= First Ricasoli government =

2nd Government of Kingdom of Italy

Ricasoli I government
- 2nd Cabinet of Italy

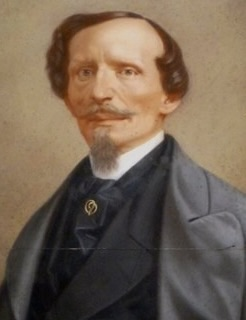
- Date formed: 12 June 1861
- Date dissolved: 3 March 1862

People and organisations
- Head of state: Victor Emmanuel II
- Head of government: Bettino Ricasoli
- Total no. of members: 9
- Member party: Historical Right

History
- Predecessor: Cavour IV Cabinet
- Successor: Rattazzi I Cabinet

The Ricasoli I government of Italy held office from 12 June 1861 until 3 March 1862, a total of 264 days, or 8 months and 19 days.

== Government parties ==
The government was composed by the following parties:

| Party | Ideology | Leader |
|---|---|---|
| Historical Right | Conservatism | Bettino Ricasoli |

== Composition ==
| Office | Name | Party | Term |
|---|---|---|---|
| Prime Minister | Bettino Ricasoli | Historical Right | (1861–1862) |
| Minister of the Interior | Marco Minghetti | Historical Right | (1861–1861) |
| Minister of the Interior | Bettino Ricasoli | Historical Right | (1861–1862) |
| Minister of Foreign Affairs | Bettino Ricasoli | Historical Right | (1861–1862) |
| Minister of Grace and Justice | Vincenzo Maria Miglietti | Historical Right | (1861–1862) |
| Minister of Finance | Pietro Bastogi | Historical Right | (1861–1862) |
| Minister of War | Bettino Ricasoli | Historical Right | (1861–1861) |
| Minister of War | Alessandro Della Rovere | Military | (1861–1862) |
| Minister of the Navy | Luigi Federico Menabrea | Historical Right | (1861–1862) |
| Minister of Agriculture, Industry and Commerce | Filippo Cordova | Historical Right | (1861–1862) |
| Minister of Public Works | Ubaldino Peruzzi | Historical Right | (1861–1862) |
| Minister of Public Education | Francesco De Sanctis | Historical Right | (1861–1862) |
