= Fourth Cavour government =

1st Government of Kingdom of Italy

Cavour IV government
- 1st Cabinet of Italy

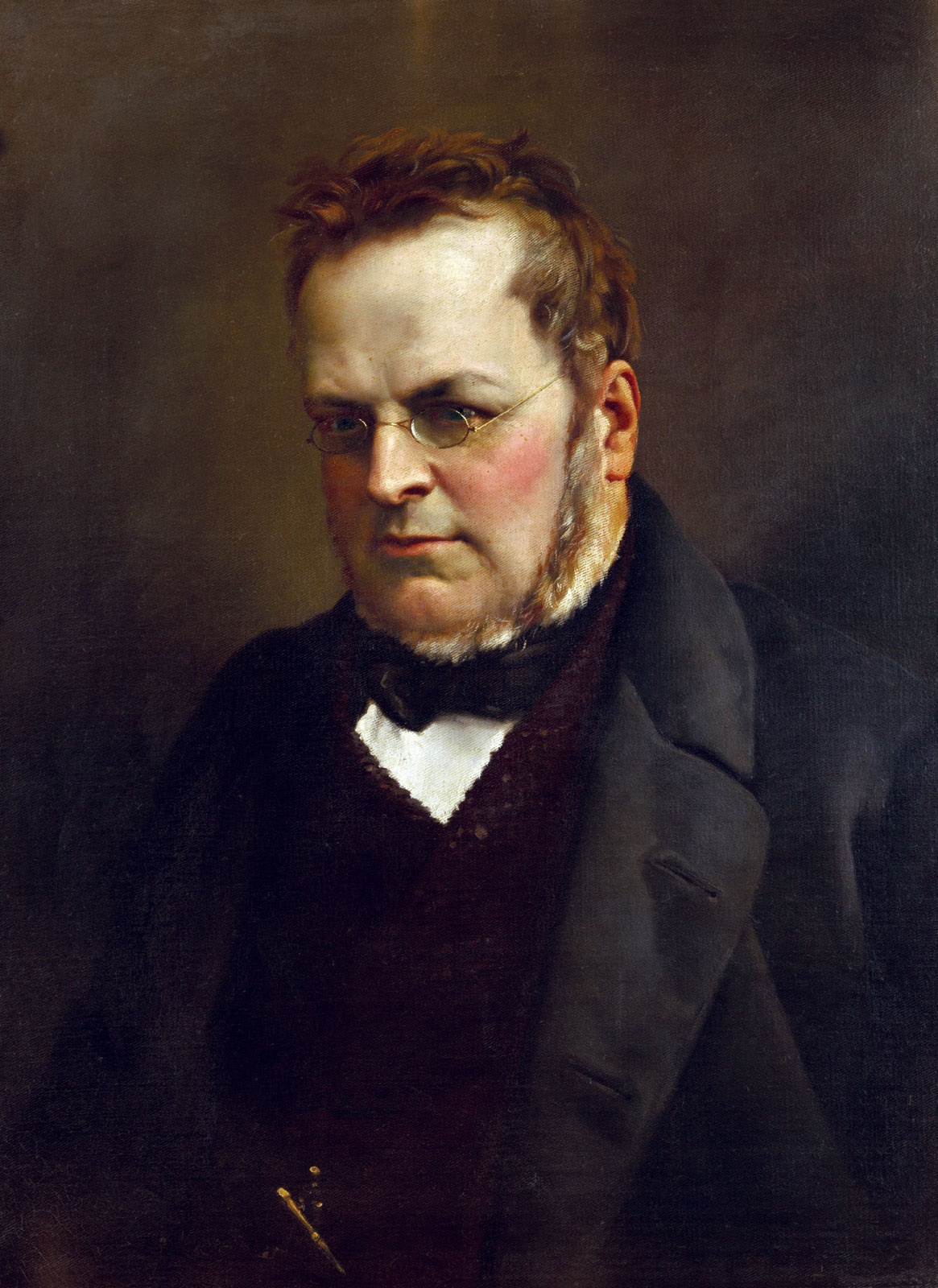
- Date formed: 23 March 1861
- Date dissolved: 12 June 1861

People and organisations
- Head of state: Victor Emmanuel II
- Head of government: Camillo Benso, Count of Cavour
- Total no. of members: 9
- Member party: Historical Right

History
- Predecessor: Third Cavour government
- Successor: First Ricasoli government

The Cavour IV government was the first cabinet of the Kingdom of Italy. It held office from 23 March until 12 June 1861, a total of 81 days, or 2 months and 20 days.

== History ==
In 1861, Victor Emmanuel II declared the Kingdom of Italy, making Cavour officially Prime Minister of Italy. Cavour had many difficult issues to consider, including how to create a national military, which legal institutions should be retained in what locations, and especially the future of Rome. Most Italians thought Rome must be the capital of a united Italy, but this conflicted with the temporal power of the Pope and also the independence of the Church. Cavour believed that Rome should remain the seat of "a free church in a free state", which would maintain its independence but give up temporal power. Still Austrian Venetia was also a problem. Cavour recognized that Venice must be an integral part of Italy but refused to take a stance on how to achieve it, saying "Will the deliverance of Venice come by arms or diplomacy? I do not know. It is the secret of Providence." A motion approving of his foreign policy passed by a huge majority, basically only opposed by left-wing and right-wing extremist groups.

Creating Italy was no easy task, but ruling it proved a worse strain on the Prime Minister. In 1861, at the peak of his career, months of long days coupled with insomnia and constant worry took their toll on Cavour. He fell ill, presumably of malaria, and to make matters worse insisted upon being bled. His regular doctor would have refused, but he was not available; so Cavour was bled several times until it was nearly impossible to draw any blood from him. He was buried in Santena, near Turin.

== Government parties ==
The government was composed by the following parties:

Party	Ideology	Leader
Historical Right	Conservatism	Camillo Benso di Cavour

== Composition ==
Office	Name	Party	Term
Prime Minister	Camillo Benso di Cavour	Historical Right	(1861–1861)
Minister of the Interior	Marco Minghetti	Historical Right	(1861–1861)
Minister of Foreign Affairs	Camillo Benso di Cavour	Historical Right	(1861–1861)
Minister of Grace and Justice	Giovanni Battista Cassinis	Historical Right	(1861–1861)
Minister of Finance	Pietro Bastogi	Historical Right	(1861–1861)
Minister of War	Manfredo Fanti	Military	(1861–1861)
Minister of the Navy	Camillo Benso di Cavour	Historical Right	(1861–1861)
Minister of Agriculture, Industry and Commerce	Giuseppe Natoli	Historical Right	(1861–1861)
Minister of Public Works	Ubaldino Peruzzi	Historical Right	(1861–1861)
Minister of Public Education	Francesco De Sanctis	Historical Right	(1861–1861)
