= Filippo Cordova =

Italian patriot, jurist and politician

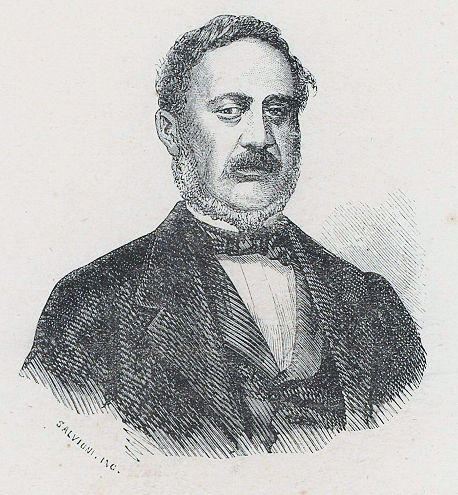

Minister of Justice
- In office 3 March 1862 – 7 April 1862
- Prime Minister: Urbano Rattazzi
- Preceded by: Vincenzo Maria Miglietti
- Succeeded by: Raffaele Conforti
- In office 24 March 1867 – 10 April 1867
- Prime Minister: Bettino Ricasoli
- Preceded by: Bettino Ricasoli
- Succeeded by: Sebastiano Tecchio

Minister of Agriculture
- In office 12 June 1861 – 3 March 1862
- Prime Minister: Bettino Ricasoli
- Preceded by: Giuseppe Natoli
- Succeeded by: Gioacchino Napoleone Pepoli
- In office 20 June 1866 – 10 April 1867
- Prime Minister: Bettino Ricasoli
- Preceded by: Domenico Berti
- Succeeded by: Francesco De Blasiis

Member of Parliament
- In office 18 February 1861 – 16 September 1868

Filippo Cordova (Aidone, 1 May 1811 – Florence, 16 September 1868) was an Italian patriot, jurist and politician.

== Background and early career ==
He was born into a family whose ancestry included the Baron of Villa Orlando Boscarini, and he descended from the Spanish general and statesman Gonzalo Fernández de Córdoba. He showed a certain precociousness from childhood; at the age of ten he composed three tragedies (Cato, Giovanni and I Dittinali) and a sonnet in honor of Saint Lawrence, patron saint of his hometown.

He graduated in Catania with a degree in law and geology and in 1831 entered the office of the lawyer Antonio Agnetta in Palermo, where he met several patriots, including Michele Amari, Vincenzo Fardella di Torrearsa and Ruggero Settimo.

Helped by his uncle-cousin Gaetano Scovazzo-Cordova in 1838 he participated in the "Scientific Congress of Clermont-Ferrand " and made himself known in the Académie Française.

Appointed councilor of stewardship in Caltanissetta, in 1839 he made a study of feudal tithes in Sicily and in 1841 he participated in the "Scientific Congress" in Naples. Through the Prince of Canino he became a freemason and in 1860 in Turin, through his friendship with in relation to his friendship with Camillo Benso, Count of Cavour he became one of the leaders of the Ausonia lodge, which had the objective of the Unification of Italy with Rome as its capital: he then became a leader of the Grand Orient of Italy, assuming the position of grand master on 1 March 1862. The following year he took part in the Masonic Constituent Assembly of Florence.

== Cordova's role in the events of 1848 ==
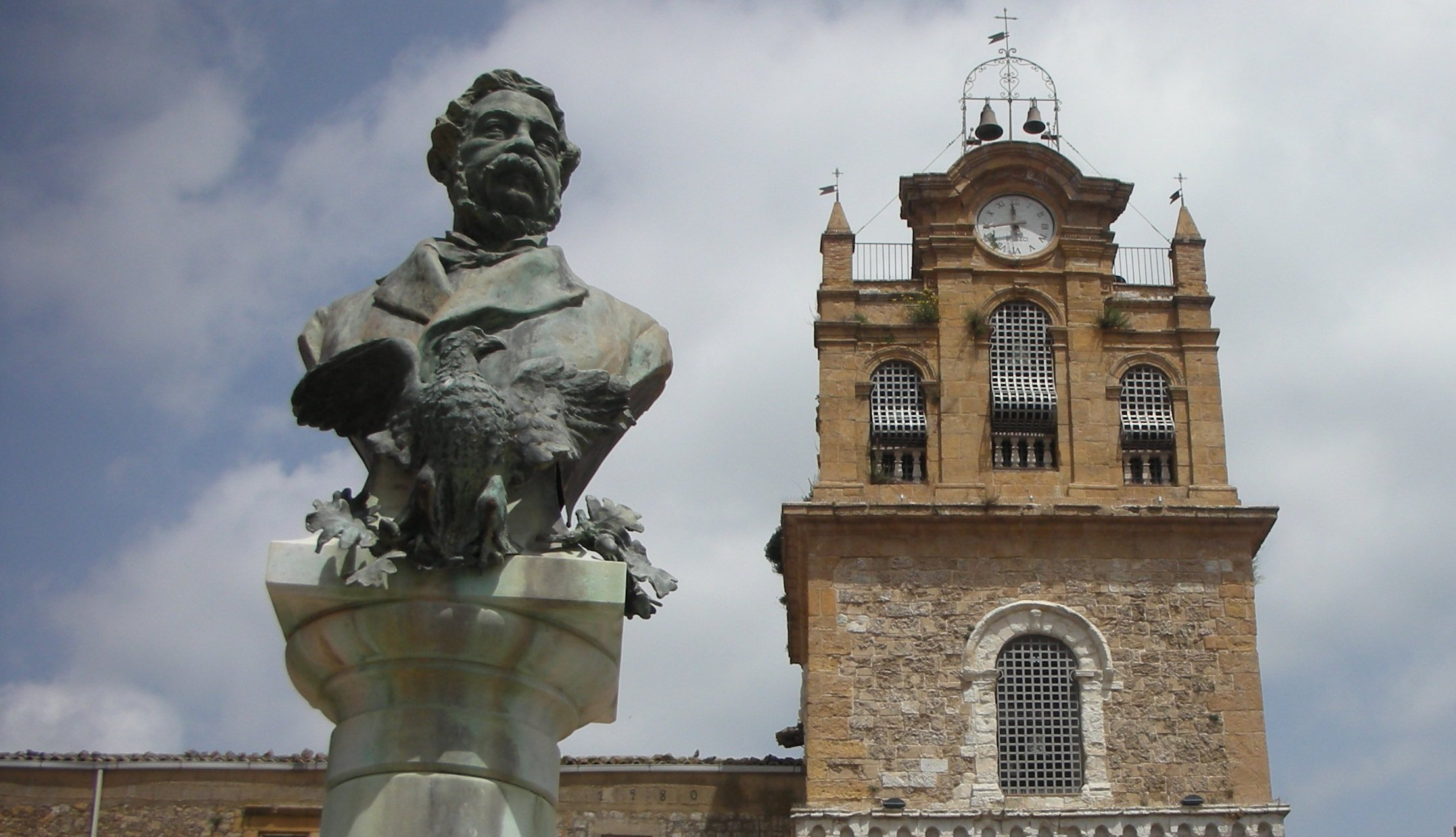
Bust of Filippo Cordova in Aidone

In January 1848, when Sicily rebelled against the Bourbons, he was secretary of the provincial revolutionary committee and was elected deputy to the "House of Commons" in March. He took care of the drafting of the Sicilian statute. On 13 August the Sicilian head of state, Ruggero Settimo, appointed him finance minister in the government led by the Marquis Torrearsa.

Filippo Cordova devised a "mixed committee" that would take the most important decisions for the new Sicilian state. As minister he proposed the introduction of paper money with the creation of the Banco di Sicilia. By decree he established that ecclesiastical goods and church silverware were to be pledged for loans to the state; he also abolished the hated tax on ground coffee which particularly burdened the poorest sections of the population. The radical nature of his proposals, which aimed to transform Sicily’s great landed estates with the creation of many small landowners, was opposed by the nobles in the Sicilian parliament and by the clergy.

He drafted the document which sanctioned the deposition of Ferdinand II of the Two Sicilies and supported the offer of the crown to Ferdinand of Savoy-Genoa.

To raise funds for the war against the Bourbons he proposed a forced mortgage, based on agreements made with a French bank by Michele Amari, stirring clear opposition from the nobles. He was forced to resign.

== Exile in Piedmont ==
In May 1849 the army of King Ferdinand led by Satriano reconquered Sicily. Filippo Cordova, one of the 43 proscribed Sicilian patriots, was forced into exile first in Marseille and then in Turin.

In Turin Cordova, who had already gained journalistic experience in Sicily with his liberal newspaper La Luce, became part of the editorial team of the newspaper Il Risorgimento directed by Cavour. He became its director in 1852; the following year the newspaper took the name of The Parlamento.

He also taught law at the Commercial Institute of Statistics and Political Economy at the National College of Turin.

In 1857 Cavour called him to direct the statistics office of the Ministry of Finance and he oversaw the drafting of the laws on the "Council of State", on the "Court of Auditors" and on "administrative litigation". In 1859 he published a report on the general census of the Kingdom.

== The role of Cordova in the early years of the Unification of Italy ==
Filippo Cordova provided the maps of Sicily for Giuseppe Garibaldi's Expedition of the Thousand, in which his nephew it:Vincenzo Cordova Savini also participated. In July 1860 he was able to return to Palermo.

Garibaldi initially appointed him attorney general of the Court of Auditors, but he was later expelled from Sicily following the political struggle that broke out between Giuseppe La Farina, Cavour's envoy, and Francesco Crispi, Garibaldi's secretary.

After staying in Naples, Cordova returned to Piedmont and Cavour appointed him secretary of the Ministry of Finance in the first government of the Kingdom, with the task of unifying the budgets of the pre-unification states. He fought for the annexation of Sicily to the Kingdom of Italy and in the new parliament he was elected deputy in the constituencies of Caltanissetta, Caltagirone and Syracuse.

After Cavour's death he was appointed to the Ministry of Agriculture and Commerce in the first Ricasoli government (1861-1862), where he established the "Statistics Division” (currently ISTAT) and oversaw the establishment of an expert panel to work in the production of Italy’s first geological survey. He was then Minister of Justice in the first Rattazzi government (1862), state councillor and again Minister of Agriculture in the second Ricasoli government (1866-1867).

In 1868 he was elected president of the "Commission of inquiry into fiat currency", but he suffered a heart attack on 2 June while on his way to vote for the repeal of the law. He resigned for health reasons and died on 16 September in Florence, where he was buried in the San Miniato al Monte cemetery.

In the years 1889-93, his nephew, Senator Vincenzo Cordova Savina, published his memoirs, including speeches to the Italian Parliament.
