= Minister of Justice (Italy) =

Ministry in the Cabinet of Italy

- Ministro della Giustizia

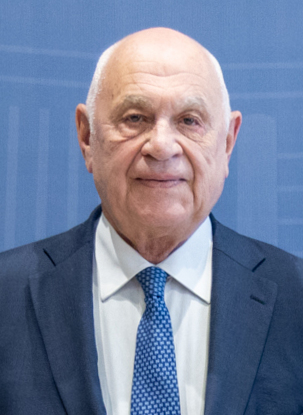
- Incumbent; Carlo Nordio since October 22, 2022
- Ministry of Justice
- Member of: Council of Ministers
- Seat: Rome
- Appointer: The president of Italy
- Term length: No fixed term
- Formation: March 23, 1861; 165 years ago
- First holder: Giovanni Battista Cassinis
- Website: www.giustizia.it

This is a list of the Italian ministers of justice since 1946. The minister of justice is a senior member of the Italian Cabinet and leads the Ministry of Justice.

The first Italian minister of justice is Giovanni Battista Cassinis, member of the Historical Right, who held the office in 1861 in the government of Camillo Benso, Count of Cavour; while the longest-serving minister was Alfredo Rocco, who served in the fascist government of Benito Mussolini from 1925 until 1932. The current minister is Carlo Nordio, appointed on 22 October 2022 in the government of Giorgia Meloni.

== List of ministers of justice ==
=== Kingdom of Italy ===
==== Parties ====
- 1861–1912:
  - Historical Right
  - Historical Left
  - Italian Radical Party
- 1912–1922:
  - Liberal Party
  - Italian Radical Party
  - Democratic Liberal Party
  - Italian Social Democratic Party
  - Italian People's Party
  - Independent
- 1922–1943:
  - National Fascist Party
- 1943–1946:
  - Italian Liberal Party
  - Christian Democracy
  - Italian Communist Party
  - Independent

==== Coalitions ====
- 1861–1912:
  - Rightist coalition
  - Leftist coalition
  - Mixed coalition
- 1912–1922:
  - Liberal coalition
- 1922–1943:
  - Fascist
- 1943–1946:
  - Mixed coalition

==== Ministers ====
Portrait	Name (Born–Died)	Term of office			Party	Government	Ref.
Portrait	Name (Born–Died)	Took office	Left office	Time in office	Party	Government	Ref.
Minister of Grace, Justice and Ecclesiastic Affairs
	Giovanni Battista Cassinis (1806–1866)	23 March 1861	12 June 1861	81 days	Historical Right	Cavour IV	
	Vincenzo Maria Miglietti (1809–1864)	12 June 1861	3 March 1862	263 days	Historical Right	Ricasoli I	
Minister of Grace, Justice and Worships
	Filippo Cordova (1811–1868)	3 March 1862	7 April 1862	35 days	Historical Right	Rattazzi I	
	Raffaele Conforti (1804–1880)	7 April 1862	8 December 1862	245 days	Historical Left	Rattazzi I	
	Giuseppe Pisanelli (1812–1879)	8 December 1862	28 September 1864	1 year, 295 days	Historical Left	Farini; Minghetti I	
	Giuseppe Vacca (1810–1876)	28 September 1864	10 August 1865	316 days	Historical Right	La Marmora II	
	Paolo Cortese (1827–1876)	10 August 1865	31 December 1865	143 days	Historical Right	La Marmora II	
	Giovanni De Falco (1818–1886)	31 December 1865	20 June 1866	171 days	Historical Right	La Marmora III	
	Francesco Borgatti (1818–1885)	20 June 1886	17 February 1867	242 days	Historical Right	Ricasoli II	
	Bettino Ricasoli (1809–1880) As Prime Minister	17 February 1867	24 March 1867	35 days	Historical Right	Ricasoli II	
	Filippo Cordova (1811–1868)	24 March 1867	10 April 1867	17 days	Historical Right	Ricasoli II	
	Sebastiano Tecchio (1807–1886)	10 April 1867	27 October 1867	200 days	Historical Left	Rattazzi II	
	Adriano Mari (1813–1887)	27 October 1867	5 January 1868	70 days	Historical Right	Menabrea I	
	Gennaro De Filippo (1816–1887)	5 January 1868	25 May 1869	1 year, 140 days	Historical Right	Menabrea II·III	
	Michele Pironti (1814–1885)	25 May 1869	22 October 1869	150 days	Historical Right	Menabrea II·III	
	Paolo Onorato Vigliani (1813–1900)	22 October 1869	14 December 1869	53 days	Historical Right	Menabrea III	
	Matteo Raeli (1812–1875)	14 December 1869	24 February 1871	1 year, 72 days	Historical Right	Lanza	
	Giovanni De Falco (1818–1886)	24 February 1871	10 July 1873	2 years, 136 days	Historical Right	Lanza	
	Paolo Onorato Vigliani (1813–1900)	10 July 1873	25 March 1876	2 years, 259 days	Historical Right	Minghetti II	
	Pasquale Stanislao Mancini (1817–1888)	25 March 1876	24 March 1878	1 year, 364 days	Historical Left	Depretis I·II	
	Raffaele Conforti (1804–1880)	24 March 1878	19 December 1878	270 days	Historical Left	Cairoli I	
	Diego Tajani (1827–1921)	19 December 1878	14 July 1879	207 days	Historical Left	Depretis III	
	Giovanni Battista Varè (1832–1915)	14 July 1879	25 November 1879	134 days	Historical Left	Cairoli II	
	Tommaso Villa (1832–1915)	25 November 1879	29 May 1881	1 year, 185 days	Historical Left	Cairoli III	
	Giuseppe Zanardelli (1832–1915)	29 May 1881	25 May 1883	1 year, 361 days	Historical Left	Depretis IV	
	Bernardino Giannuzzi-Savelli (1822–1887)	25 May 1883	30 May 1884	1 year, 5 days	Historical Left	Depretis V	
	Niccolò Ferracciu (1815–1892)	30 May 1884	24 November 1884	178 days	Historical Left	Depretis VI	
	Enrico Pessina (1828–1916)	24 November 1884	29 June 1885	217 days	Historical Left	Depretis VI	
	Diego Tajani (1827–1921)	29 June 1885	4 April 1887	1 year, 279 days	Historical Left	Depretis VII	
	Giuseppe Zanardelli (1832–1915)	4 April 1887	6 February 1891	3 years, 308 days	Historical Left	Depretis VIII; Crispi I·II	
	Luigi Ferraris (1813–1900)	6 February 1891	31 December 1891	328 days	Historical Right	Di Rudinì I	
	Bruno Chimirri (1842–1917)	31 December 1891	15 May 1892	136 days	Historical Right	Di Rudinì I	
	Teodorico Bonacci (1838–1905)	15 May 1892	24 May 1893	1 year, 6 days	Historical Left	Giolitti I	
	Lorenzo Eula (1823–1893)	24 May 1893	8 July 1893	45 days	Historical Left	Giolitti I	
	Francesco Santamaria-Nicolini (1830–1918)	8 July 1893	27 September 1893	79 days	Historical Left	Giolitti I	
	Giacomo Armò (1830–1909)	27 September 1893	15 December 1893	81 days	Historical Left	Giolitti I	
	Vincenzo Calenda di Tavani (1830–1910)	15 December 1893	10 March 1896	2 years, 86 days	Historical Left	Crispi III·IV	
	Giacomo Giuseppe Costa (1833–1897)	10 March 1896	15 August 1897	1 year, 158 days	Historical Right	Di Rudinì II·III	
	Antonio Starabba di Rudinì (1839–1908) As Prime Minister	15 August 1897	18 September 1897	34 days	Historical Right	Di Rudinì III	
	Emanuele Gianturco (1857–1907)	18 September 1897	14 December 1897	87 days	Historical Right	Di Rudinì III	
	Giuseppe Zanardelli (1832–1915)	14 December 1897	1 June 1898	169 days	Historical Left	Di Rudinì IV	
	Teodorico Bonacci (1838–1905)	1 June 1898	29 June 1898	28 days	Historical Left	Rudinì V	
	Camillo Finocchiaro Aprile (1851–1916)	29 June 1898	14 May 1899	319 days	Historical Left	Pelloux I	
	Adeodato Bonasi (1831–1920)	14 May 1899	24 June 1900	1 year, 41 days	Historical Right	Pelloux II	
	Emanuele Gianturco (1857–1907)	24 June 1900	15 February 1901	236 days	Historical Right	Saracco	
	Francesco Cocco-Ortu (1842–1929)	15 February 1901	3 November 1903	2 years, 261 days	Historical Left	Zanardelli	
	Scipione Ronchetti (1846–1918)	3 November 1903	28 March 1905	1 year, 145 days	Historical Left	Giolitti II; Tittoni	
	Camillo Finocchiaro Aprile (1851–1916)	28 March 1905	8 February 1906	317 days	Historical Left	Fortis I·II	
	Ettore Sacchi (1851–1924)	8 February 1906	29 May 1906	110 days	Italian Radical Party	Sonnino I	
	Nicolò Gallo (1849–1907)	29 May 1906	4 March 1907	279 days	Historical Left	Giolitti III	
	Vittorio Emanuele Orlando (1860–1952)	4 March 1907	11 December 1909	2 years, 282 days	Historical Left	Giolitti III	
	Vittorio Scialoja (1856–1933)	11 December 1909	31 March 1910	110 days	Historical Right	Sonnino II	
	Cesare Fani (1844–1914)	31 March 1910	30 March 1911	364 days	Historical Right	Luzzatti	
	Camillo Finocchiaro Aprile (1851–1916)	30 March 1911	21 March 1914	2 years, 356 days	Liberal Party	Giolitti IV	
	Luigi Dari (1852–1919)	21 March 1914	31 October 1914	224 days	Liberal Party	Salandra I	
	Vittorio Emanuele Orlando (1860–1952)	31 October 1914	18 June 1916	1 year, 231 days	Liberal Party	Salandra II	
	Ettore Sacchi (1851–1924)	18 June 1916	18 January 1919	2 years, 231 days	Italian Radical Party	Boselli; Orlando	
	Luigi Facta (1861–1930)	18 January 1919	23 June 1919	156 days	Liberal Party	Orlando	
	Lodovico Mortara (1855–1937)	23 June 1919	21 May 1920	333 days	Independent	Nitti I	
Minister of Justice and Worship Affairs
	Alfredo Falcioni (1868–1936)	21 May 1920	19 June 1920	29 days	Democratic Liberal Party	Nitti II	
	Luigi Fera (1868–1935)	19 June 1920	4 July 1921	1 year, 15 days	Italian Social Democratic Party	Giolitti V	
	Giulio Rodinò (1875–1946)	4 July 1921	26 February 1922	237 days	Italian People's Party	Bonomi I	
	Luigi Rossi (1867–1941)	26 February 1922	1 August 1922	156 days	Democratic Liberal Party	Facta I	
	Giulio Alessio (1853–1940)	1 August 1922	31 October 1922	91 days	Democratic Liberal Party	Facta II	
	Aldo Oviglio (1873–1942)	31 October 1922	5 January 1925	2 years, 66 days	National Fascist Party	Mussolini	
	Alfredo Rocco (1875–1935)	5 January 1925	20 July 1932	7 years, 197 days	National Fascist Party	Mussolini	
Minister of Grace and Justice
	Pietro De Francisci (1883–1971)	20 July 1932	24 January 1935	2 years, 188 days	National Fascist Party	Mussolini	
	Arrigo Solmi (1873–1944)	24 January 1935	12 July 1939	4 years, 169 days	National Fascist Party	Mussolini	
	Dino Grandi (1895–1988)	12 July 1939	5 February 1943	3 years, 208 days	National Fascist Party	Mussolini	
	Alfredo De Marsico (1888–1985)	5 February 1943	25 July 1943	170 days	National Fascist Party	Mussolini	
	Gaetano Azzariti (1881–1961)	25 July 1943	15 February 1944	205 days	Independent	Badoglio I	
	Ettore Casati (1873–1945)	15 February 1944	24 April 1944	69 days	Independent	Badoglio I	
	Vincenzo Arangio-Ruiz (1884–1964)	24 April 1944	18 June 1944	55 days	Italian Liberal Party	Badoglio II	
	Umberto Tupini (1889–1973)	18 June 1944	21 June 1945	1 year, 3 days	Christian Democracy	Bonomi II·III	
	Palmiro Togliatti (1893–1964)	21 June 1945	13 July 1946	1 year, 22 days	Italian Communist Party	Parri; De Gasperi I	

=== Italian Republic ===
==== Parties ====
- 1946–1994:
  - Italian Communist Party
  - Italian Liberal Party
  - Christian Democracy
  - Italian Republican Party
  - Italian Socialist Party
- 1994–present:
  - Forza Italia / The People of Freedom
  - Party of Italian Communists
  - Democrats of the Left
  - Northern League
  - Union of Democrats for Europe
  - Democratic Party
  - Five Star Movement
  - Brothers of Italy
  - Independent

==== Coalitions ====
- 1946–1994:
  - Centrist coalition
  - Organic Centre-left
  - Pentapartito / Quadripartito
  - Mixed coalition
- 1994–present:
  - Centre-right coalition
  - Centre-left coalition
  - Mixed coalition

==== Ministers ====
Portrait	Name (Born–Died)	Term of office			Party	Government	Ref.
Portrait	Name (Born–Died)	Took office	Left office	Time in office	Party	Government	Ref.
Minister of Grace and Justice
	Fausto Gullo (1887–1974)	13 July 1946	31 May 1947	323 days	Italian Communist Party	De Gasperi II·III	
	Giuseppe Grassi (1883–1950)	31 May 1947	27 January 1950	2 years, 241 days	Italian Liberal Party	De Gasperi IV·V	
	Attilio Piccioni (1892–1976)	27 January 1950	26 July 1951	1 year, 180 days	Christian Democracy	De Gasperi VI	
	Adone Zoli (1887–1960)	26 July 1951	16 July 1953	1 year, 355 days	Christian Democracy	De Gasperi VII	
	Guido Gonella (1905–1982)	16 July 1953	17 August 1953	32 days	Christian Democracy	De Gasperi VIII	
	Antonio Azara (1883–1967)	17 August 1953	18 January 1954	154 days	Christian Democracy	Pella	
	Michele De Pietro (1884–1967)	18 January 1954	6 July 1955	1 year, 169 days	Christian Democracy	Fanfani I Scelba	
	Aldo Moro (1916–1978)	6 July 1955	19 May 1957	1 year, 317 days	Christian Democracy	Segni I	
	Guido Gonella (1905–1982)	19 May 1957	21 February 1962	4 years, 278 days	Christian Democracy	Zoli; Fanfani II; Segni II; Tambroni; Fanfani III	
	Giacinto Bosco (1905–1997)	21 February 1962	4 December 1963	1 year, 286 days	Christian Democracy	Fanfani IV; Leone I	
	Oronzo Reale (1902–1988)	4 December 1963	24 June 1968	4 years, 203 days	Italian Republican Party	Moro I·II·III	
	Guido Gonella (1905–1982)	24 June 1968	12 December 1968	171 days	Christian Democracy	Leone II	
	Silvio Gava (1901–1999)	12 December 1968	27 March 1970	1 year, 105 days	Christian Democracy	Leone II	
	Silvio Gava (1901–1999)	12 December 1968	27 March 1970	1 year, 105 days	Christian Democracy	Rumor I	
	Silvio Gava (1901–1999)	12 December 1968	27 March 1970	1 year, 105 days	Christian Democracy	Rumor II	
	Oronzo Reale (1902–1988)	27 March 1970	1 March 1971	339 days	Italian Republican Party	Rumor III; Colombo	
	Emilio Colombo (1920–2013) As Prime Minister	1 March 1971	17 February 1972	353 days	Christian Democracy	Colombo	
	Guido Gonella (1905–1982)	17 February 1972	7 July 1973	1 year, 140 days	Christian Democracy	Andreotti I·II	
	Mario Zagari (1913–1996)	7 July 1973	23 November 1974	1 year, 139 days	Italian Socialist Party	Rumor IV·V	
	Oronzo Reale (1902–1988)	23 November 1974	12 February 1976	1 year, 81 days	Italian Republican Party	Moro IV	
	Francesco Paolo Bonifacio (1923–1989)	12 February 1976	20 March 1979	3 years, 36 days	Christian Democracy	Moro V Andreotti III·IV	
	Tommaso Morlino (1925–1983)	20 March 1979	18 October 1980	1 year, 212 days	Christian Democracy	Andreotti V Cossiga I	
	Tommaso Morlino (1925–1983)	20 March 1979	18 October 1980	1 year, 212 days	Christian Democracy	Cossiga II	
	Adolfo Sarti (1928–1992)	18 October 1980	23 May 1981	217 days	Christian Democracy	Forlani	
	Clelio Darida (1927–2017)	23 May 1981	4 August 1983	2 years, 73 days	Christian Democracy	Forlani	
	Clelio Darida (1927–2017)	23 May 1981	4 August 1983	2 years, 73 days	Christian Democracy	Spadolini I·II; Fanfani V	
	Mino Martinazzoli (1931–2011)	4 August 1983	1 August 1986	2 years, 362 days	Christian Democracy	Craxi I	
	Virginio Rognoni (1924–2022)	1 August 1986	29 July 1987	362 days	Christian Democracy	Craxi II	
	Virginio Rognoni (1924–2022)	1 August 1986	29 July 1987	362 days	Christian Democracy	Fanfani VI	
	Giuliano Vassalli (1915–2009)	29 July 1987	2 February 1991	3 years, 188 days	Italian Socialist Party	Goria; De Mita; Andreotti VI	
	Claudio Martelli (1943– )	2 February 1991	28 April 1993	2 years, 85 days	Italian Socialist Party	Andreotti VI·VII; Amato I	
	Giovanni Conso (1922–2015)	28 April 1993	10 May 1994	1 year, 12 days	Independent	Amato I	
	Giovanni Conso (1922–2015)	28 April 1993	10 May 1994	1 year, 12 days	Independent	Ciampi	
	Alfredo Biondi (1928–2020)	10 May 1994	17 January 1995	252 days	Forza Italia	Berlusconi I	
	Filippo Mancuso (1922–2011)	17 January 1995	19 October 1995	275 days	Independent	Dini	
	Lamberto Dini (1931– ) As Prime Minister	19 October 1995	16 February 1996	120 days	Independent	Dini	
	Vincenzo Caianiello (1932–2002)	16 February 1996	17 May 1996	91 days	Independent	Dini	
	Giovanni Maria Flick (1940– )	17 May 1996	21 October 1998	2 years, 157 days	Independent	Prodi I	
	Oliviero Diliberto (1956– )	21 October 1998	25 April 2000	1 year, 187 days	Party of Italian Communists	D'Alema I·II	
Minister of Justice
	Piero Fassino (1949– )	25 April 2000	11 June 2001	1 year, 47 days	Democrats of the Left	Amato II	
	Roberto Castelli (1946– )	11 June 2001	17 May 2006	4 years, 340 days	Northern League	Berlusconi II·III	
	Clemente Mastella (1947– )	17 May 2006	17 January 2008	1 year, 245 days	Union of Democrats for Europe	Prodi II	
	Romano Prodi (1939– ) As Prime Minister	17 January 2008	6 February 2008	20 days	Democratic Party	Prodi II	
	Luigi Scotti (1932– )	6 February 2008	8 May 2008	92 days	Independent	Prodi II	
	Angelino Alfano (1970– )	8 May 2008	28 July 2011	3 years, 81 days	The People of Freedom	Berlusconi IV	
	Nitto Francesco Palma (1950– )	28 July 2011	16 November 2011	111 days	The People of Freedom	Berlusconi IV	
	Paola Severino (1948– )	16 November 2011	28 April 2013	1 year, 163 days	Independent	Monti	
	Annamaria Cancellieri (1943– )	28 April 2013	22 February 2014	300 days	Independent	Letta	
	Andrea Orlando (1969– )	22 February 2014	1 June 2018	4 years, 99 days	Democratic Party	Renzi; Gentiloni	
	Alfonso Bonafede (1976– )	1 June 2018	13 February 2021	2 years, 257 days	Five Star Movement	Conte I·II	
	Marta Cartabia (1963– )	13 February 2021	22 October 2022	1 year, 251 days	Independent	Draghi	
	Carlo Nordio (1947– )	22 October 2022	Incumbent	3 years, 321 days	Brothers of Italy	Meloni	

== See also ==
- Keeper of the seals
