= Third Cavour government =

13th government of the Kingdom of Sardinia

Cavour III government
- 13th Cabinet of the Kingdom of Sardinia

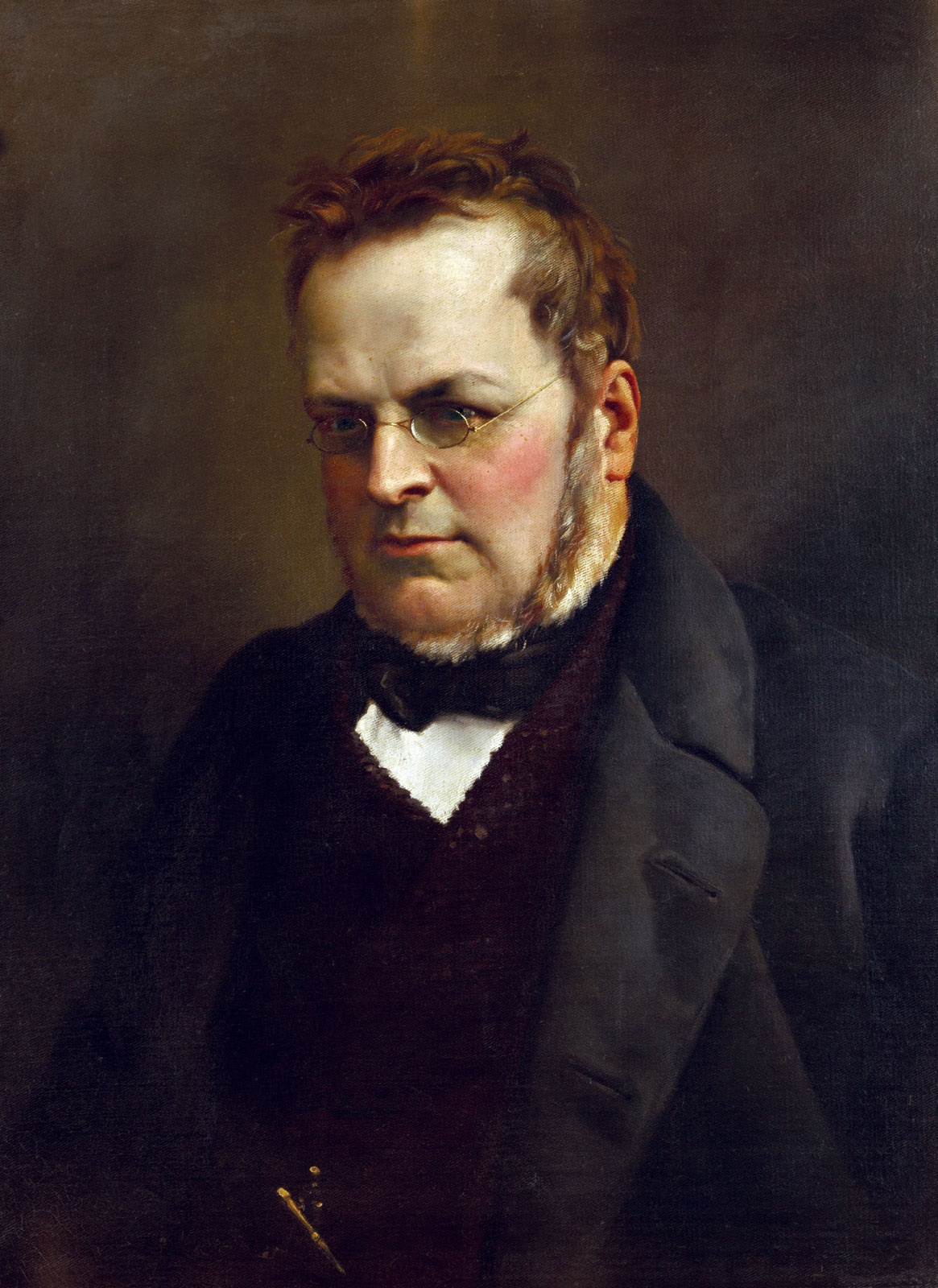
- Date formed: 21 January 1860
- Date dissolved: 23 March 1861

People and organisations
- Head of state: Victor Emmanuel II
- Head of government: Camillo Benso, Count of Cavour
- Member party: Historical Right

History
- Predecessor: First La Marmora government
- Successor: Fourth Cavour government

The third Cavour government was the 13th and last cabinet of the Kingdom of Sardinia led by Camillo Benso di Cavour as prime minister, who additionally held the portfolios of foreign affairs and the navy. It held office from 21 January 1860 until 23 March 1861.

== Composition ==
Office	Name	Party	Term
Prime Minister	Camillo Benso di Cavour	Historical Right	21 January 1860 – 23 March 1861
Minister of Foreign Affairs	Camillo Benso di Cavour	Historical Right	21 January 1860 – 23 March 1861
Minister of the Interior	Camillo Benso di Cavour	Historical Right	21 January 1860 – 24 March 1860
Minister of the Interior	Luigi Carlo Farini	Historical Right	24 March 1860 – 31 December 1860
Minister of the Interior	Marco Minghetti	Historical Right	31 December 1860 – 23 March 1861
Minister of Grace, Justice and Ecclesiastical Affairs	Giovanni Battista Cassinis	Historical Right	21 January 1860 – 23 March 1861
Minister of War	Manfredo Fanti	Military	21 January 1860 – 23 March 1861
Minister of Finance	Francesco Saverio Vegezzi	Historical Right	21 January 1860 – 23 March 1861
Minister of Public Works	Stefano Jacini	Historical Right	21 January 1860 – 14 February 1861
Minister of Public Works	Ubaldino Peruzzi	Historical Right	14 February 1861 – 23 March 1861
Minister of Public Education	Terenzio Mamiani	Historical Right	21 January 1860 – 23 March 1861
Minister of the Navy	Camillo Benso di Cavour	Historical Right	21 January 1860 – 23 March 1861
Minister of Agriculture, Industry and Commerce	Tommaso Corsi	Centre-right	5 July 1860 – 23 March 1861
