= Adriano Mari =

Italian politician

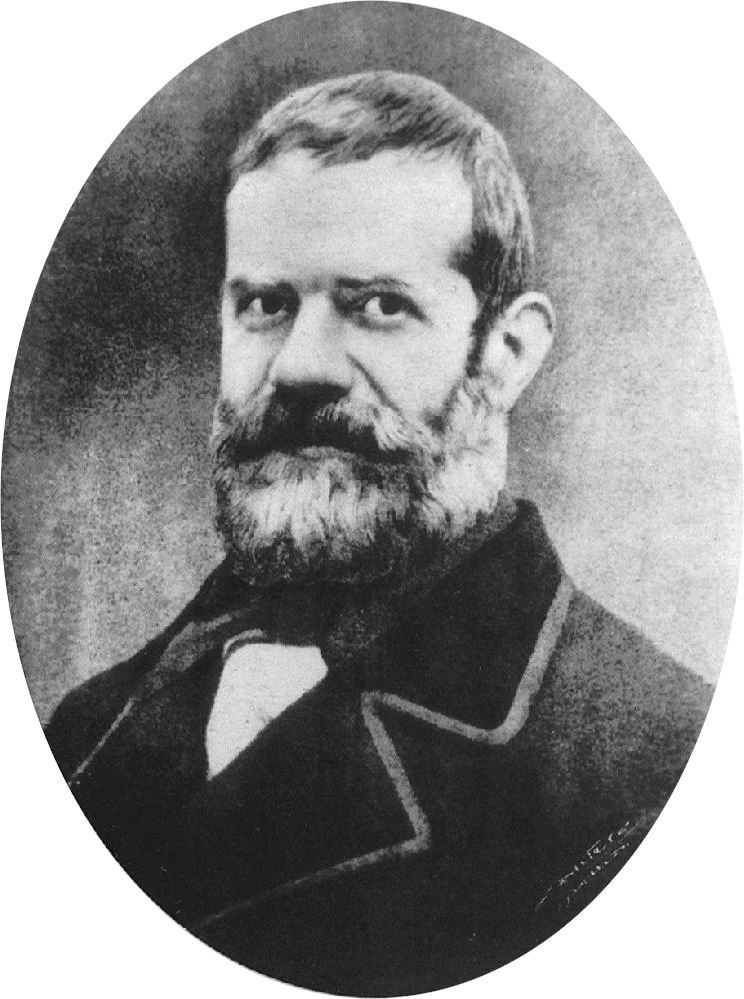

President of the Chamber of Deputies
- In office 18 November 1865 – 27 October 1867
- Preceded by: Giovanni Battista Cassinis
- Succeeded by: Giovanni Lanza

Minister of Justice
- In office 27 October 1867 – 5 January 1868
- Preceded by: Sebastiano Tecchio
- Succeeded by: Gennaro De Filippo

Senator
- In office 26 November 1884 – 24 July 1887

Member of the Chamber of Deputies
- In office 18 February 1861 – 2 October 1882

Deputy in the Parliament of Sardinia
- In office 2 April 1860 – 17 December 1860

Adriano Mari (Florence, 16 December 1813 – Fiesole, 24 July 1887) was an Italian politician. He served as Minister of Justice from 1867-68.

== Early life and career ==
Born in San Salvi but from the Livorno branch of the Mari family, he studied law at the University of Pisa and dedicated himself to the profession of lawyer. He began his political activity in 1848 when, after the expulsion of Grand Duke Leopold II and the establishment of a republican government, he was elected deputy to the Tuscan Assembly where he sided with the moderates. He abandoned his parliamentary seat almost immediately due to the prevalence of the extreme democratic faction in the assembly and returned to his legal practice. However, as a liberal, once the Tuscan Republic fell, he took on the defense of important political defendants during the period of the grand ducal restoration.

== The Kingdom of Italy ==
In 1859 he actively worked for the end of the Grand Duchy and for the annexation to the Kingdom of Sardinia and was subsequently elected deputy to parliament where he remained for eight legislatures representing various Tuscan constituencies. Although he sat on the right benches, he also enjoyed the esteem of other political parties, so much so that he was appointed member of numerous commissions and rapporteur of various bills.

After the transfer of the Italian capital to Florence, his hometown, he was elected President of the Chamber on 18 November 1865, on the third ballot, in a run-off with Antonio Mordini, and was then reconfirmed for the first time on 18 December 1866 and again on 27 March 1867 beating Francesco Crispi.

From October 1867 to January 1868 he was Minister of Justice in the first Menabrea government and it was he who signed the order for Garibaldi's arrest after his invasion of the Papal States. In this turbulent period, marked by the Roman question, he failed to implement the reforms he desired.

He continued his political activity after the Left came to power, both as a deputy in the Chamber and in the municipal and regional context in Florence.

Appointed Senator on 26 November 1884, he only worked occasionally due to his advanced age and his precarious state of health.

== Honours ==
Commendatore dell'Ordine dei Santi Maurizio e Lazzaro - ribbon for ordinary uniform

Commander of the Order of Saints Maurice and Lazarus

Commendatore dell'Ordine della Corona d'Italia - ribbon for ordinary uniform

Knight of the Order of the Crown of Italy
