= Second Rattazzi government =

9th Government of Kingdom of Italy

Rattazzi II government
- 9th Cabinet of Italy

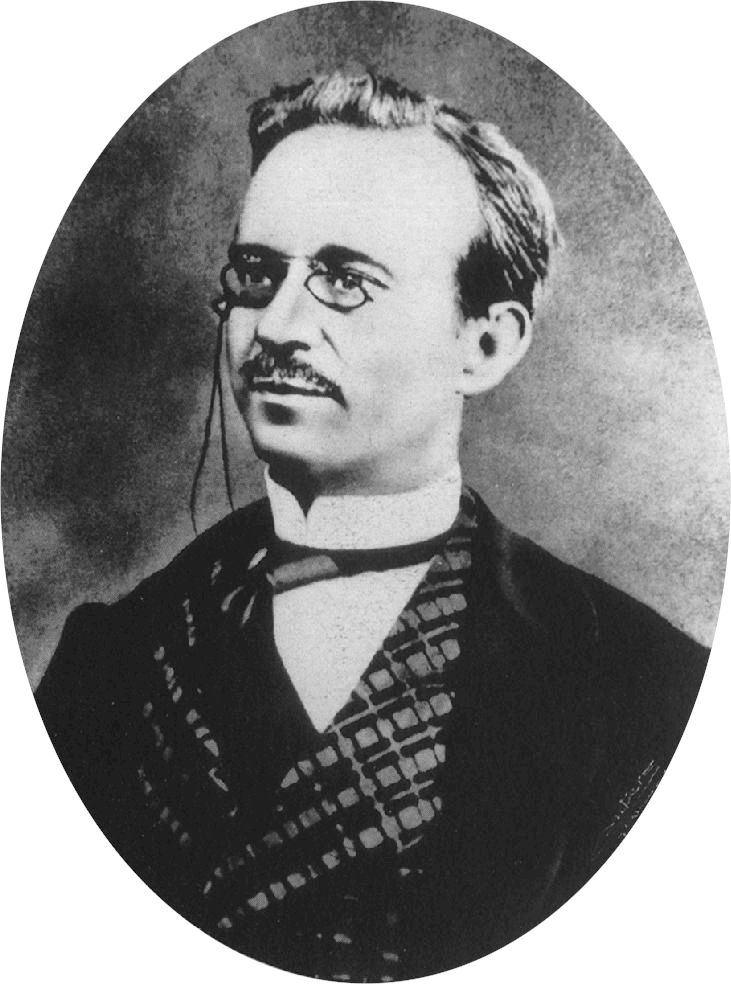
- Date formed: 10 April 1867
- Date dissolved: 27 October 1867

People and organisations
- Head of state: Victor Emmanuel II
- Head of government: Urbano Rattazzi
- Total no. of members: 9
- Member party: Historical Left

History
- Predecessor: Ricasoli II Cabinet
- Successor: Menabrea I Cabinet

The Rattazzi II government of Italy held office from 10 April 1867 until 27 October 1867, a total of 200 days, or 6 months and 17 days.

== Government parties ==
The government was composed by the following parties:

Party	Ideology	Leader
Historical Left	Liberalism	Urbano Rattazzi

== Composition ==
Office	Name	Party	Term
Prime Minister	Urbano Rattazzi	Historical Left	(1867–1867)
Minister of the Interior	Urbano Rattazzi	Historical Left	(1867–1867)
Minister of Foreign Affairs	Federico Pescetto	Military	(1867–1867)
Minister of Foreign Affairs	Pompeo Di Campello	Historical Left	(1867–1867)
Minister of Grace and Justice	Sebastiano Tecchio	Historical Left	(1867–1867)
Minister of Finance	Francesco Ferrara	Historical Left	(1867–1867)
Minister of War	Genova Giovanni Thaon di Revel	Military	(1867–1867)
Minister of the Navy	Federico Pescetto	Military	(1867–1867)
Minister of Agriculture, Industry and Commerce	Francesco De Blasiis	Historical Left	(1867–1867)
Minister of Public Works	Antonio Giovanola	Historical Left	(1867–1867)
Minister of Public Education	Michele Coppino	Historical Left	(1867–1867)
