= Vincenzo Maria Miglietti =

Italian politician and senator

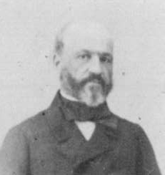

Minister of Justice
- In office 12 June 1861 – 3 March 1862
- Preceded by: Giovanni Battista Cassinis
- Succeeded by: Filippo Cordova

Senator of the Kingdom of Italy
- In office 24 May 1863 – 14 July 1864

Member of the Chamber of Deputies
- In office 18 February 1861 – 7 September 1865

Minister of Justice of the Kingdom of Sardinia
- In office 19 July 1859 – 21 January 1860
- Preceded by: Giovanni de Foresta
- Succeeded by: Giovanni Battista Cassinis

Deputy in the Parliament of Sardinia
- In office 20 December 1849 – 17 December 1860

Vincenzo Maria Miglietti (Moncalieri, 25 May 1809 – Nichelino, 14 July 1864) was an Italian politician and senator of the Kingdom. He was Minister of Justice and Ecclesiastical Affairs of the Kingdom of Italy in the first Ricasoli government.

== Life and career ==
Miglietti born in Moncalieri, near Turin to Dominico Miglietti and Michelangelo Gariglio. He graduated in law from the University of Turin and married Ferdinanda Bersezio by whom he had several children; Carlo Maria and Vittoria, who died in infancy; Maria Michela, who married Costantino Rodella, and Federica Vincenza.

He was first elected to the IV legislature of the Parliament of the Kingdom of Sardinia on 28 June 1852, and he was re-elected to the V, VI, VII legislatures, as well as to the VIII legislature under the Kingdom of Italy. He served as vice-president of the Chamber of Deputies from 11 February 1863 to 7 September 1865 and as president of the chamber from 11 February 1863 to 7 September 1865.

He was appointed Minister of Justice on 12 June 1861 and served until 3 March 1862. In this capacity he brought forward two bills on 29 November, proposing to bring the legal codes in Naples and in Sicily more closely into line with those of Piedmont. Neither initiative was successful.

On 24 May 1863 he was appointed to the senate.

== Honours ==
Grand'Ufficiale dell'Ordine dei Santi Maurizio e Lazzaro - ribbon for ordinary uniform

Grand Officer of the Order of Saints Maurice and Lazarus
