= First Menabrea government =

10th Government of Kingdom of Italy

Menabrea I government
- 10th Cabinet of Italy

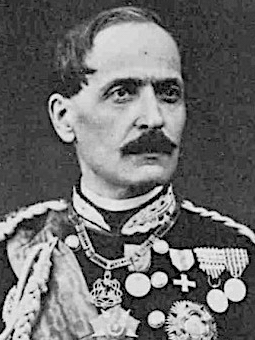
- Date formed: 27 October 1867
- Date dissolved: 5 January 1868

People and organisations
- Head of state: Victor Emmanuel II
- Head of government: Luigi Federico Menabrea
- Total no. of members: 9
- Member party: Historical Right

History
- Predecessor: Rattazzi II Cabinet
- Successor: Menabrea II Cabinet

The Menabrea I government of Italy held office from 27 October 1867 until 5 January 1868, a total of 70 days, or 2 months and 9 days.

== Government parties ==
The government was composed by the following parties:

Party	Ideology	Leader
Historical Right	Conservatism	Luigi Federico Menabrea

== Composition ==
Office	Name	Party	Term
Prime Minister	Luigi Federico Menabrea	Historical Right	(1867–1868)
Minister of the Interior	Filippo Antonio Gualterio	Historical Right	(1867–1868)
Minister of Foreign Affairs	Luigi Federico Menabrea	Historical Right	(1867–1868)
Minister of Grace and Justice	Adriano Mari	Historical Right	(1867–1868)
Minister of Finance	Luigi Guglielmo Cambray-Digny	Historical Right	(1867–1868)
Minister of War	Ettore Bertolè-Viale	Military	(1867–1868)
Minister of the Navy	Luigi Federico Menabrea	Historical Right	(1867–1867)
Minister of the Navy	Pompeo Provana del Sabbione	Military	(1867–1868)
Minister of Agriculture, Industry and Commerce	Luigi Guglielmo Cambray-Digny	Historical Right	(1867–1867)
Minister of Agriculture, Industry and Commerce	Emilio Broglio	Historical Right	(1867–1868)
Minister of Public Works	Girolamo Cantelli	Historical Right	(1867–1868)
Minister of Public Education	Emilio Broglio	Historical Right	(1867–1868)
