= Borgatti =

Borgatti is an Italian surname. Notable people with the surname include:

- Giuseppe Borgatti (1871–1950), Italian singer
- Francesco Borgatti (1818–1885), Italian politician and magistrate
- Renata Borgatti (1894–1964), Italian classical musician
- Stephen Borgatti (born 1956), American business professor and author
