= First Rattazzi government =

3rd Government of Kingdom of Italy

Rattazzi I government
- 3rd Cabinet of Italy

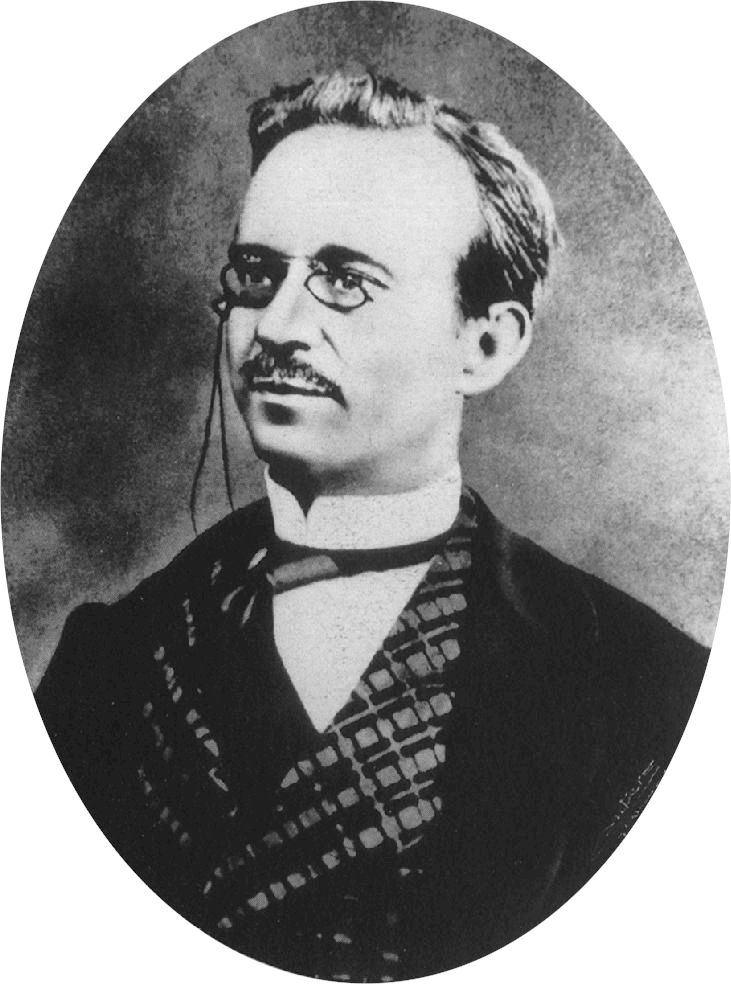
- Date formed: 3 March 1862
- Date dissolved: 8 December 1862

People and organisations
- Head of state: Victor Emmanuel II
- Head of government: Urbano Rattazzi
- Total no. of members: 9
- Member party: Historical Left; Historical Right

History
- Predecessor: Ricasoli I Cabinet
- Successor: Farini Cabinet

The Rattazzi I government of Italy held office from 3 March 1862 until 8 December 1862, a total of 280 days, or 9 months and 5 days.

== History ==
In consequence of the negotiations for the cession of Nice and Savoy to France, which cession Urbano Rattazzi opposed, he again retired in January 1860. On changing his views on this policy, he became president of the lower chamber in the first Italian Parliament, and in March 1862 succeeded Ricasoli in the government, retaining for himself the portfolios of Foreign Affairs and of the Interior. However, in consequence of his policy of repression towards Garibaldi at Aspromonte, he was driven from office in the following December.

== Government parties ==
The government was composed by the following parties:

| Party | Ideology | Leader |
|---|---|---|
| Historical Left | Liberalism | Urbano Rattazzi |
| Historical Right | Conservatism | Bettino Ricasoli |

== Composition ==
| Office | Name | Party | Term |
|---|---|---|---|
| Prime Minister | Urbano Rattazzi | Historical Left | (1862–1862) |
| Minister of the Interior | Urbano Rattazzi | Historical Left | (1862–1862) |
| Minister of Foreign Affairs | Urbano Rattazzi | Historical Left | (1862–1862) |
| Minister of Foreign Affairs | Giacomo Durando | Military | (1862–1862) |
| Minister of Grace and Justice | Filippo Cordova | Historical Right | (1861–1862) |
| Minister of Grace and Justice | Raffaele Conforti | Historical Left | (1862–1862) |
| Minister of Finance | Quintino Sella | Historical Right | (1862–1862) |
| Minister of War | Agostino Petitti Bagliani di Roreto | Military | (1862–1862) |
| Minister of the Navy | Carlo Pellion di Persano | Military | (1862–1862) |
| Minister of Agriculture, Industry and Commerce | Gioacchino Napoleone Pepoli | Historical Right | (1862–1862) |
| Minister of Public Works | Agostino Depretis | Historical Left | (1862–1862) |
| Minister of Public Education | Pasquale Stanislao Mancini | Historical Left | (1862–1862) |
| Minister of Public Education | Carlo Matteucci | Historical Left | (1862–1862) |
