= Pietro Bastogi =

Italian politician, financier and industrialist (1808–1899)

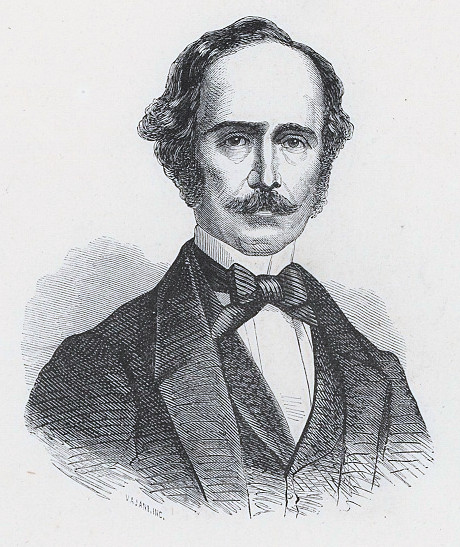

Minister of Finance
- In office 3 April 1861 – 6 June 1861
- Prime Minister: Camillo Benso, count of Cavour
- Preceded by: Saverio Francesco Vegezzi, (Kingdom of Sardinia)
- In office 12 June 1861 – 3 March 1862
- Prime Minister: Bettino Ricasoli
- Succeeded by: Quintino Sella

Senator
- In office 13 December 1890 – 21 February 1899

Deputy
- In office 18 February 1861 – 17 July 1864 (resigned)
- In office 24 May 1867 – 3 June 1868
- In office 5 December 1870 – 3 October 1876

Deputy (Kingdom of Sardinia)
- In office 2 April 1860 – 17 December 1860

Mayor of Florence
- In office 17 October 1879 – 27 January 1880
- Preceded by: Gaspero Barzellotti
- Succeeded by: Tommaso Corsini

Pietro Bastogi (Livorno, 15 March 1808 – Florence, 21 February 1899) was an Italian politician, financier and industrialist.

== Early life and career ==
Bastogi was born in 1808 in Livorno to Michelangelo Bastogi and his wife Riccarda Regini, into a family of merchants originally from Civitavecchia. In his youth he was attracted by patriotic ideas and joined Giuseppe Mazzini's Young Italy, where he also served as treasurer. A friend of Francesco Domenico Guerrazzi, in 1836 Bastogi helped him publish his work The Siege of Florence. In the meantime, he devoted himself to the family business, namely trade and finance, becoming a skilled businessman, with financial investments in both the public and private sectors. In 1847, Leopold II, Grand Duke of Tuscany asked for a loan from private Tuscan banks, including the Bastogi, who received as collateral the income from a mining company that held a government licence to exploit the iron mines of Follonica.

== Tuscan politics ==
After the Grand Duke granted the Constitution in 1848 Bastogi was elected a member of the new Tuscan parliament. In this capacity, he worked to establish units of Tuscan volunteers to support Charles Albert's Piedmontese army during the First War of Independence, attempting to mediate between moderate liberals and Guerrazzi's democrats. However, he shifted to a conservative position when the constitutional government adopted economic measures he deemed disastrous for the Tuscan economy, such as the issuance of treasury bonds to cover war expenses or the sale of state assets.

In 1849, after the fall of the constitutional government and the restoration of Leopold II, Bastogi became a government financier and major shareholder of the most important Tuscan financial companies, holding important positions, such as that of president of the Chamber of Commerce of Livorno. In this role he worked to ensure that the bank of his hometown merged with the Bank of Florence, giving rise in December 1857 to the Banca Nazionale Toscana, of which he became a shareholder and member of the board of directors. Bastogi became the spokesperson for the political and financial necessity of a "large loan with a mixed guarantee from France and Piedmont" and the support of the most important European banking house, that of the Rothschilds of Paris.

During the unification crisis of 1859-1860 and the definitive exile of the Grand Duke, Bastogi financially supported the establishment of groups of Tuscan volunteers, and later became a member of the Provisional Government of Tuscany presided over by Baron Bettino Ricasoli, who entrusted him with overseeing government finances through a loan from the Bank of Turin. Upon arriving in the Piedmontese capital, Bastogi, despite gaining the respect of Prime Minister Cavour, was unable to obtain the requested loan; for this reason he went to Paris, where he obtained a loan of twenty million lire from the Rothschild Bank. Immediately after the annexation of Tuscany to the Kingdom of Sardinia, elections were called to allow representatives of Lombardy and central Italy to enter the Subalpine Parliament. Bastogi was elected on 29 March 1860 for the constituencies of Cascina and Montepulciano.

== Italian government positions ==
Having entered Parliament, Bastogi sat on the benches of the Right, forming part of the Tuscan group led by Ricasoli. On 3 February 1861, elections were held to renew Parliament, to allow the entry of deputies from Southern Italy, recently conquered by Giuseppe Garibaldi. After being re-elected, Bastogi was invited to join the Cavour cabinet, accepting the role of the new Kingdom of Italy’s first Minister of Finance, a position he also held, after Cavour's death, in the first Ricasoli government. As minister, he brought about the unification of the public debts of the predecessor states, establishing the Great Book of the Public Debt. Other important measures he took were another ministerial project for a loan of half a billion lire and the introduction of the war tithe on all annexed territories and new stamp duties on mortmain property, industrial companies, mortgages, railway travel, on goods and on baggage, in order to try to fill the very large financial deficit of the new Italian state.

In 1861 he was made Count and Noble of Livorno in recognition for his services in unifying the public debt.

== Railway controversy ==
After the fall of the Ricasoli government on March 3, 1862, Bastogi returned to the life of an ordinary deputy, but did not forget the world of business. The unification of Italy meant the overcoming of old regional divisions and the new country’s public works policy opened up new business opportunities for large private firms. That same year, he founded the Banca Toscana di Credito and, shortly thereafter, created the Società Italiana per le Strade Ferrate Meridionali (now Bastogi SpA), a privately held company interested in winning contracts for the construction of the Italian railway network, of which he became president.

The objective of Bastogi’s new venture was to secure public contracts for the building of railways, but this immediately threatened the dominant interest in developing railways across Europe, led by the Rothschilds. By controlling the investment of so much French capital, they had succeeded up till then in preventing rival companies from taking on the construction and operating contracts for the Italian railway network. The Rothschilds' goal was to obtain the concession for the new central and southern railways, with the aim of connecting them with those of Lombardy, Veneto, and southern Austria, which they controlled either directly or through subsidiaries. They were able to persuade the first Rattazzi government to offer them a renewed the concession of the Lombard and Emilian lines up to Ancona, as well as the contract to complete the Adriatic line and its connection with Naples (16 June 1862).

The opposition in the Chamber of Deputies, when they became aware of the offer, argued that the state could have no political or economic interest in entrusting most of the country's railway network to a single, extremely powerful foreign company, particularly one that was also involved in the development of the Austrian railways. On July 31, 1862, as the Chamber of Deputies began discussing the offer, Bastogi sent a letter to the Minister of Public Works Agostino Depretis declaring that a group of Otaluan businessmen was prepared to invest one hundred million lire to establish a company for the construction and operation of railways in central and southern Italy. The proposal, immediately made known to the press and both houses of Parliament, caused a great stir. Prime Minister Rattazzi and Minister of Public Works Depretis defended the validity of the agreement with the Rothschilds, which still required parliamentary agreement. The Chamber of Deputies, in its sessions of August 3, 4, 5, and 6 1862, voted against the Rothschild agreement and approved Bastogi’s proposal: thus came about the first major enterprise of Italian national capitalism. Construction work began immediately and the Company managed, despite a virulent smear campaign launched by its opponents, to deliver its commitments: by 1865 it completed the Ancona-Brindisi and the Foggia-Naples lines, two of the main arteries of the southern system.

Accusations of corruption and profiteering by Bastogi and his associates, fomented by rivals and echoed by opposition newspapers, circulated in Parliament. Eventually, in 1864, the Chamber appointed a commission of inquiry, headed by Giovanni Lanza, concluded by condemning Bastogi and other deputies. Lanza found confirmed that Susani, a member of the parliamentary commission that had rejected the agreement with the Rothschilds, had been paid one million and one hundred thousand lire by Bastogi. It also found that Bastogi had obtained from all the signatories to his new company a declaration granting him the general contract for the execution of the works at a price of 210,000 lire per kilometer, and that he had then subcontracted the work to three firms at a price of 198,000 lire per kilometer; two-thirds of this 14 million lire margin was apparently pocketed by Bastogi himself.

Bastogi immediately resigned his seat in parliament and returned to private life, concerned above all else with safeguarding the interests of the company he had created. In 1868, he was again elected from the Campobasso constituency, but refused to serve again in the Chamber of Deputies. This did not prevent the electors of Manfredonia and Livorno from calling him on the same day to represent them in Parliament in 1870, just as later, in 1874 and 1876, the same electors of Livorno repeatedly confirmed his mandate. But Count Bastogi no longer felt drawn to public life, and in 1875 he preferred to resign his seat so that Livorno could assert its rights regarding the railway agreements, in which he was particularly interested, which were about to be discussed in Parliament at that time.

After being re-elected in 1870, Bastogi contributed to the fall of the Right from government by voting, together with the Tuscan group, on March 18, 1876, against the government bill on the nationalization of the railways. This allowed the Left, represented by Agostino Depretis, to form a government. Bastogi remained a member of parliament until 1880.

== Later life, legacy and personal life ==
After his nomination as senator on 4 December 1890, Bastogi became disinterested in politics and dedicated himself more actively to the financial world, also promoting the organisation of economic studies. The last major commitment of the group headed by Bastogi dates back to 1879 with the creation of Fondiaria : an Italian fixed-premium fire insurance company, whose first policy was issued in favour of the Bastogi counts. This company too would be run for a long time with the same style of careful investments and wise distribution of profits that had characterised Bastogi's investment management. Bastogi died in Florence on 21 February 1899, at the age of 90. He left a fortune of 17,247,073 lire – consisting mainly of securities, after he had donated real estate to his children during his lifetime – and 50,000 autographs to the Labronica Library, a reminder of his erudite cultural commitment. He was buried in the monumental cemetery of the Misericordia in Livorno.

Bastogi married Adele Caputi by whom he had three children, Giovanni Angelo, Gioacchino who became a senator, and Enricheyya, who married Michelangelo Bastogi.

== Autograph Library ==
Since 1927, the Bastogi Autograph Library has been kept at the Labronica Library in Livorno, a vast collection of around 60,000 autographs collected by Count Pietro Bastogi and his sons Gioacchino and Giovannangelo throughout the nineteenth century. Donated by his heirs to the Municipality of Livorno in 1923, it covers a historical period from the end of the fifteenth century to the beginning of the twentieth century and contains the handwritten testimonies of all the main men of letters, scientists, politicians, historians and rulers of the European scene.

== Archive ==
The documentation relating to the activity of the Società Italiana per le Strade Ferrate Meridionali, which later became Bastogi SpA, is preserved in the Bastogi Historical Archive, declared of notable historical interest in 1984 by the Archival Superintendency of Lombardy, and was transferred from the State Archives of Milan to the Fondazione Istituto per la storia dell'età contemporanea (ISEC) in July 2002.

== Honours ==
Grand'Ufficiale dell'Ordine dei Santi Maurizio e Lazzaro - ribbon for ordinary uniform

Grand Officer of the Order of Saints Maurice and Lazarus

Grand'Ufficiale dell'Ordine della Corona d'Italia - ribbon for ordinary uniform

Grand Officer of the Order of the Crown of Italy
