= Second Ricasoli government =

8th government of Kingdom of Italy

Ricasoli II government
- 8th Cabinet of Italy

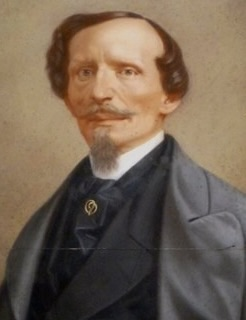
- Date formed: 20 June 1866
- Date dissolved: 10 April 1867

People and organisations
- Head of state: Victor Emmanuel II
- Head of government: Bettino Ricasoli
- Total no. of members: 9
- Member party: Historical Right; Historical Left
- Status in legislature: National unity government

History
- Predecessor: La Marmora III Cabinet
- Successor: Rattazzi II Cabinet

The second Ricasoli government of the Kingdom of Italy, also known as the Government of National Reconciliation (Italian: governo di conciliazione nazionale) because it led the country during the Third Italian War of Independence, held office from 20 June 1866 until 10 April 1867, a total of 294 days, or 9 months and 21 days. Composed of the Historical Right and Historical Left, it was led by Bettino Ricasoli of the Historical Right.

== History ==
As Prime Minister of Italy, Ricasoli refused Napoleon III's offer to cede Veneto (at that time part of the Kingdom of Lombardy–Venetia) to Italy on condition that Italy should abandon the Prussian alliance, and also refused the Prussian decoration of the Black Eagle because Alfonso Ferraro La Marmora, author of the alliance, was not to receive it. Upon the departure of the French troops from Rome at the end of 1866, he again attempted to conciliate the Holy See with a convention in virtue of which Italy would have restored to the Catholic Church the property of the suppressed religious orders in return for the gradual payment of 24,000,000. To mollify the Vatican, he conceded the exequatur to forty-five bishops inimical to the Italian government. The Vatican accepted his proposal; however, the Chamber of Deputies proved refractory, and although dissolved by Ricasoli, it returned more hostile than before. Without waiting for a vote, Ricasoli resigned from office and practically disappeared from political life.

== Government parties ==
Party	Ideology	Leader
Historical Right	Conservatism	Bettino Ricasoli
Historical Left	Liberalism	Urbano Rattazzi

== Composition ==
Office	Name	Party	Term
Prime Minister	Bettino Ricasoli	Historical Right	(1866–1867)
Minister of the Interior	Bettino Ricasoli	Historical Right	(1866–1867)
Minister of Foreign Affairs	Bettino Ricasoli	Historical Right	(1866–1866)
Minister of Foreign Affairs	Emilio Visconti Venosta	Historical Right	(1866–1867)
Minister of Grace and Justice	Francesco Borgatti	Historical Right	(1866–1867)
Minister of Grace and Justice	Bettino Ricasoli	Historical Right	(1867–1867)
Minister of Grace and Justice	Filippo Cordova	Historical Right	(1867–1867)
Minister of Finance	Antonio Scialoja	Historical Right	(1866–1867)
Minister of Finance	Agostino Depretis	Historical Left	(1867–1867)
Minister of War	Ignazio De Genova	Military	(1866–1866)
Minister of War	Efisio Cugia	Military	(1866–1867)
Minister of the Navy	Agostino Depretis	Historical Left	(1866–1867)
Minister of the Navy	Giuseppe Biancheri	Historical Right	(1867–1867)
Minister of Agriculture, Industry and Commerce	Filippo Cordova	Historical Right	(1866–1867)
Minister of Public Works	Stefano Jacini	Historical Right	(1866–1867)
Minister of Public Works	Giuseppe Devincenzi	Historical Right	(1867–1867)
Minister of Public Education	Domenico Berti	Historical Right	(1866–1867)
Minister of Public Education	Cesare Correnti	Historical Right	(1867–1867)
