= Francesco Borgatti =

Italian politician (1818–1885)

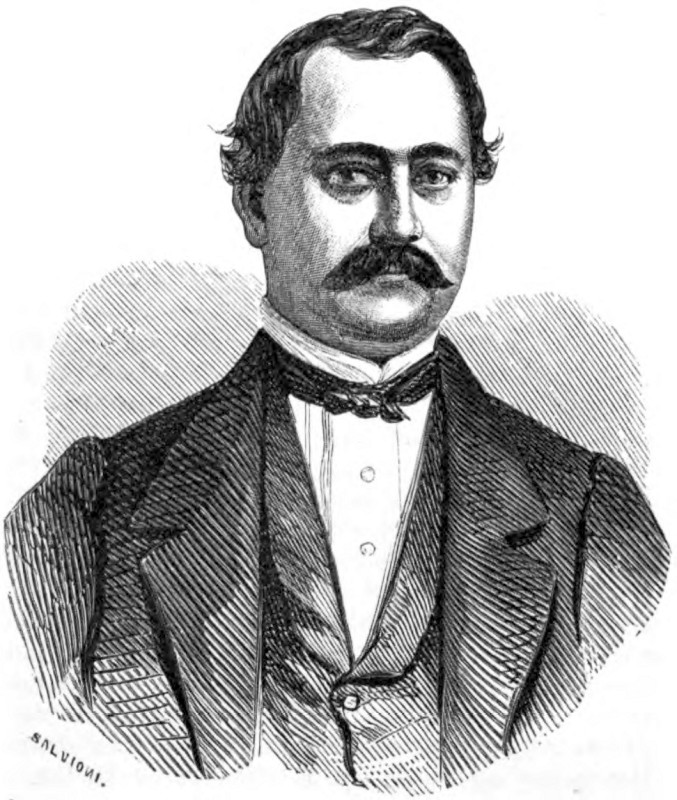

Minister of Justice
- In office 20 June 1866 – 17 February 1867
- Preceded by: Giovanni De Falco
- Succeeded by: Bettino Ricasoli (interim)

Senator of the Kingdom of Italy
- In office 16 November 1871 – 14 April 1885

Member of the Chamber of Deputies
- In office 18 February 1861 – = 2 April 1871

Deputy in the Parliament of Sardinia
- In office 2 April 1860 – 12 December 1860

Francesco Borgatti (30 May 1818 – 14 April 1885) was an Italian politician and magistrate.

== Early life ==
Borgatti was born in Corporeno, Ferrara, the son of Giuseppe Borgatti and Maria Bitelli. He obtained a law degree from the University of Bologna in 1842 and as well as practicing law, he collaborated in the publishing of Il Panorama, an artistic- and literary periodical published in Rome in 1846. He then joined Michele Mannucci in publishing La Speranza, a political newspaper of moderate tendencies.

Borgatti began his political career in his native Papal States following the election of Pius IX. In May 1848 he was entrusted with the general secretariat of the Papal Ministry of Foreign Affairs, a position he also held during the Roman Republic. After the French army seized Rome, he was forced to abandon the city and went back to Bologna and to his legal work, only returning to political activity in June 1859.

== Political career ==
Borgatti was elected first to the VII legislature of the Parliament of the Kingdom of Sardinia on 2 April 1860, and was re-elected to the VIII, IX, X and XI legislatures of the Kingdom of Italy, serving until 2 April 1871.

Borgatti served as Minister of Justice of the Kingdom of Italy in the second Ricasoli government. In this capacity he presented, together with Minister of Finance Antonio Scialoja, a bill that would have ensured the financial stability of the kingdom by selling off Church property while guaranteeing the freedom of the Catholic Church. Proceeds from the sale were to be handed over to the Church, with a deduction of 600,000,000 francs to be retained by the State. These measures were opposed by both the clerical world and the left and failure to push them through led to the fall of the cabinet.

The enduring question for justice ministers of the time was the enormous task of trying to unify the legal systems of the old Kingdom of Sardinia with those of the newly-annexed territories. In the debates on this question in the 1860s Borgetti’s contributions were marked by moderation. In particular he was opposed to over hasty imposition of uniformity, and indeed in 1865 voted against the adoption of new legal codes, although the Chamber passed them. He was also in favour of allowing a fairly decentralized system of regional government.

Having relinquished his seat in the Chamber of Deputies, he was appointed to the Senate on 16 November 1871. He served as Vice President of the Senate for three terms: 14 November 1876 – 2 May 1880, 25 May 1880 – 25 September 1882 and 16 November 1882 – 14 April 1885.

Borgatti died in Florence on 14 April 1885, at the age of 66.

== Honours ==
Grand cordon of the Order of the Crown of Italy - ribbon for ordinary uniform

Grand cordon of the Order of the Crown of Italy

Grand Officer of the Order of Saints Maurice and Lazarus - ribbon for ordinary uniform

Grand Officer of the Order of Saints Maurice and Lazarus
