= Raffaele Conforti =

Italian politician

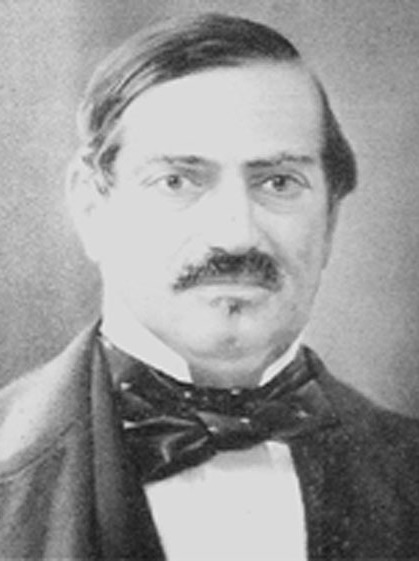

Minister of Justice
- In office 7 April 1862 – 8 December 1862
- Monarch: Vittorio Emanuele II
- Prime Minister: Urbano Rattazzi
- Preceded by: Filippo Cordova
- Succeeded by: Giuseppe Pisanelli
- In office 24 March 1878 – 19 December 1878
- Monarch: Umberto I
- Prime Minister: Benedetto Cairoli
- Preceded by: Pasquale Stanislao Mancini
- Succeeded by: Diego Tajani

Senator
- In office 30 June 1867 – 3 August 1880

Member of the Sardinian Parliament
- In office 5 July 1860 – 17 December 1860

Member of the Parliament of the Kingdom of Italy
- In office 26 January 1861 – 7 September 1865

Raffaele Conforti (Calvanico, 4 October 1804 – Caserta, 3 August 1880) was an Italian politician and senator of the Kingdom of Italy. He was a leading figure of the Risorgimento and the unification of Italy.

== Biography ==
Attorney General of the Grand Criminal Court of Naples, in 1848 he was appointed Minister of the Interior in the constitutional government of the Kingdom of the Two Sicilies led by Carlo Troya. After the restoration of Ferdinand II of the Two Sicilies, Conforti, who had managed to leave Naples, was sentenced to death in absentia on 1 October 1853.

Having taken refuge in Piedmont, he practiced as a lawyer in Genoa and Turin. He was elected as a deputy to the Subalpine Parliament from the Broni constituency. He supported the Expedition of the Thousand. He returned to Naples following the amnesty granted to the exiles by Francis II of the Two Sicilies, on the eve of the arrival of Garibaldi. During the general's dictatorship he was appointed Minister of the Interior, and in this capacity he organized the plebiscite in Naples and it was he who presented the result to Victor Emmanuel II.

In 1861 he was elected to the VIII legislature, representing Mercato San Severino. He was Minister of Justice in the Rattazzi I government before losing his seat in 1865. He was appointed senator in 1867 and became vice-president of the Senate as well as serving as Minister of Justice a second time in the Cairoli I government. His son it:Luigi Conforti was a poet and historical essayist.

He is remembered in the Cemetery of Poggioreale, in the enclosure of illustrious men, with a monument inaugurated on 3 July 1892. The work was designed by the architect Giuseppe Pisanti and created by the sculptor Carmelo Gatto.

== Honours ==
Cavaliere di Gran Croce dell'Ordine dei Santi Maurizio e Lazzaro - ribbon for ordinary uniform

Knight of the Grand Cross of the Order of Saints Maurice and Lazarus

Cavaliere di Gran Croce dell'Ordine della Corona d'Italia - ribbon for ordinary uniform

Knight of the Grand Cross of the Order of the Crown of Italy
