= Giovanni Battista Cassinis =

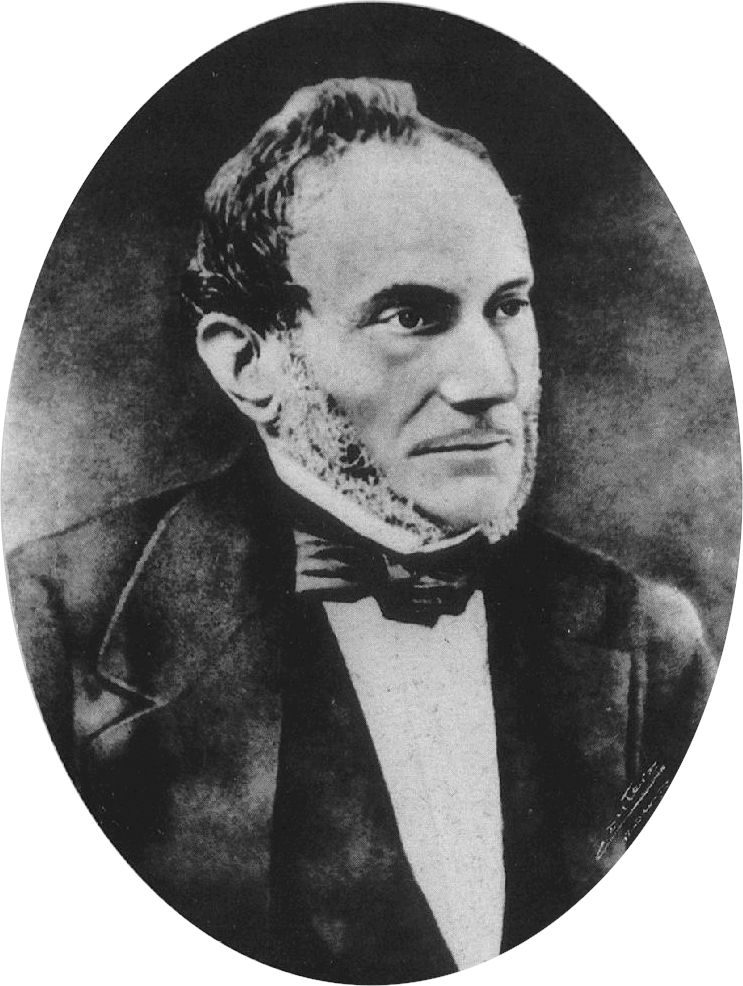

President of the Chamber of Deputies
- In office 25 May 1863 – 7 September 1865
- Preceded by: Sebastiano Tecchio
- Succeeded by: Adriano Mari

Minister of Justice
- In office 23 March 1861 – 6 June 1861
- Preceded by: Giovanni Battista Cassinis, Kingdom of Sardinia
- Succeeded by: Vincenzo Maria Miglietti

Senator of the Kingdom of Italy
- In office 10 August 1865 – 18 December 1866

Member of the Chamber of Deputies
- In office 18 February 1861 – 7 September 1865

Minister of Justice of the Kingdom of Sardinia
- In office 21 January 1860 – 22 March 1861
- Preceded by: Vincenzo Maria Miglietti
- Succeeded by: Giovanni Battista Cassinis, Kingdom of Italy

Deputy of the Kingdom of Sardinia
- In office 8 May 1848 – 17 December 1860

Giovanni Battista Cassinis (25 February 1806 – 18 December 1866) was a jurist of the Turin bar and a statesman in the Kingdom of Italy.

== Early life ==
Giovanni Battista was born in Masserano, the son of Orazio Cassinis and Orsola dei Conti Avogadro Di Quaregas. He was a student prodigy, graduating in law from the University of Turin at the age of nineteen.

== Early legal and political career ==
Cassinis entered the chambers of the famous lawyer Prigione and established a name for himself in the theoretical analysis of law, publishing dissertations on the death penalty and the rights of the church. In 1830 he was invited to join the Collegio dei Dottori and also began to edit the Annals of Jurisprudence.

Cassinis' political career began in his region of origin, first as a municipal councillor in his native Masserano in 1848, then as representative of the Salussola constituency in the first legislature of the Subalpine Parliament. He was re-elected deputy in the fourth legislature, becoming one of the major collaborators of Camillo Benso, Count of Cavour. In 1857 Cavour entrusted him with a case concerning the water rights of people living on his estates, which Cassinis won. He was offered the position of Minister of Justice several times, but always turned it down.

== Minister of Justice ==
In 1860, under Cavour, Cassinis eventually became Minister of Justice, focusing his activity on the extension of the Piedmontese legal codes to the recently annexed provinces and on the development of a new Civil Code.

Among his first acts as minister was the decree of 25 February 1860 with which he brought together the two commissions previously charged with unifying the law. The first, appointed by Farini in November 1859 for the provinces of Emilia and the other established in Turin in December by Rattazzi and composed of Piedmontese and Lombard jurists. The new commission, in which some Tuscan jurists to ensure representation to all parts of the expanding Kingdom of Italy, worked extremely quickly on the revision of the Albertine code. However Cassinis’ attempts to push the proposed new legal code through parliament without the usual scrutiny met with hostility. Failing in his first effort, he decided instead to simply impose the law of Savoy onto Emilia.

In October of the same year he assumed the position of Minister of the Interior, a role which led him to carry out a long mission in southern Italy aimed at accelerating the national unification procedure.

== Later career ==
Three years later, on 26 May 1863, he was elected President of the Chamber of Deputies in the VIII legislature. Under his mandate, the proposal for a bill to combat brigandage was voted on. He also played an important role in the negotiations for the September Convention between Italy and France.

Cassinis was appointed senator of the Kingdom on 8 October 1865, but only a year later, on 18 December 1866, he committed suicide in Turin. This followed what he felt were some misjudgements on his part involving some important political appointments.

== Legacy ==
On the bicentenary of his birth, in 2006, his native municipality dedicated some conferences and various commemorative events to him, and a commemorative postmark was issued. In the lower village of Masserano, where he was born, a plaque commemorates him. Some historical documents and a small bust are exhibited in the Palazzo dei Principi.

In Turin, Cassinis is remembered with a statue located in the Piazza Arbarello which describes him as “Most upright of mind, most cultured of genius, in the Turin forum a capable jurist, in the Kingdom of Italy, a meritorious statesman who worthily held the offices of Keeper of the Seals, President of the Chamber of Deputies and Senator. He deserved and enjoyed universal esteem and respect.”

Cassinis is buried in the monumental cemetery of Turin.

== Honours ==
Knight of the Order of Saints Maurice and Lazarus - ribbon for ordinary uniform

Knight of the Order of Saints Maurice and Lazarus
