= Giovanni Lanza =

Italian politician (1810–1882)

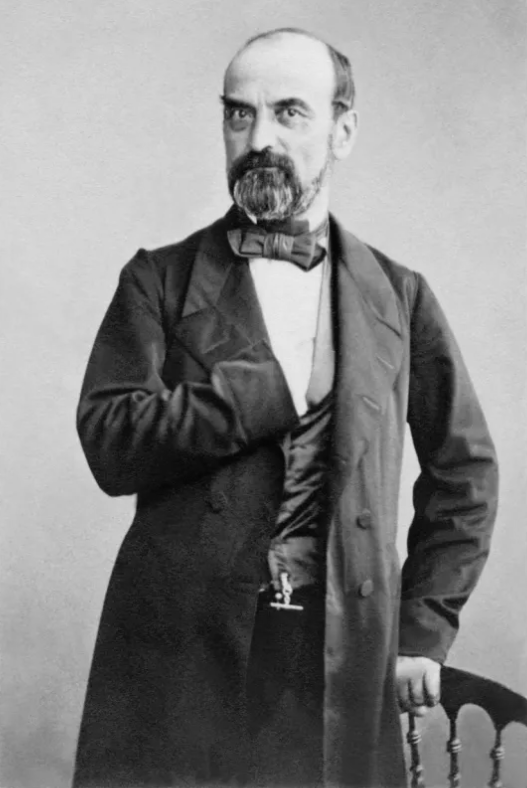
- Lanza in 1865

Prime Minister of Italy
- In office 14 December 1869 – 10 July 1873
- Monarch: Victor Emmanuel II
- Preceded by: Luigi Federico Menabrea
- Succeeded by: Marco Minghetti

Personal details
- Born: 15 February 1810 Casale Monferrato, French Empire
- Died: 9 March 1882 (aged 72) Rome, Kingdom of Italy
- Party: Historical Right

Domenico Giovanni Giuseppe Maria Lanza (15 February 1810 – 9 March 1882) was an Italian politician and the eighth prime minister of Italy from 1869 to 1873.

== Biography ==
Lanza was born in the Piedmontese city of Casale Monferrato. He studied medicine in Turin, the capital of the Kingdom of Sardinia, then returned to Casale where he divided his energies between practising medicine and developing his 33-hectare estate in nearby Roncaglia. He studied and wrote on agricultural developments in both the practical and social aspects. Lanza was among the first in Monferrato to introduce such modern equipment as iron ploughs and seed drills, and also involved himself in the agricultural education of poor children, hoping to achieve at once “the betterment of our agriculture and the moral and intellectual betterment of our agricultural workers.”

Lanza was also an active member of the Subalpine Agricultural Association of Turin and became its secretary. The association was concerned about reforming the political and economic spheres, as well as agriculture, and its identification with the cause of liberal nationalism—with the Risorgimento—was underlined at the September 1847 agrarian congress in Casale, when Lanza raised the cry of "Viva l'Italia libera ed indipendente!" Later he commented on that event: "I did not join the association purely to improve the cultivation of cabbages".^{,}

== Parliamentary collaboration with Cavour ==
Lanza took an active part in the uprising of 1848 and was elected to the Piedmont Parliament that same year. He attached himself to the party of Cavour and devoted his attention chiefly to questions of the economy and finance. He became minister of education in 1855 in the Cavour cabinet, and in 1858 minister of finance. He was minister of the interior (1864–1865) in the La Marmora cabinet, and arranged the transfer of the capital to Florence. He maintained a resolute opposition to the financial policies of Menabrea, who resigned in 1869 when Lanza was elected for the second time as President of the Chamber.

== Prime Minister of Italy ==
Lanza formed a new cabinet in which he appointed himself minister of the interior. With Quintino Sella as minister of finance, he sought to reorganize the Italian budget and resigned from office when Sella's projects were rejected in 1873.

=== Legacy in the Unification of Italy ===
His cabinet had seen the accomplishment of Italian unity and the installation of an Italian government in Rome after the defeat of the Papal States in late 1870.

== Notes ==
Political offices
Preceded by Luigi Cibrario	Piedmontese Minister of Education; 1855–1858	Succeeded by Carlo Cadorna
Preceded by The Count of Cavour	Piedmontese Minister of Finances; 1858–1859	Succeeded by Giovanni Battista Oytana
Preceded by Urbano Rattazzi	Chairman of the Piedmontese Chamber of Deputies; 1860	Succeeded by Urbano Rattazzi
Preceded by Ubaldino Peruzzi	Italian Minister of the Interior; 1864–1865	Succeeded by Giuseppe Natoli
Preceded by Adriano Mari	Chairman of the Italian Chamber of Deputies; 1867–1869	Succeeded by Giuseppe Branchieri
Preceded by Luigi Federico Menabrea	Prime Minister of Italy; 1869–1873	Succeeded by Marco Minghetti
Preceded by Antonio Starabba di Rudinì	Italian Minister of the Interior; 1869–1873	Succeeded by Girolamo Cantelli
