= Luigi Federico Menabrea =

Italian politician, scientist and mathematician (1809–1896)

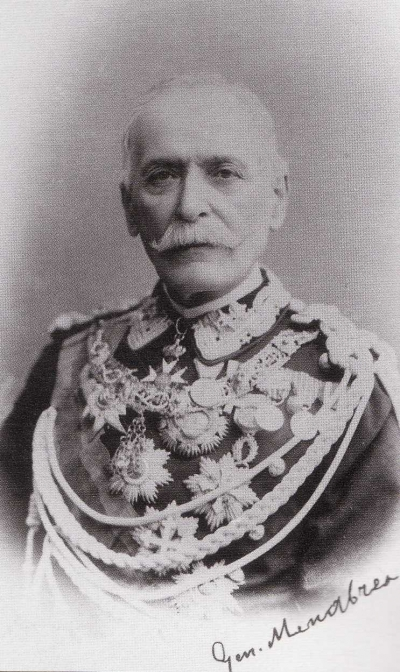

Prime Minister of Italy
- In office 27 October 1867 – 14 December 1869
- Monarch: Victor Emmanuel II
- Preceded by: Urbano Rattazzi
- Succeeded by: Giovanni Lanza

Minister of the Navy of Italy
- In office 12 June 1861 – 3 March 1862
- Monarch: Victor Emmanuel II
- Prime Minister: Camillo Benso
- Preceded by: Camillo Benso
- Succeeded by: Carlo Pellion di Persano
- Interim; 22 January – 25 January 1863
- Monarch: Victor Emmanuel II
- Prime Minister: Luigi Carlo Farini
- Preceded by: Giovanni Ricci
- Succeeded by: Orazio Di Negro
- Interim; 27 October – 8 November 1867
- Monarch: Victor Emmanuel II
- Prime Minister: Himself
- Preceded by: Federico Pescetto
- Succeeded by: Pompeo Provana del Sabbione

Minister of Public Works of Italy
- In office 8 December 1862 – 28 September 1864
- Monarch: Victor Emmanuel II
- Prime Minister: Luigi Carlo Farini; Marco Minghetti
- Preceded by: Agostino Depretis
- Succeeded by: Stefano Jacin

Minister of Foreign Affairs of Italy
- In office 27 October 1867 – 14 December 1869
- Monarch: Victor Emmanuel II
- Prime Minister: Himself
- Preceded by: Pompeo Di Campello
- Succeeded by: Emilio Visconti Venosta

Ambassador of Italy to the United Kingdom
- In office 10 March 1876 – 24 December 1882
- Monarchs: Victor Emmanuel II; Umberto I
- Prime Minister: Marco Minghetti; Agostino Depretis; Benedetto Cairoli
- Minister of Foreign Affairs: Emilio Visconti Venosta; Luigi Amedeo Melegari; Agostino Depretis; Benedetto Cairoli (as interim); Luigi Corti; Benedetto Cairoli; Agostino Depretis (as interim); Benedetto Cairoli; Pasquale Stanislao Mancini
- Preceded by: Carlo Cadorna
- Succeeded by: Carlo Felice Nicolis

Personal details
- Born: 4 September 1809 Chambéry, First French Empire
- Died: 24 May 1896 (aged 86) Saint-Cassin, French Third Republic
- Party: Historical Right

Luigi Federico Menabrea (4 September 1809 – 24 May 1896), later made 1st Count Menabrea and 1st Marquess of Valdora, was an Italian statesman, general, diplomat, and mathematician who served as the seventh prime minister of Italy from 1867 to 1869.

== Biography ==
Menabrea was born at Chambéry, then part of the First French Empire. He was educated at the University of Turin, where he qualified as an engineer and became a doctor of mathematics. As an officer of engineers he replaced Cavour in 1831 at the fortress of Bard. He then became professor of mechanics and construction at the military academy and at the university of Turin. Among his notable publications: Sketch of the Analytical Engine Invented by Charles Babbage, Esq. with notes by translator Ada Lovelace (1842), which described many aspects of computer architecture and is considered the first modern example of programming. Both are available on Wikisource:

- The Menabrea article
- The notes by Ada Lovelace.

King Charles Albert sent him in 1848 on diplomatic missions to secure the adhesion of Modena and Parma to Sardinia. He entered the Piedmontese parliament, and was attached successively to the Ministries of War and Foreign Affairs.

Menabrea belonged to the right centre, and until the events of 1859 he believed in the possibility of a compromise between the Vatican and the state. He was major-general and commander-in-chief of the engineers in the Lombard campaign of 1859. He superintended the siege works against Peschiera, was present at Palestro and Solferino, and repaired the fortifications of some of the northern fortresses. In 1860 he became lieutenant-general and conducted the siege of Gaeta. He was appointed senator and received the title of count.

Entering the Ricasoli cabinet of 1861 as minister for the navy, he held the portfolio of public works until 1864 in the succeeding Farini and Minghetti cabinets. After the war of 1866, he was chosen as Italian plenipotentiary for the negotiation of the Treaty of Prague and for the transfer of Venetia to Italy. In October 1867, he succeeded Rattazzi in the premiership, and was called upon to deal with the difficult situation created by Garibaldi's invasion of the Papal States and by the catastrophe of Mentana.

Menabrea disavowed Garibaldi and instituted judicial proceedings against him; but in negotiations with the French government he protested against the retention of the temporal power by the pope and insisted on the Italian right of interference in Rome. He was in on the secret of the direct negotiations between Victor Emmanuel and Napoleon III in June 1869, and refused to entertain the idea of a French alliance unless Italy were allowed to occupy the Papal States, and, on occasion, Rome itself. On the eve of the assembly of the Oecumenical Council at Rome Menabrea reserved to the Italian government its right in respect of any measures directed against Italian institutions.

He withdrew from seminary students in 1860 the exemption from military service which they had hitherto enjoyed. Throughout his term of office he was supported by the finance minister Count Cambray Digny, who forced through parliament the grist tax proposed by Quintino Sella, though in an altered form from the earlier proposal. After a series of changes in the cabinet, and many crises, Menabrea resigned in December 1869 on the election of a new chamber in which he did not command a majority. He was made marquis of Valdora in 1875. His successor in the premiership, Giovanni Lanza, in order to remove him from his influential position as aide-de-camp to the king, sent him to London as ambassador, where he remained until in 1882 he replaced General Cialdini at the Paris Embassy. Ten years later he withdrew from public life, and died at Saint Cassin on 24 May 1896.

== Publications ==
- "Notions sur la machine analytique de M. Charles Babbage", Bibliothèque universelle de Genève, nouvelle série 41 (1842) p. 352–76 (23 pages). Available via Bibnum (fr).
  - Its translation by Ada Lovelace: "Sketch of the Analytical Engine Invented by Charles Babbage . . . with Notes by the Translator", Scientific Memoirs, Selected from the Transactions of Foreign Academies of Science and Learned Societies 3 (1843): 666–731. Available online at Fourmilab and York University.
- "Letter to the Editor of Cosmos". Cosmos. Vol. 6. 1855. pp 421–422. Published online by Wired magazine.

== Sources ==
Political offices
Preceded by Urbano Rattazzi	Prime Minister of Italy; 1867–1869	Succeeded by Giovanni Lanza
Preceded by Pompeo Di Campello	Italian Minister of Foreign Affairs; 1867–1869	Succeeded by Emilio Visconti-Venosta
Preceded by Agostino Depretis	Italian Minister of Public Works; 1862–1864	Succeeded by Stefano Jacini
Preceded by Camillo Benso, Count of Cavour; Federico Pescetto	Italian Minister of the Navy; 1861–1862; 1867	Succeeded by Carlo Pellion di Persano; Pompeo Provana del Sabbione
