= Pompeo Di Campello =

Italian politician

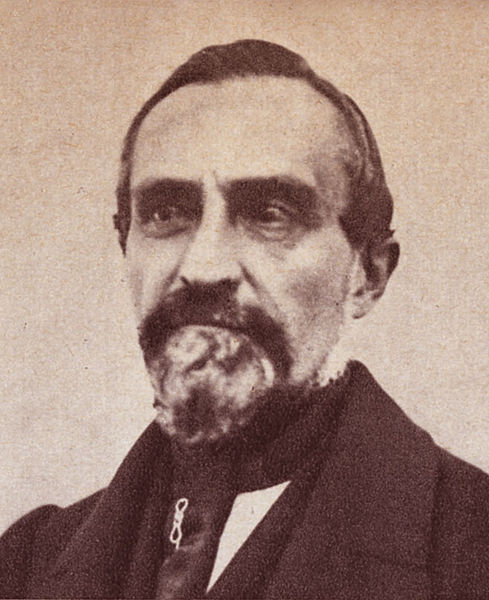
Pompeo Di Campello

Pompeo Di Campello (15 February 1803, Spoleto – 24 June 1884, Spoleto) was an Italian politician who served as Minister of Foreign Affairs in the Kingdom of Italy from 12 April 26 October 1867. He also served in the Senate of the Kingdom of Sardinia and the Kingdom of Italy.

Preceded by Emilio, marquis Visconti-Venosta	Minister of Foreign Affairs of the Kingdom of Italy; 1867	Succeeded by Luigi Federico, conte Menabrea
