= Quintino Sella =

Italian politician (1827–1884)

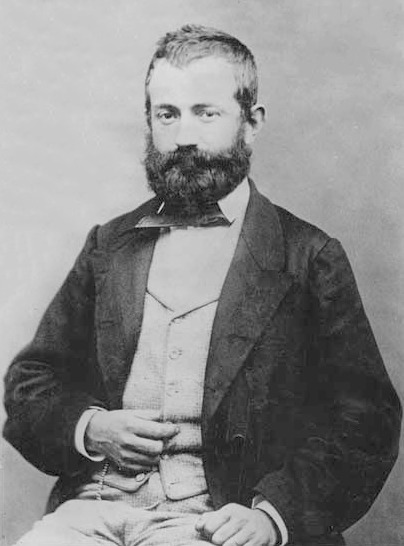

Minister of Finances
- In office 14 December 1869 – 10 July 1873
- Monarch: Victor Emmanuel II
- Prime Minister: Giovanni Lanza
- Preceded by: Luigi Guglielmo Cambray-Digny
- Succeeded by: Marco Minghetti
- In office 28 September 1864 – 31 December 1865
- Prime Minister: Alfonso La Marmora
- Preceded by: Marco Minghetti
- Succeeded by: Antonio Scialoja
- In office 3 March 1862 – 8 December 1862
- Prime Minister: Urbano Rattazzi
- Preceded by: Pietro Bastogi
- Succeeded by: Marco Minghetti

Member of the Chamber of Deputies
- In office 18 February 1861 – 25 September 1882
- Constituency: Cossato

Personal details
- Born: 7 July 1827 Sella di Mosso, Piedmont-Sardinia
- Died: 14 March 1884 (aged 56) Biella, Italy
- Party: Historical Right
- Education: University of Turin
- Profession: Economist, mineralogist

Quintino Sella (Italian pronunciation: [kwinˈtino ˈsɛlla]; 7 July 1827 – 14 March 1884) was an Italian politician, economist and mountaineer.

== Biography ==
Sella was born at Sella di Mosso, in the Province of Biella.

After studying engineering at Turin, he was sent in 1843 to study mineralogy at the Parisian School of Mines (Mines ParisTech). In Paris he witnessed the revolution of 1848, and only returned to Turin in 1852, when he taught applied geometry at the technical institute. In 1853 he became professor of mathematics at the university, and in 1860 professor of mineralogy in the school of applied engineering.

In 1860 he was elected deputy for Cossato. Two years later he was selected to be secretary-general of public instruction and in 1862 received from Rattazzi the portfolio of finance. The Rattazzi cabinet fell before Sella could efficaciously provide for the deficit of £17,500,000 with which he was confronted; but in 1864 he returned to the ministry of finance in the La Marmora cabinet, and dealt energetically with the deficit of £8,000,000 then existing. Persuading the king to forgo £120,000 of his civil list, and his colleagues in the cabinet to relinquish part of their ministerial stipends, he effected savings amounting to £2,400,000, proposed new taxation to the extent of £1,600,000, and induced landowners to pay one year's instalment of the land tax in advance.

A vote of the chamber compelled him to resign before his preparations for financial restoration were complete; but in 1869 he returned to the ministry of finance in a cabinet formed by himself, but of which he made over the premiership to Giovanni Lanza. By means of the grist tax (which he had proposed in 1865, but which the Menabrea cabinet had passed in 1868), and by other fiscal expedients necessitated by the almost desperate condition of the national exchequer, he succeeded, before his fall from power in 1873, in placing Italian finance upon a sound footing, in spite of fierce attacks and persistent misrepresentation.

In 1870 his great political influence turned the scale against interference in favour of France against Prussia, and in favour of an immediate occupation of Rome. From 1873 until his premature death, he acted as leader of the Right (Destra Storica) and was more than once prevented by an ephemeral coalition of personal opponents from returning to power as head of a Moderate Conservative cabinet. After the failure of an attempt to form a cabinet in May 1881, he practically retired from public life, devoting himself to his studies and his linen factory.

Quintino Sella died in 1884 and was buried at Oropa where a pyramid was erected by the engineer Carlo Maggia as his monument; the implied anti-clericalism of this choice of an ‘Egyptian’ style matched Sella's rôle in the occupation of Rome.

A passionate alpinist, he had found time during his political career to found the Club Alpino Italiano and a number of its mountain huts are named in his honour. He was also involved in the competition for the first ascent of the Matterhorn and he was portrayed in several related films such as The Mountain Calls and The Challenge.

His Discorsi parlamentari was published (5 vols., 1887–1890) by order of the Chamber of Deputies. An account of his life and his scientific labours was given by A Cossa in the Proceedings of the Accademia dei Lincei (1884–1885).

The mineral sellaite was named in his honour in 1869.

== Gallery ==
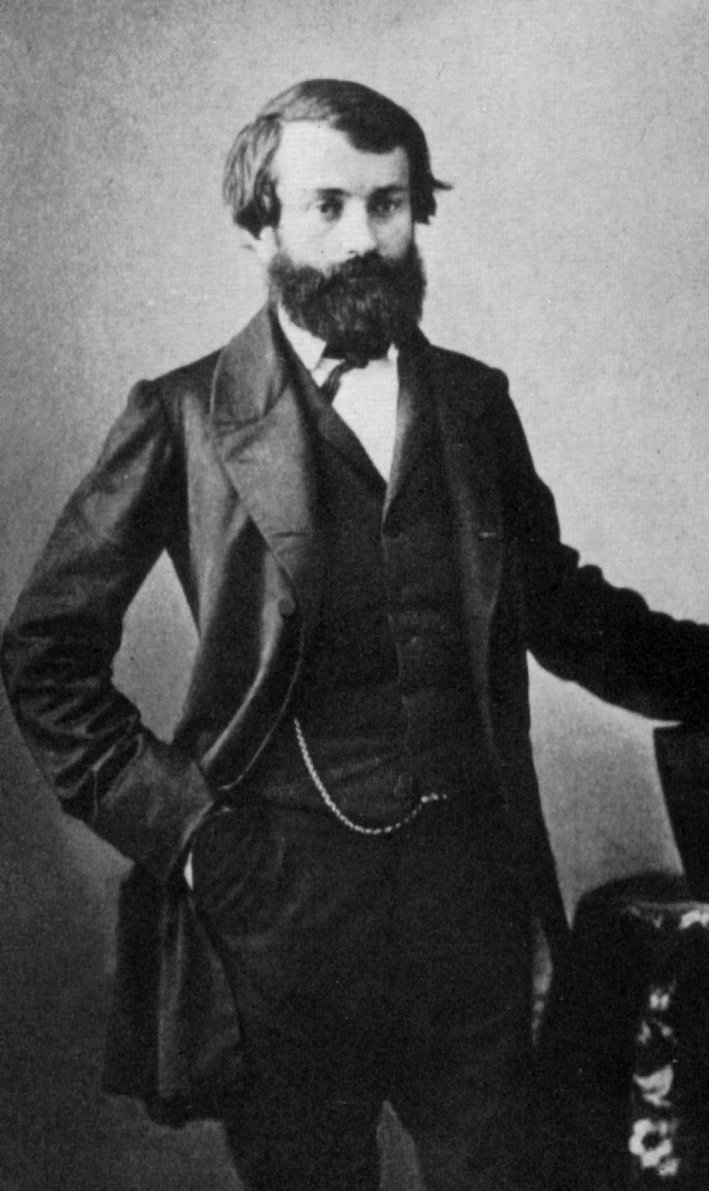
Quintino Sella in the early 1860s.

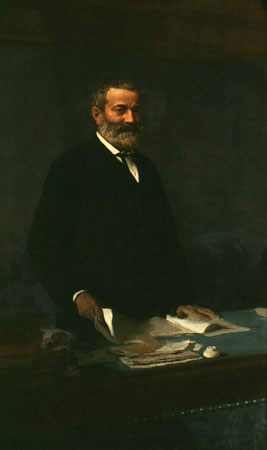
Quintino Sella in an official portrait.

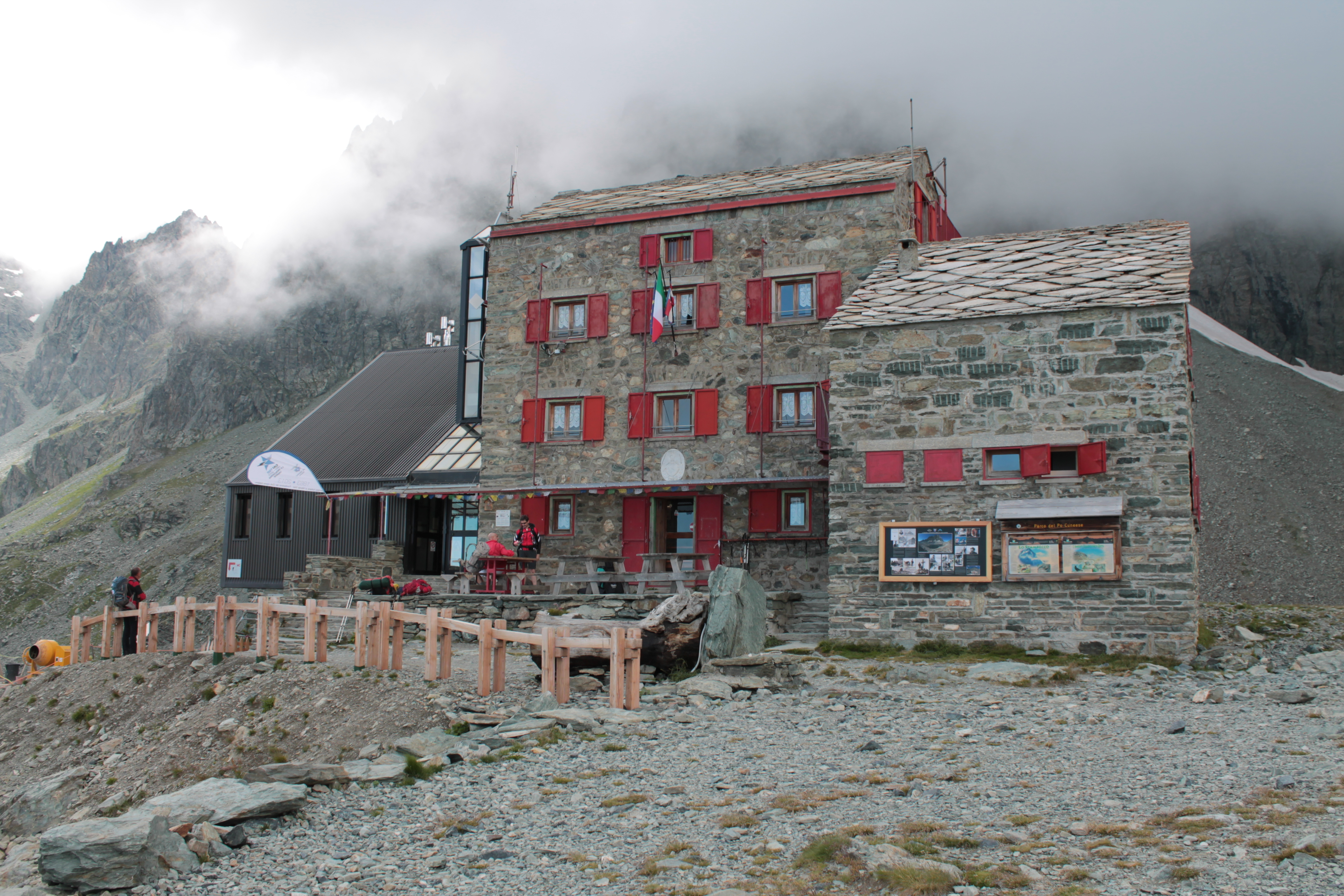
A Monte Viso's mountain hut was named in honour to him.

== See also ==
- Quintino Sella Hut (Mont Blanc)
- Refuge Quintino Sella au Félik
