= Giuseppe Natoli =

Italian jurist and politician

Giuseppe Natoli Gongora di Scaliti
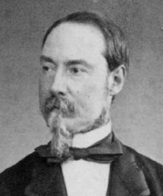

Minister of Agriculture

Minister of Education

Acting Minister of Interior Affairs

Personal details
- Born: 9 June 1815 Messina, Sicily
- Died: 25 September 1867 (aged 52) Messina, Kingdom of Italy
- Party: Historical Right

Giuseppe Natoli Gongora di Scaliti (9 June 1815 – 25 September 1867) was an Italian lawyer and politician from the Mediterranean island of Sicily. He was Minister of Agriculture under Camillo Benso, Count of Cavour, in the first government of the Kingdom of Italy after unification in 1861.

== Life ==
Natoli was born in Messina, in Sicily, on 9 June 1815, the son of Giacomo Natoli and Emanuela Cianciolo. He studied oratory and philosophy at the Accademia Carolina of Messina, and then studied law at the University of Palermo, where he graduated at the age of 22. From 1843 he taught at the University of Messina. He was offered a post as a judge, but declined it, not wishing to serve the Bourbon king. Natoli took part in the Sicilian Revolution of 1848, and as a result fled Sicily for Turin, where he spent eleven years in exile. In 1860 he was involved in organising Garibaldi's venture against Sicily, and embarked with the second wave of ships. Under the dictatorship of Garibaldi he was briefly minister for agriculture, and acting minister for foreign affairs.

After the unification of Italy in 1861, Camillo Benso, Count of Cavour, invited him to become minister for agriculture in the short-lived first government of the new Kingdom of Italy. Natoli was made a Senator of Italy and appointed prefetto ("governor") of Brescia, but was dismissed after troops opened fire on a crowd on 16 May 1862. He was then prefetto of Siena for about two weeks.

In 1864 Alfonso La Marmora made Natoli minister for education in his government. In 1865, following the resignation Giovanni Lanza, he was also interim minister for home affairs for a few months.

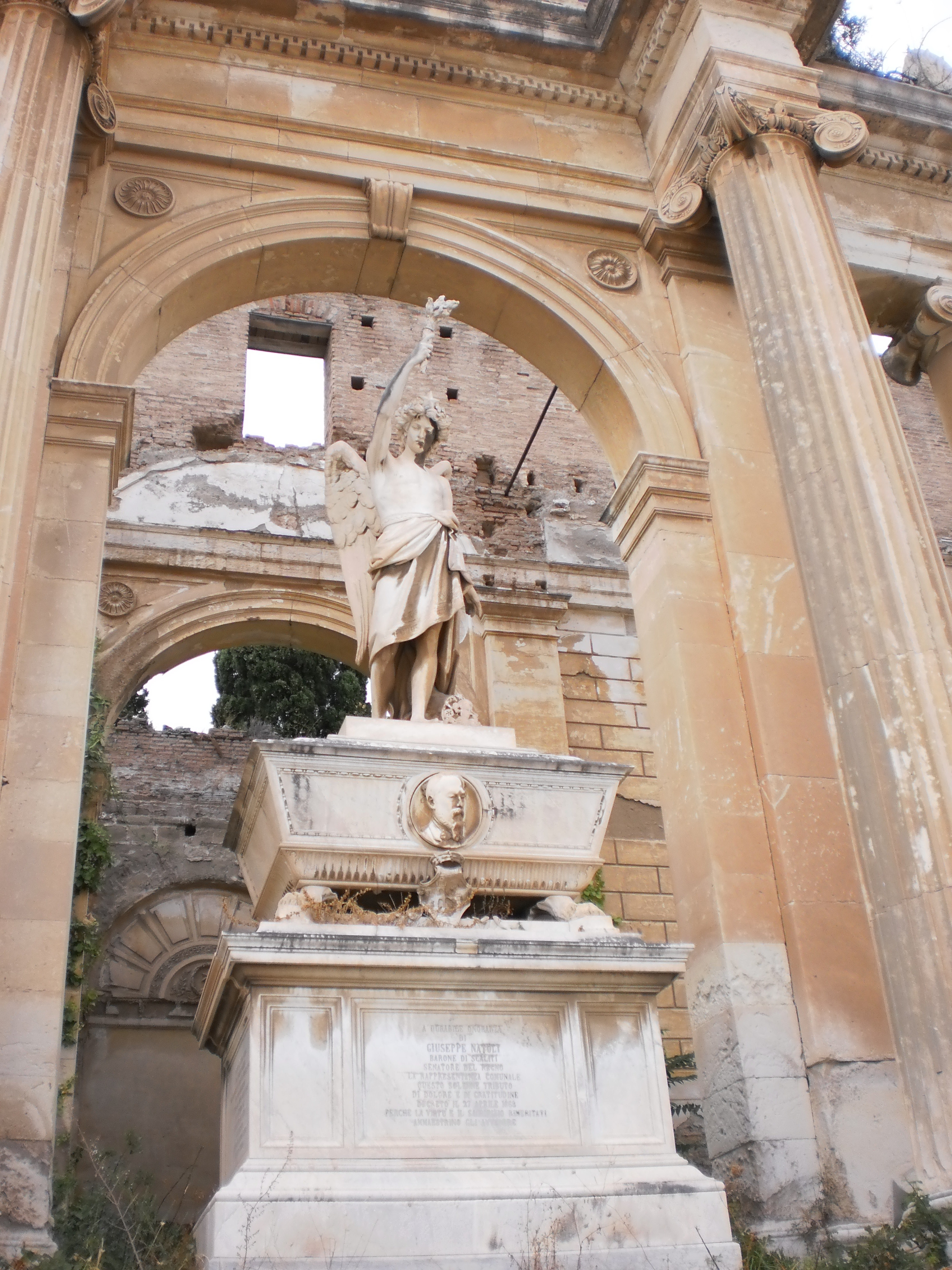
The monument to Natoli by Letterio Gangeri, in the Gran Camposanto di Messina

Natoli died on 25 September 1867 in the cholera epidemic in Messina. He was buried in the chapel of the Arciconfraternita degli Azzurri. On 6 July 1880 his remains were exhumed and moved to the Gran Camposanto di Messina, where Letterio Gangeri made a large monument to him.

Natoli was a Grand Officer of the Order of Saints Maurice and Lazarus, and an officer of the Order of San Marino.
