= Marco Minghetti =

Italian politician (1818–1886)

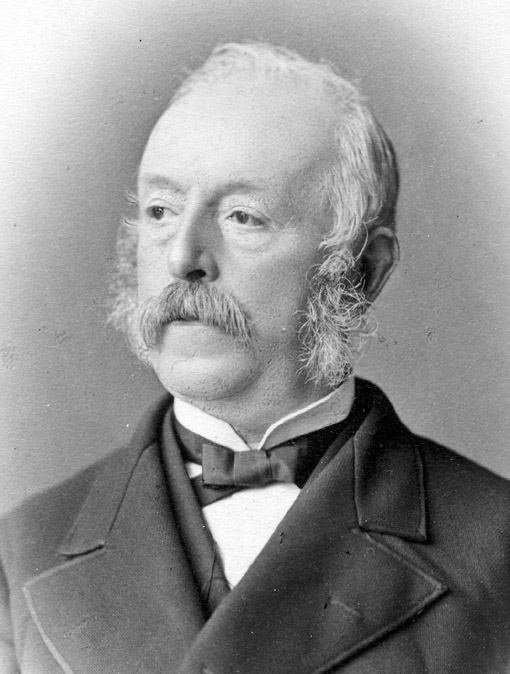

Prime Minister of Italy
- In office 10 July 1873 – 25 March 1876
- Monarch: Victor Emmanuel II
- Preceded by: Giovanni Lanza
- Succeeded by: Agostino Depretis
- In office 24 March 1863 – 28 September 1864
- Monarch: Victor Emmanuel II
- Preceded by: Luigi Carlo Farini
- Succeeded by: Alfonso Ferrero La Marmora

Personal details
- Born: 18 November 1818 Bologna, Papal States
- Died: 10 December 1886 (aged 68) Rome, Kingdom of Italy
- Party: Historical Right

Marco Minghetti (18 November 1818 – 10 December 1886) was an Italian economist and statesman.

== Biography ==
Minghetti was born in Bologna, then part of the Papal States.

With Antonio Montanan and Rodolfo Audinot he founded at Bologna a paper, Il Felsineo. He signed the petition to the Papal conclave, 1846, urging the election of a liberal pope, and was appointed member of the state council summoned to prepare a constitution for the Papal States. In the first constitutional cabinet of the Papal States, presided over by Cardinal Antonelli, Minghetti held the portfolio of public works, but after Pius IX publicly spoke against the Italian Risorgimento he resigned, and joined the Piedmontese army as captain on the general staff.

Returning to Rome in September 1848, he refused to join a papal ministry after the November 15 assassination of Pellegrino Rossi, and spent the next eight years in study and travel. In 1856, he was summoned to Paris by Cavour to help prepare a memorandum on the future status of the Romagna provinces for the negotiations occurring for the Paris congress resolving the Crimean War. In 1859, he was appointed by Cavour to become secretary-general of the Piedmontese Foreign Office. In the same year he was elected president of the assembly of the Romagna after the rejection of pontifical rule by those provinces, and prepared their annexation to Piedmont.

In October 1860 he was appointed Piedmontese minister of the interior, but he resigned office shortly after Cavour's death. In 1862, he was subsequently chosen to be minister of finance by prime minister Farini. In 1863, Minghetti succeeded Farini as prime minister, and held this position for 19 months. With the help of Emilio, marquis Visconti-Venosta, by September 15, 1864, he concluded the September Convention agreed to by France, whereby Napoleon III of France agreed to evacuate Rome, and the Savoy monarchy of Italy to transfer her capital from Turin to Florence. The convention excited violent opposition at Turin, causing Minghetti to resign. He took little part in public life until 1869, when he accepted the portfolio of agriculture in the Menabrea Cabinet.

Both in and out of office he exercised his influence against an Italo-French alliance and for an immediate advance upon Rome, and in 1870 was sent to London and Vienna by the Lanza-Sella Cabinet to organize a league of neutral powers on the outbreak of the Franco-Prussian War. In 1873 he overthrew the Lanza-Sella Cabinet and regained the premiership, which, with the portfolio of finance, he held until the fall of the Right from power on 18 March 1876.

During his premiership he inaugurated the rapprochement between Italy, Austria and Germany, and reformed the naval and military administration; and before his ouster he was able, as finance minister, to balance the State budget for the first time since 1860. After the advent of the Left, Minghetti remained for some years in opposition, but towards 1884 joined Depretis in creating the Trasformismo ("Transformation" movement), which united the various liberal factions in the country. He hoped to imitate the example of William Ewart Gladstone's Liberal Party. Minghetti, however, drew from it no personal advantage, and died at Rome on 10 December 1886 without having returned to power.

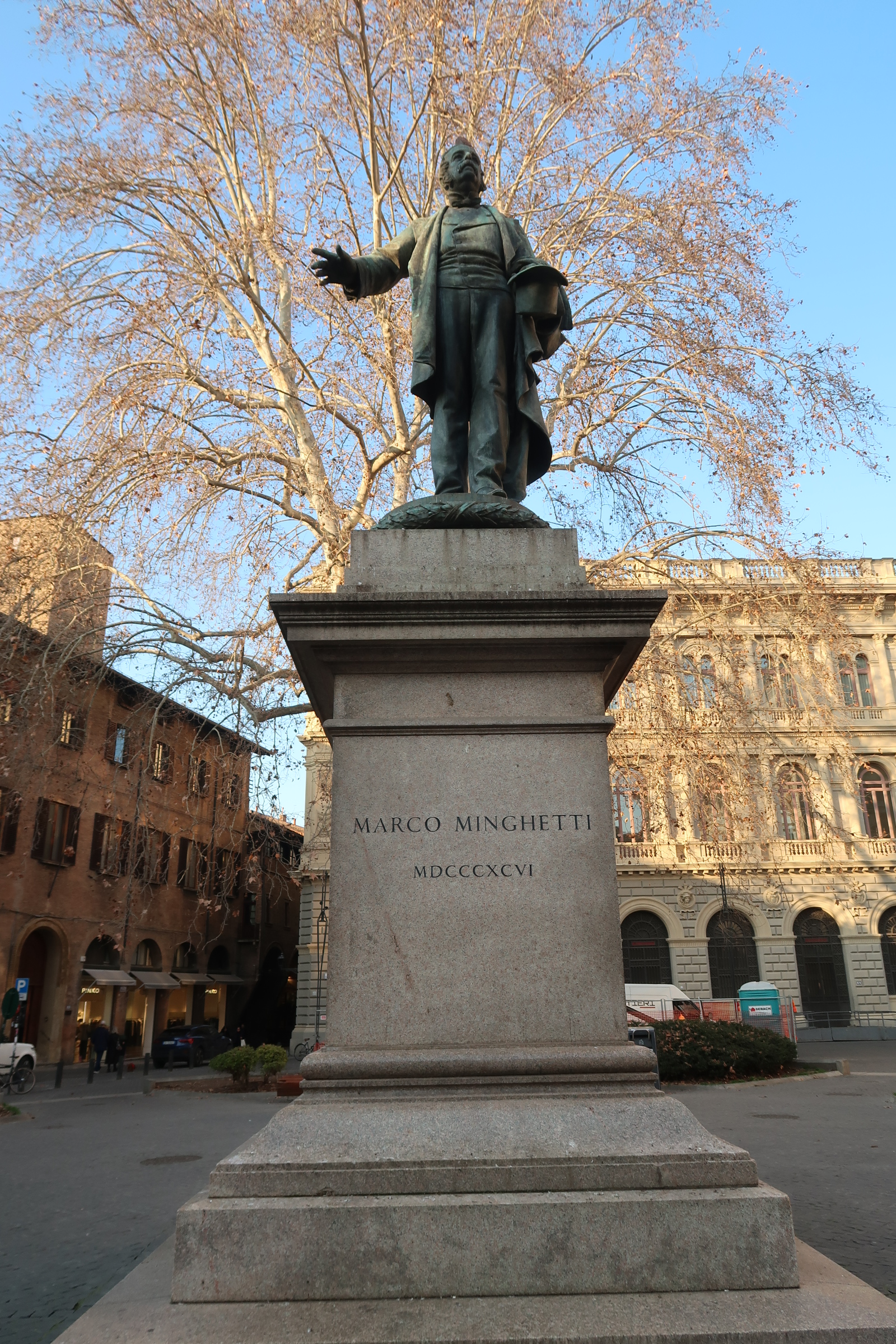
Bronze Statue (1896) of Marco Minghetti (1818-1886), Italian right-wing politician, in Piazza Minghetti, Bologna, Emilia-Romagna, Italy by sculptor Giulio Monteverde (1837-1917)

His writings include: Della economia pubblica e delle sue attinenze con la morale e col diritto (Bologna, 1859), and La Chiesa e lo Stato (Milan, 1878). He is commemorated in Rome by a monument at Piazza San Pantaleo on the Corso and in Bologna by a statue in the Piazza Minghetti.

== Writings ==
- I partiti politici e la ingerenza loro nella giustizia e nell' amministrazione
- Della economia pubblica: e delle sue attinenze colla morale e col. diritto
- Des rapports de l'économie publique avec la morale et le droit
- Stato e chiesa By Marco Minghetti
- L'état et l'église
- La convenzione di settembre: un capitolo dei miei ricordi
- Scritti vari

Political offices
Preceded by Urbano Rattazzi	Italian Minister of the Interior; 1860–1861	Succeeded by Bettino Ricasoli
Preceded by Quintino Sella	Italian Minister of Finance; 1862–1864	Succeeded by Quintino Sella
Preceded by Luigi Carlo Farini	Prime Minister of Italy; 1863–1864	Succeeded by Alfonso La Marmora
Preceded by Antonio Ciccone	Italian Minister of Commerce; 1869–1869	Succeeded by Stefano Castagnola
Preceded by Quintino Sella	Italian Minister of Finance; 1873–1876	Succeeded by Agostino Depretis
Preceded by Giovanni Lanza	Prime Minister of Italy; 1873–1876	Succeeded by Agostino Depretis

== See also ==
- Turin Massacre (1864)
