= Ubaldino Peruzzi =

Italian politician (1822–1891)

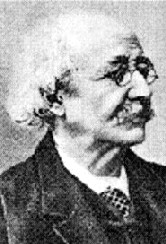
Ubaldino Peruzzi, c. 1863

Ubaldino Peruzzi (2 April 1822 – 9 September 1891) was an Italian politician of the Kingdom of Sardinia and the Kingdom of Italy. He was twice mayor of Florence and served as a member of the Provisional Government of Tuscany in 1859-60. He was a member of the Peruzzi family. His paternal grandmother was a member of the Medici family. He was a recipient of the Order of Saints Maurice and Lazarus.

== Bibliography ==
- AA. VV., La Provincia di Firenze e i suoi amministratori dal 1860 a oggi, Leo S. Olschki editore, Firenze 1996.
- P. Bagnoli (a cura di), Ubaldino Peruzzi. Un protagonista di Firenze capitale. Atti del Convegno (Firenze, 24-26 gennaio 1992), Impruneta (FI) 1994, pp. 312.

Preceded by Bettino Ricasoli	Gonfaloniere of Florence; 1848–1850	Succeeded by Carlo Torrigiani
Preceded by Stefano Jacini	Minister of Public Works of the Kingdom of Sardinia; 1861	Succeeded by Sardinia becomes part of Italy
Preceded by himself in Sardinia	Minister of Public Works of the Kingdom of Italy; 1861–1862	Succeeded by Agostino Depretis
Preceded by Urbano Rattazzi	Minister of the Interior of the Kingdom of Italy; 1862–1864	Succeeded by Giovanni Lanza
Preceded by Lorenzo Ginori Lisci	Mayor of Florence; 1871-1878	Succeeded by Tommaso Corsini
