= Ministry of Justice (Italy) =

Government ministry of Italy

- Ministero della Giustizia

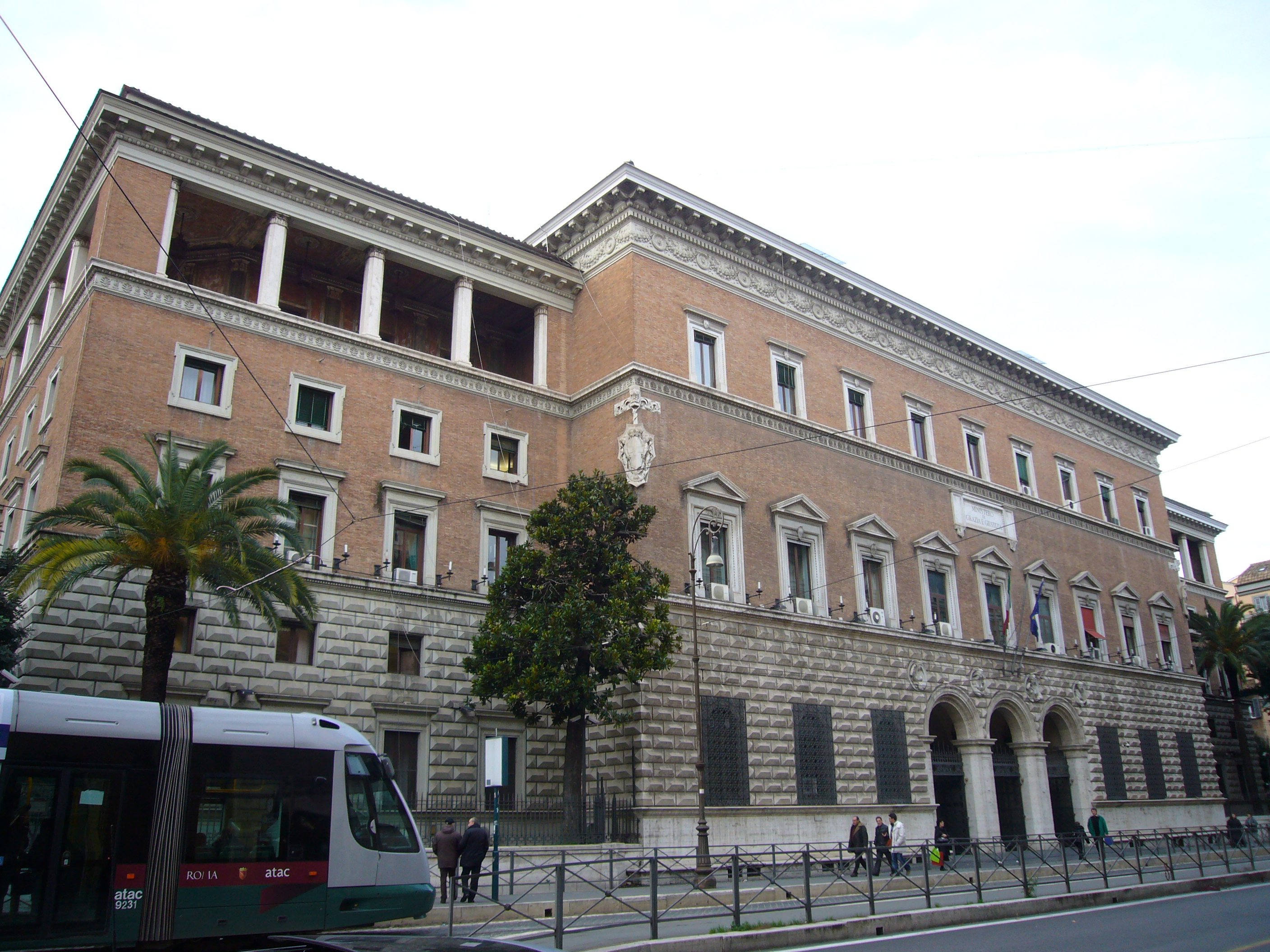

Agency overview
- Formed: 1861; 165 years ago
- Jurisdiction: Government of Italy
- Headquarters: Via Arenula, 70 Rome
- Website: www.giustizia.it

The Ministry of Justice of Italy (Italian: Ministero della Giustizia) is a department of the government of Italy. Headquartered in Rome, headed by the political official who serves as Minister of Justice.

== Background ==
In Italy, there is no strict equivalent of an Attorney General, and all comparisons risk being misleading, due to the differences in the constitutional and legal systems. As a result, the very approximate equivalent of a U.S. Attorney General would be the Ministro della Giustizia, who is a member of the government and head of the Italian Department of Justice. Also, the English Attorney General has no direct equivalent—as the function of legal adviser to the government does not exist as such, and part of its responsibilities are in the Avvocato Generale dello Stato, who is in charge of representing the State in any civil, criminal or administrative lawsuit, but not in charge of prosecution.

Prosecution in Italy enjoys constitutional independence from the Government, and is entrusted to a district attorney, the Procuratore della Repubblica (one for every ordinary court), the Procuratore Generale (every Court of Appeal), the Procuratore Distrettuale Antimafia, the Procuratore Generale (Court of Cassation) and the Procura Nazionale Antimafia.

The Italian Ministry of Justice is the ministerial department of the Judicial branch of the Italian government. The Ministry of Justice is the department in power in regards to the formulation of judicial policies. The department is led by the elected Minister of Justice. The Minister of Justice is a senior member of the cabinet. Currently, the position is held by former prosecutor Carlo Nordio.

The Ministry of Justice is led by two fundamental functions that are enumerated in the Italian Constitution: the organization of the services related to the judiciary and the responsibility to take disciplinary actions against a judge. All other functions are detailed through ordinary state laws. Article 110 of the Italian Constitution explicitly states that the organization and operation of services concerned with the administration of law are entrusted to the Minister of Justice. The minister is entrusted by the parliament as well as the council of ministers, to carry out the administration of correct governance as a means of checks and balances in the country. He also has the power of legislative initiative and the competence to create or remove judiciary.

The Ministry of Justice carries out its fundamental functions within the central structures, such as Rome, and in the judicial offices, tribunals, and courts. The judicial courts are composed of a chief magistrate and a court manager. The chief magistrate heads the judiciary and has the last say on judicial office decisions. The court manager serves as internal assistance to the judge and public prosecutors. The Italian judiciary is divided into three departments: inferior courts, intermediate appellate courts, and courts of last resort. The vertical and hierarchical structure of the courts of the judicial system is mitigated by the esteemed judges and prosecutors of the Superior Council of Magistrates.

== Divisions ==
- Polizia Penitenziaria

== See also ==
- List of ministers of justice (Italy)
