= Sebastiano Tecchio =

Italian politician (1807–1886)

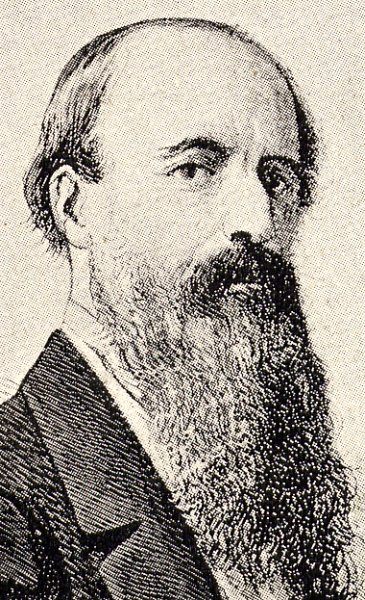
- Sebastiano Tecchio

President of the Senate of the Kingdom of Italy
- In office 1876–1884

Senator of the Kingdom of Italy
- In office 1866–1886

President of the Chamber of Deputies
- In office 22 March 1862 – 21 May 1863

Deputy of the Kingdom of Sardinia
- In office 1849–1859

Personal details
- Born: 3 January 1807 Vicenza, Kingdom of Lombardy–Venetia
- Died: 24 January 1886 (aged 79) Venice, Kingdom of Italy
- Education: University of Padua
- Occupation: Lawyer; politician

Sebastiano Tecchio (3 January 1807 – 24 January 1886), was an Italian lawyer and politician that was president of the Italian Senate from 1876 to 1884.

== Early life ==
Born in Vicenza, he graduated from the University of Padua in law.

He worked as a lawyer when Vicenza was part of the Kingdom of Lombardy–Venetia. In 1849, he fought against the Austrian Empire during the First Italian War of Independence and after the Battle of Novara, he was forced to leave his hometown to live in exile in the Kingdom of Sardinia where he was, for a brief time, a minister.

== Political career ==
From 1849 to 1859, he was elected to the Chamber of Deputies, the lower house of the Italian parliament. After the creation of the Kingdom of Italy, his political career continued, and he became president of the lower house of the parliament of the kingdom between 1862 and 1863. In 1866, after the Third Italian War of Independence, he was named senator by King Victor Emmanuel II. In the 1870s, he was also president of the appeal court of Venice, the highest judiciary body in the region of Veneto. In 1876, he was elected president of the Senate and was forced to resign from this post due to his strong support for the irredentismo.

== Death ==
He died in Venice in 1886.
