= Bettino Ricasoli =

Italian politician (1809–1880)

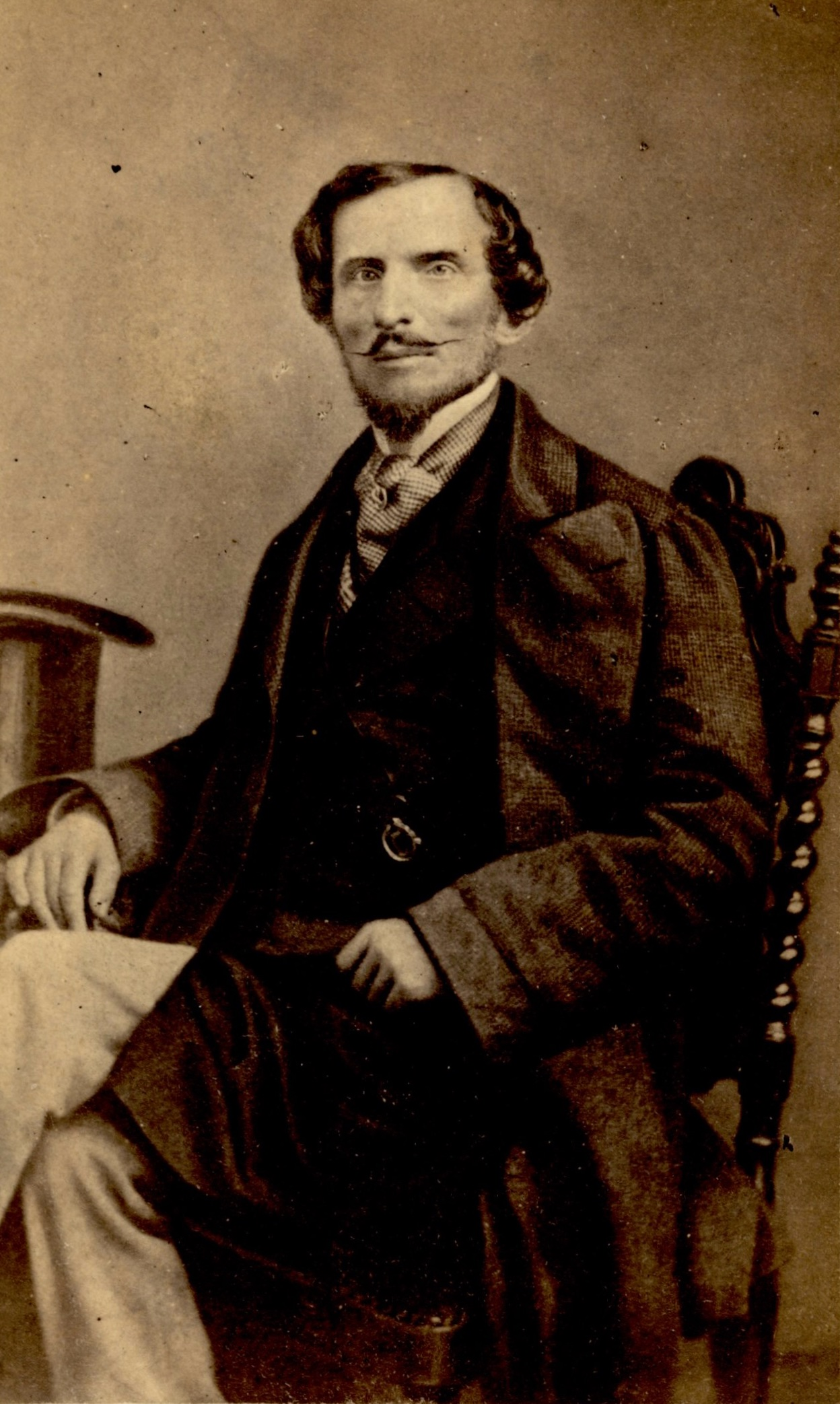
- Formal portrait c. 1860–1870

Prime Minister of Italy
- In office 20 June 1866 – 10 April 1867
- Monarch: Victor Emmanuel II
- Preceded by: Alfonso Ferrero La Marmora
- Succeeded by: Urbano Rattazzi
- In office 12 June 1861 – 3 March 1862
- Monarch: Victor Emmanuel II
- Preceded by: Count Cavour
- Succeeded by: Urbano Rattazzi

Member of the Italian Chamber of Deputies
- In office 18 February 1861 – 23 October 1880
- Constituency: Florence

Mayor of Florence
- In office 13 December 1847 – 16 November 1848
- Monarch: Leopold II
- Preceded by: Vincenzo Peruzzi
- Succeeded by: Ubaldino Peruzzi

Personal details
- Born: 9 March 1809 Florence, Arno, French Empire
- Died: 23 October 1880 (aged 71) Brolio Castle, Gaiole in Chianti, Kingdom of Italy
- Party: Historical Right
- Spouse: Anna Bonaccorsi
- Children: Elisabetta
- Profession: Landowner

Bettino Ricasoli, 1st Count of Brolio, 2nd Baron Ricasoli (Italian pronunciation: [betˈtiːno riˈkaːzoli]; 9 March 1809 – 23 October 1880) was an Italian statesman. He was a central figure in the politics of Italy during and after the unification of Italy. He led the Moderate Party.

== Biography ==
Ricasoli was born in Florence. Left an orphan at eighteen, with an estate heavily in debt, he was by special decree of the grand duke of Tuscany declared of age and entrusted with the guardianship of his younger brothers. He was Catholic.

Interrupting his studies, he withdrew to Brolio, and by careful management disencumbered the family possessions. In 1847 he founded the journal La Patria, and addressed to the grand duke a memorial suggesting remedies for the difficulties of the state. In 1848 he was elected Gonfaloniere of Florence, but resigned on account of the anti-Liberal tendencies of the grand duke.

As Tuscan minister of the interior in 1859 he promoted the union of Tuscany with Piedmont, which took place on March 12, 1860. Elected Italian deputy in 1861, he succeeded Cavour in the premiership. As premier he admitted the Garibaldian volunteers to the regular army, revoked the decree of exile against Mazzini, and attempted reconciliation with the Vatican; but his efforts were rendered ineffectual by the non possumus of the pope.

Disdainful of the intrigues of his rival Rattazzi, he found himself obliged in 1862 to resign office, but returned to power in 1866. On this occasion he refused Napoleon III's offer to cede Venetia to Italy, on condition that Italy should abandon the Prussian alliance, and also refused the Prussian decoration of the Black Eagle because La Marmora, author of the alliance, was not to receive it.

Upon the departure of the French troops from Rome at the end of 1866 he again attempted to conciliate the Vatican with a convention, in virtue of which Italy would have restored to the Church the property of the suppressed religious orders in return for the gradual payment of 24,000,000. In order to mollify the Vatican he conceded the exequatur to forty-five bishops inimical to the Italian régime. The Vatican accepted his proposal, but the Italian Chamber proved refractory, and, though dissolved by Ricasoli, returned more hostile than before. Without waiting for a vote, Ricasoli resigned office and thenceforward practically disappeared from political life, speaking in the Chamber only upon rare occasions. He died at his Castello di Brolio on 23 October 1880.

The barone created the modern recipe of Chianti wine; though a formula of specific grape percentages is often erroneously attributed to him, his switch in focus to Sangiovese as the lead grape in the blend would have lasting implications for both Tuscan and Italian wine. The family named firm (Ricasoli 1141) still produces wine at Brolio.

His private life and public career were marked by the utmost integrity, and by a rigid austerity which earned him the name of the Iron Baron. In spite of the failure of his ecclesiastical scheme, he remains one of the most noteworthy figures of the Italian Risorgimento.

== See also ==
- History of Chianti
- Tuscan Republic (1849)
- Provisional Government of Tuscany

Political offices
Preceded by Marco Minghetti	Italian Minister of the Interior; 1861–1862	Succeeded by Urbano Rattazzi
Preceded by Count Camillo Benso di Cavour	Prime Minister of Italy; 1861–1862	Succeeded by Urbano Rattazzi
Preceded by Count Camillo Benso di Cavour	Italian Minister of Foreign Affairs; 1861–1862	Succeeded by Urbano Rattazzi
Preceded by Alfonso Ferrero la Marmora	Prime Minister of Italy; 1866–1867	Succeeded by Urbano Rattazzi
Preceded by Desiderato Chiaves	Italian Minister of the Interior; 1866–1867	Succeeded by Urbano Rattazzi
