= Paolo Morrone =

Italian officer (1854–1937)

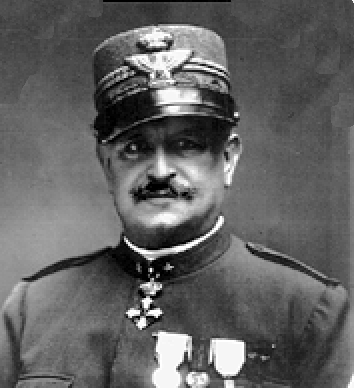

Minister of War
- In office 4 April 1916 – 18 June 1916
- Preceded by: Vittorio Italico Zupelli
- In office 18 June 1916 – 16 June 1917
- Succeeded by: Gaetano Giardino

Senator
- In office 15 May 1916 – 4 January 1937

Paolo Morrone (Torre Annunziata, 3 July 1854 – Rome, 4 January 1937) was an Italian general, politician and Minister of War in the second Salandra government and in the Boselli government. He was among the leading military figures of the First World War.

== Family ==
He was the son of Luigi Morrone and Maria Cirillo. He pursued his studies in his hometown and then in Naples. He married Anna Sironi with whom he had two sons, Giuseppe Antonio and Achille. He lived in Rome until his death in 1937.

== Military career ==
Having enlisted in the Royal Italian Army on 10 October 1871, he attended courses at the Military Academy of Modena. Appointed sub-lieutenant three years later he was assigned to the 26th Infantry Regiment. Subsequently, he attended the War School in 1884, ranking first in his class with infantry and cavalry weapons. On 26 September 1886 he was appointed captain of the General Staff and Chief of Staff of the Military Division of Ancona. He took part in the African campaign preceding the First Italo-Ethiopian War. He was promoted to Lieutenant Colonel on 8 July 1897, Colonel on 21 March 1901 and commander of the 37th Infantry Regiment, Major General on 23 January 1908 and appointed lieutenant General and commander of the Sicily Brigade on 31 December 1911.

Two months before the start of the Great War, he was tasked with forming the XIV Army Corps, at the head of which, at the beginning of hostilities, he was positioned on the Isonzo front at Monte San Michele. He managed to hold the position thanks to his skills as a tactical organizer and leader of rank and file soldiers, mostly from the south of Italy. In recognition of this King Vittorio Emanuele III appointed him Commander of the Military Order of Savoy. After the defeat at Caporetto he was placed in command of the new 9th Army. He was promoted to Army corps general on 22 July 1923.

== Political career ==
He was recommended for the post of Minister of War by Chief of Staff Luigi Cadorna and served from 4 April 1916 to 18 June 1916 during the Salandra II government, and from 18 June 1916 - 16 June 1917 in the Boselli government. At the same time he was appointed senator of the Kingdom of Italy on 15 May 1916.

Morrone liaised with Cadorna and articulated in cabinet his authoritarian approach to the war, sharing his suspicion about the 'home front' and issuing circulars that reflected the preoccupations of the supreme command towards 'defeatism’. Together with Morrone, the Minister of the Navy, Admiral Camillo Corsi, withdrew from the government in June 1917 following disagreements in cabinet about which minister was to be responsible for liaison with the Chief of Staff. They were replaced by General Gaetano Giardino, close to Cadorna, at the Ministry of War and by Vice Admiral Arturo Triangi at that of the Navy.

Soon after Morrone was appointed president of the Supreme Court of the Army and Navy, which he held from 21 October 1917 to 7 March 1918. Subsequently, he commanded the IX Army, held as a general reserve, without participating in the final battle of Vittorio Veneto. He held this command until February 1919. Placed at his request in a special auxiliary position in 1922, he was recalled to service the following year as and from 1 February 1923 held the rank of army general.

== Army reform ==
After the war, Morrone was one of the leading military figures involved in reform of the army. He was a member of the parliamentary commission for the reform of military legislation chaired by senator it:Agostino Berenini and in this capacity he promoted an article to the new military penal code which explicitly prohibited the use decimation as a punishment for serving soldiers, which had been practised under Cadorna.

At the end of 1920 he was one of a group of generals invited by Minister of War Ivanoe Bonomi to assist with reform of the high command. Morrone was among those who approved the new structure based on the French model of collegiate leadership that took effect in February 1921 with the resignation of Pietro Badoglio as chief of staff.

== Fascism ==
Morrone supported the accommodation between Mussolini and the armed forces. On 15 May 1929 he joined the National Fascist Party. As a senator he played a role in several commissions under Mussolini - he was a member of the finance commission (2 May 1929 – 16 December 1930), of the commission for the examination of the bill «Abolition of the age restriction for marriage for officers of the Royal Army» (5 June 1929) and of the instruction commission of the High Court of Justice (25 June - 17 December 1929), over which he presided from 27 December 1929 to 19 January 1934 and from 1 May 1934 to 4 January 1937.

== Positions and titles ==
He was a member of the Council of the Military Order of Savoy from 4 July 1918 to 9 January 1930 and was elected member of the Council for the Order of Saints Maurice and Lazarus and of the Crown of Italy on 6 February 1933.

== Honours ==
Gran cordone dell'Ordine della Corona d'Italia - ribbon for ordinary uniform

Grand cordon of the Order of the Crown of Italy
— 29 December 1916

Gran cordone dell'Ordine dei SS. Maurizio e Lazzaro - ribbon for ordinary uniform

Grand cordon of the Order of Saints Maurice and Lazarus
— 15 June 1917

Grande ufficiale dell'Ordine militare di Savoia - ribbon for ordinary uniform

Grand officer of the Military Order of Savoy
— 24 May 1919

Membro di III Classe dell'Ordine di Michele il Coraggioso (Romania) - ribbon for ordinary uniform

Member III Class of the Order of Michael the Brave (Romania)
— 29 September 1922
