= Leone Viale =

Italian admiral and politician

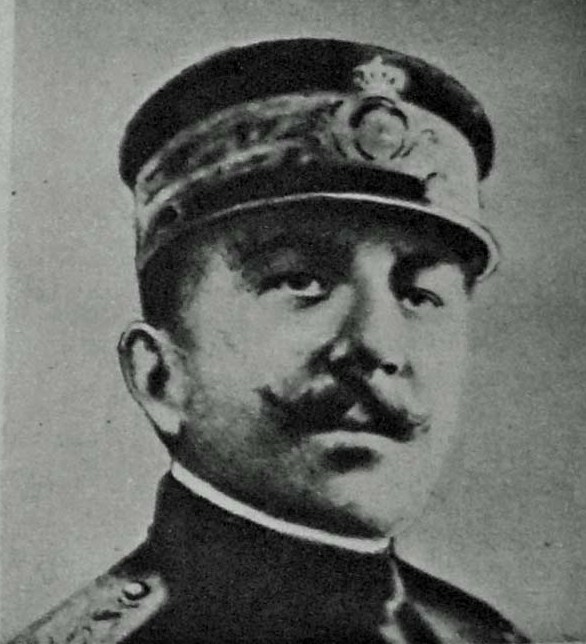

Senator
- In office 8 December 1913 – 2 February 1918

Minister of the Navy
- In office 14 August 1914 – 24 September 1915
- Preceded by: Enrico Millo
- Succeeded by: Camillo Corsi

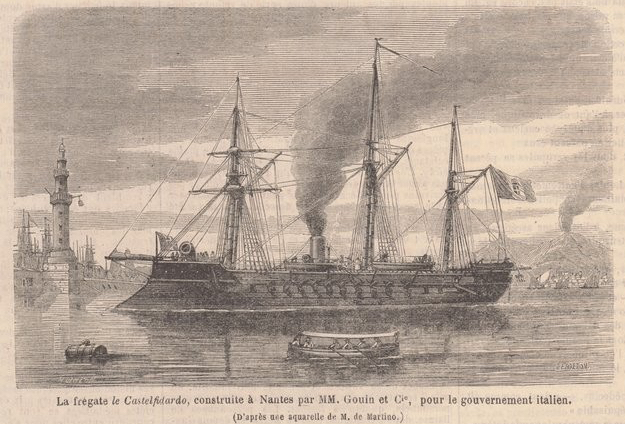
ironclad Castelfidardo

Leone Viale (Ventimiglia, 24 August 1851 – Genoa, 2 February 1918) was an Italian admiral and politician. He was Minister of the Navy of the Kingdom of Italy in the first and second Salandra governments at the time when Italy entered the First World War.

== Early life and career ==
Leone Viale was the son of Agostino Viale and Adelaide Leone. After the death of his father, his entire family left the town of his birth. He entered the Italian Naval Academy in Genoa on 1 December 1866, and graduated as an ensign on 26 February 1871. After a period of service on transport ships he was assigned to the paddleship corvette Governolo, which left Naples to carry out a naval campaign and scientific expedition to Borneo, Malaysia, the Philippines, China and Japan. It returned to La Spezia on 28 October 1874.

Promoted to sub-lieutenant in 1875 and lieutenant in June 1883, Viale was assigned to a number of roles relating to underwater weapons, serving at the San Bartolomeo torpedo works in La Spezia in 1879 and at the Artillery and Torpedo Directorate in 1883. He was sent to Newcastle to supervise the work on the weapons systems of the torpedo cruiser Giovanni Bausan.

He took part in the Italo-Ethiopian War of 1887–1889 and was then appointed orderly to the Duke of Genoa from 1 April 1886 to 1 November 1890, and was also promoted to frigate captain. Promoted to corvette captain on 1 August 1891, he was assigned as second officer of the cruisers Stromboli and Vesuvio, then of the cruiser Savoia. After a period on the ironclad Castelfidardo, he was placed in command of torpedo boat 135S and made squadron leader, a post he held until September 1897.

Twice deputy chief of staff on the Sicilia and Lepanto, Viale was later given command of the Umbria, with which he undertook a tour of Central and South America from 1901 to 1903 during which he was promoted to ship captain. The voyage aimed to represent Italian interests in the region, visiting Brazil, Argentina, Chile and Peru. Viale's role was particularly important in Callao where the Umbria’s crew distinguished itself by putting out the fire of the English transport Bakunin, loaded with oil drums.

== Later naval career ==
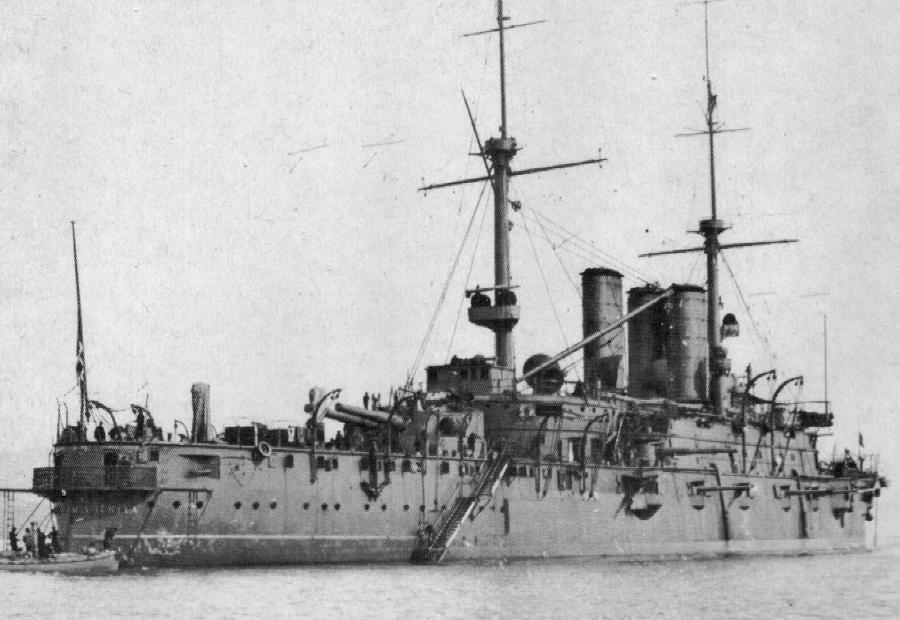
Italian battleship Regina Margherita

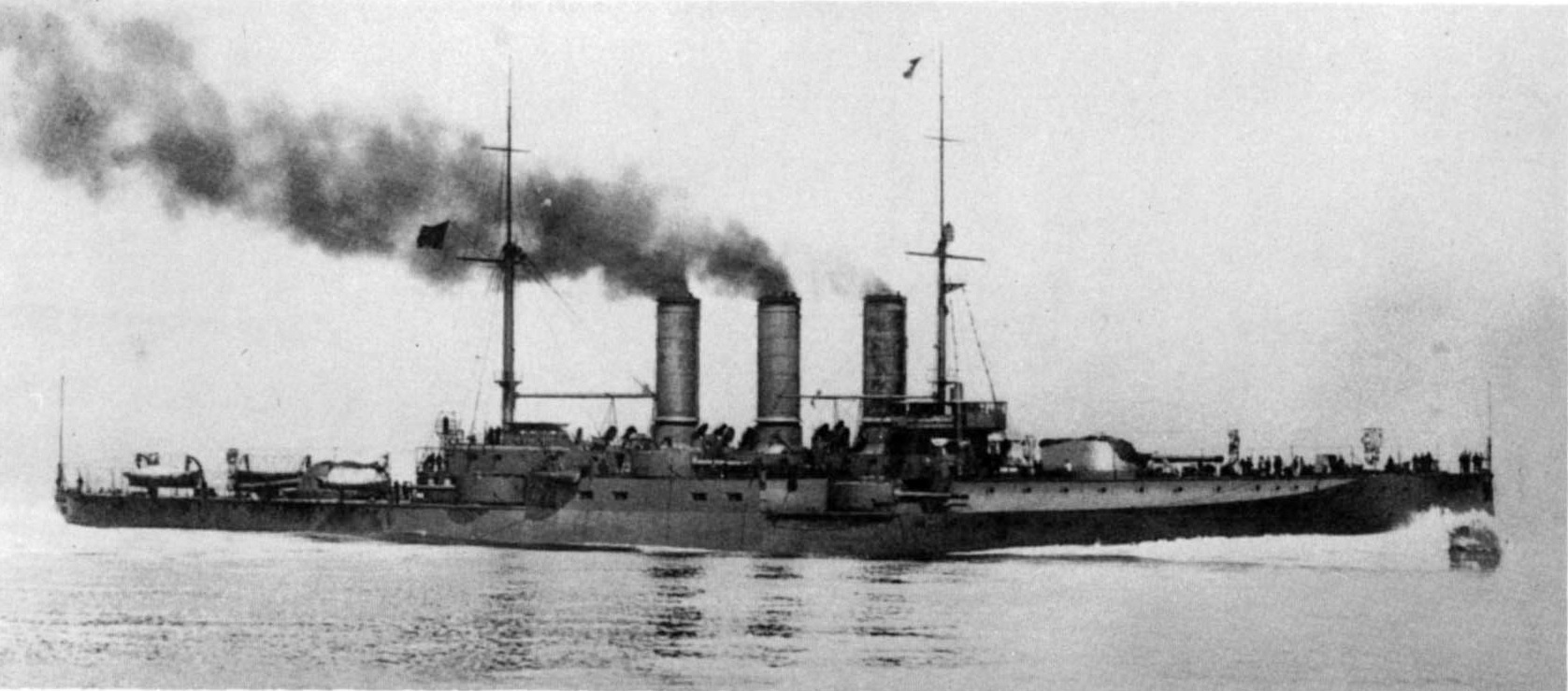
Italian battleship Regina Elena

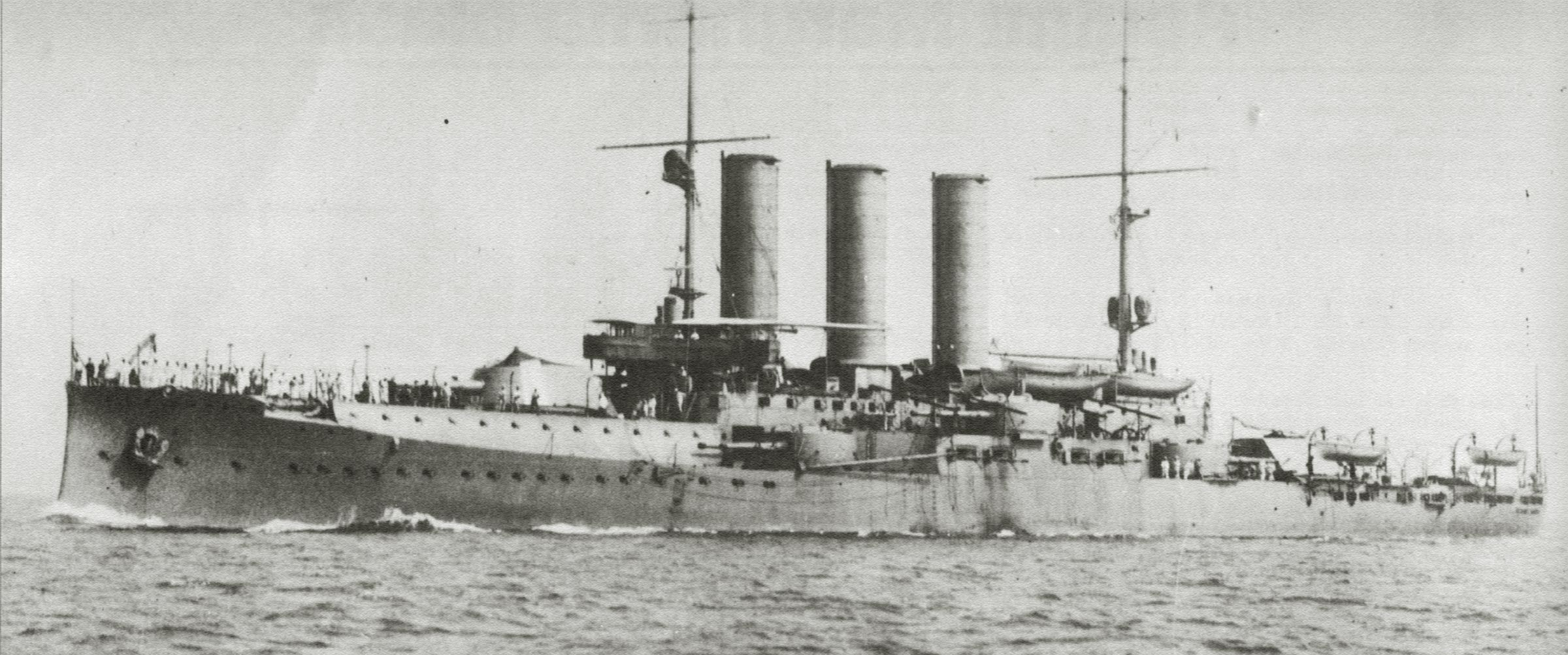
Italian battleship Vittorio Emanuele

From November 1903 to August 1904 Viale was commander of the battleship Regina Margherita. He was then appointed chief of staff of the first maritime department of La Spezia (1904), and then first aide-de-camp to the Duke of Genoa. In February 1906, promoted to rear admiral, he was appointed senior commander of the Royal Crew Corps (1906–07).

For the next few years he continued to discharge both administrative and operational roles. He was general director of the Military and Scientific Service at the Ministry of the Navy (March 1907-October 1908, January 1910-January 1911) and commander-in-chief of the 1st Maritime Department and of the naval division of La Spezia (March–September 1911). During this period he also commanded the battleship Regina Elena (November 1908-October 1909), providing aid to the people affected by the 1908 Messina earthquake, for which he obtained a gold medal.

Promoted to vice admiral on 16 February 1911, he was appointed president of the Superior Council of the Navy (October 1911-March 1912). Soon after the outbreak of the Libyan war he was appointed commander-in-chief of the 2nd squadron, with the Regina Margherita as his flagship, and the following April he was made commander-in-chief of the naval forces, moving his flag the battleship Vittorio Emanuele. On 3 June 1912 he was designated Commander-in-Chief of the Combined Naval Forces, and he directed the landing operations and occupation of the Dodecanese Islands (26 April–13 May 1912). He also pushed the government to force the Dardanelles, an operation which was actually carried out on 18 July 1912 by five torpedo boats led by Enrico Millo.

On 1 November 1913, after the war ended, he returned to command of the Maritime Department of La Spezia, where he remained in service until 7 May 1914, then once again presiding over the Superior Council of the Navy.

== Political career ==
Viale became a Senator of the Kingdom of Italy in December 1913, qualifying after having served as admiral for more than five years.

On 14 August 1914 Viale was appointed Minister of the Navy in the First Salandra cabinet, a position he held until 24 September 1915, during the Second Salandra government. While Italy was still neutral in World War I, Viale participated in the negotiations for the Anglo-French-Italian naval convention, covering cooperation in naval operations in the Adriatic Sea and the Mediterranean Sea. On the eve of Italy's entry into the war, Navy Chief of Staff Vice Admiral Paolo Thaon di Revel wanted to begin operations before the declaration of war, but he was prevented by Viale and Salandra.

As minister Viale continued the construction of the large Francesco Caracciolo-class battleships, but he also planned to dedicate more resources to destroyers and submarines, in line with the wishes of Thaon di Revel. He did not, however, purchase Argentina’s two Rivadavia-class battleships, recently completed in the United States, as Thaon Di Revel suggested.

Italy's entered World War I on the side of the Allies by declaring war on Austria-Hungary on 23 May 1915. The Italian mobilization in the summer of 1915 was hampered by lack of preparation on almost every front. Not only did the navy lack ships and equipment, but logistics and supplies were insufficient. The government relied on the Red Cross to provide hospitals for wounded seamen, but Viale realised that they did not have enough beds to treat those returning from action. In Apulia he therefore ordered the requisitioning of school and church buildings in Lecce, together with beds, linens, and furniture to make up the shortfall. When it became clear that there were not enough doctors to staff these establishments, he advertised for unskilled volunteers to take on the work.

When Italy entered the war on the side of the Triple Entente, the navy performed very poorly in the first few months. Italy lacked the forces and equipment to go on the offensive and launch a major attack on Austria-Hungary across the Adriatic Sea despite efforts by the United Kingdom and France to push Italy into joining Montenegro in an attack on Cattaro. Viale and Thaon di Revel generally agreed on the need for Italy to conserve its forces, avoid unnecessary risks, and concentrate on defending coastal towns from Austro-Hungarian Navy bombardment. This caution was only reinforced by the losses of the armored cruiser Amalfi and the submarine Medusa to Austro-Hungarian submarines.

Amid this uncertainty and lack of capacity, outright disorder prevailed at the highest levels. Navy Chief of Staff Thaon di Revel, based in Rome, issued orders contradicting those of the fleet commander-in-chief, the Duke of Abruzzi. In Viale's view Thaon di Revel was exceeding his powers, and he wrote to Salandra proposing that they be reduced. The disputes between the two men made the effective working of the navy impossible and eventually Viale decided to resign, citing his poor health and need for surgery.

He returned to active naval service, returning to his former role as commander of the Maritime Department of La Spezia from 16 December 1915 to 30 June 1916, after which he retired due to age was placed on the reserve list. On 6 September 1916, when he left active service, King Vittorio Emanuele III awarded him the title of count.

== Honours ==
Grand Cordon of the Order of Saints Maurice and Lazarus - ribbon for ordinary uniform

Grand Cordon of the Order of Saints Maurice and Lazarus

Grand Cordon of the Order of the Crown of Italy - ribbon for ordinary uniform

Grand Cordon of the Order of the Crown of Italy

Grand Officer of the Military Order of Savoy - ribbon for ordinary uniform

Grand Officer of the Military Order of Savoy
— 16 March 1911

Officer of the Order of Saint Michael (Kingdom of Bavaria) - ribbon for ordinary uniform

Officer of the Order of Saint Michael (Kingdom of Bavaria)

Knight of the Albert Order (Kingdom of Saxony) - ribbon for ordinary uniform

Knight of the Albert Order (Kingdom of Saxony)
