= Boselli government =

51st government of Kingdom of Italy

- 51st Cabinet of Italy

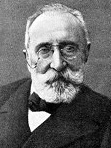
- Date formed: 18 June 1916
- Date dissolved: 30 October 1917

People and organisations
- Head of state: Victor Emmanuel III
- Head of government: Paolo Boselli
- Total no. of members: 16
- Member party: PL, PRI, UECI, PSRI
- Status in legislature: National unity government

History
- Predecessor: Second Salandra government
- Successor: Orlando government

The Boselli government of the Kingdom of Italy held office from 18 June 1916 until 30 October 1917, a total of 499 days, or 1 year, 4 months, and 12 days. It was a national unity government, composed of the Liberal Party (PL), the Italian Radical Party (PRI), the Italian Catholic Electoral Union (UECI), and the Italian Reformist Socialist Party (PSI), that dealt with World War I following the Italian entry into World War I in 1915 and the early spread of the Spanish flu that officially became pandemic in 1918. As the Italian Socialist Party (PSI) had largely remained at the opposition and only at times gave external support at most, the Boselli government was notable for the first participation of part of the socialists through the PSRI.

== Government parties ==
Party	Ideology	Leader
Liberals	Liberalism	Giovanni Giolitti
Italian Radical Party	Radicalism	Ettore Sacchi
Italian Catholic Electoral Union	Christian democracy	Ottorino Gentiloni
Italian Reformist Socialist Party	Social democracy	Leonida Bissolati

== Composition ==
Office	Name	Party	Term
Prime Minister	Paolo Boselli	Liberal	(1916–1917)
Minister of the Interior	Vittorio Emanuele Orlando	Liberal	(1916–1917)
Minister of Foreign Affairs	Sidney Sonnino	Liberal	(1916–1917)
Minister of Grace and Justice	Ettore Sacchi	Radical	(1916–1917)
Minister of Finance	Filippo Meda	Catholic Union	(1916–1917)
Minister of Treasury	Paolo Carcano	Liberal	(1916–1917)
Minister of War	Paolo Morrone	Military	(1916–1917)
Minister of War	Gaetano Giardino	Military	(1917–1917)
Minister of the Navy	Camillo Corsi	Military	(1916–1917)
Minister of the Navy	Arturo Triangi di Maderno e Laces	Military	(1917–1917)
Minister of the Navy	Alberto del Bono	Military	(1917–1917)
Minister of Industry and Commerce	Giuseppe De Nava	Liberal	(1916–1917)
Minister of Public Works	Ivanoe Bonomi	Reformist Socialist	(1916–1917)
Minister of Maritime and Rails Transport	Enrico Arlotta	Liberal	(1916–1917)
Minister of Maritime and Rails Transport	Ivanoe Bonomi	Reformist Socialist	(1917–1917)
Minister of Maritime and Rails Transport	Riccardo Bianchi	Independent	(1917–1917)
Minister of Agriculture	Giovanni Raineri	Liberal	(1916–1917)
Minister of Public Education	Francesco Ruffini	Independent	(1916–1917)
Minister of the Colonies	Gaspare Colosimo	Liberal	(1916–1917)
Minister of Post and Telegraphs	Luigi Fera	Independent	(1916–1917)
Minister for Weapons and Ammunitions	Alfredo Dallolio	Military	(1917–1917)
Minister of Military Assistance and War Pensions	Leonida Bissolati	Reformist Socialist	(1916–1917)
