= Giuseppe Sirianni =

Italian admiral and minister of the navy (1874-1955)

Admiral of the Fleet Giuseppe Sirianni
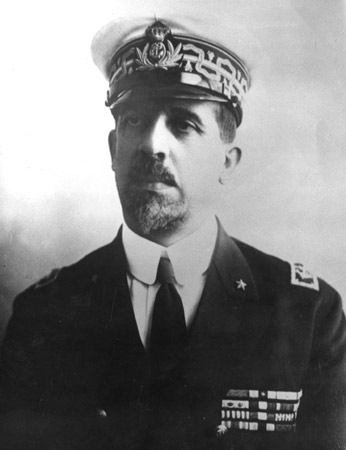
- Born: 18 April 1874; Genoa, Kingdom of Italy
- Died: 13 August 1955 (aged 81); Pieve Ligure, Italy
- Political party: National Fascist Party
- Military career
- Allegiance: Kingdom of Italy
- Branch: Regia Marina
- Service years: 1900–1935
- Rank: Admiral of the Fleet
- Commands: Perseo (torpedo boat); Impetuoso (destroyer); Nino Bixio (scout cruiser); Navy Regiment
- Conflicts: Boxer War; Italo-Turkish War; World War I; Adriatic Campaign; Italian Front; Second Battle of the Piave River; Battle of Vittorio Veneto
- Awards: Silver Medal of Military Valor (two awards); War Merit Cross (three awards); Commemorative Medal for the Italo-Turkish War 1911–1912; Military Order of Savoy; Order of the Crown of Italy; Order of Saints Maurice and Lazarus

Minister of the Navy of Italy
- In office 12 September 1929 – 1 January 1933
- Monarch: Victor Emmanuel III
- Prime Minister: Benito Mussolini
- Preceded by: Benito Mussolini
- Succeeded by: Benito Mussolini

Giuseppe Sirianni (18 April 1874 – 13 August 1955) was an Italian admiral, minister of the navy from 12 September 1929 to 6 November 1933; as such, he was one of the key figures of the Regia Marina during the interwar period and the Fascist regime. He was also a member of the Senate of the Kingdom of Italy from 1926 to 1929.

== Biography ==
Born in Genoa, after graduating from the Livorno Naval Academy he was sent to China in 1900 as a lieutenant in the naval infantry of the Regia Marina, participating in the suppression of the Boxer Rebellion. He participated in the Italo-Turkish War as commander of the torpedo boat Perseo, participating in Enrico Millo's raid on the Dardanelles in 1912 and being promoted to capitano di corvetta (corvette captain) for war merit. During World War I he was in command of the destroyer Impetuoso and later, with the rank of capitano di fregata (frigate captain), of the scout cruiser Nino Bixio. In June 1918 he commanded the Naval Infantry Regiment during the Second Battle of the Piave River. Altogether, he received two Silver Medals for Military Valor and three War Merit Crosses for his wartime service; for his role in the Battle of Vittorio Veneto he was promoted to capitano di vascello (ship-of-the-line captain) and made an Officer of the Military Order of Savoy.

From April to June 1920 he was president of the Naval Tribunal of La Spezia; from 1 December 1923 to 3 March 1925 he served as Commander of the Mechanic's School of Venice and from 6 March to 9 May 1925 he was Secretary of the Superior Council of the Navy. A friend of Costanzo Ciano, he was promoted to rear admiral in March 1925, and on 14 May 1925 he was appointed Undersecretary of the Ministry of the Navy in the Mussolini Cabinet, serving as de facto Minister of the Navy (the titular minister being Mussolini himself). Having joined the National Fascist Party, he became Senator of the Kingdom of Italy on 24 May 1926, and Minister of the Navy on 12 September 1929, with the rank of admiral, holding the position until 5 November 1933. Shortly afterwards he was appointed president of the Cogne steel mill company, and retired from political life in 1935. On 29 January 1940 he was promoted to admiral of the fleet.

In August 1945, after the end of the Second World War, he was referred to the High Court of Justice for Sanctions against Fascism as a senator appointed during the Fascist regime, but the request for conviction was rejected. He died in Pieve Ligure in 1955.

== Honors and awards ==
- Silver Medal of Military Valor
- War Merit Cross (three awards)
- Commemorative Medal of the Campaign in China
- Commemorative Medal for the Italo-Turkish War 1911–1912
- Commemorative Medal for the Italo-Austrian War 1915–1918
- Commemorative Medal of the Unity of Italy 1848–1918
- Allied Victory Medal
- Officer of the Military Order of Savoy
