= Dall'Olio =

Dall'Olio or Dallolio is an Italian surname. Notable people of this name include the following:

- Alfredo Dallolio (1853–1952), Italian general and politician
- Franca Dall'Olio (born 1945), Italian beauty queen, model and politician
- Francesco Dall'Olio (born 1953), Italian volleyball player
- Nelio Dallolio, American football coach

== See also ==
- Lawrence Dallaglio
- Dall'Oglio
- Dell'Olio
