= Alberto del Bono (1856–1932) =

Italian admiral and politician

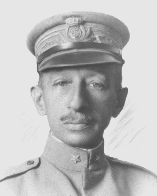

Minister of the Navy
- In office 16 July 1917 – 30 October 1917
- Preceded by: Arturo Triangi di Maderno e Laces
- In office 30 October 1917 – 23 June 1919
- Succeeded by: Giovanni Sechi

Senator
- In office 26 October 1917 – 26 July 1932

Alberto del Bono (Parma, 21 September 1856 – Rome, 26 July 1932) was an Italian admiral and politician.

== Naval career ==
He attended the naval schools of Naples and Genoa. Graduating in 1873 he entered the navy and was promoted on multiple occasions. Commander of the cruiser Ettore Fieramosca from 18 December 1906 to 13 April 1908, he then assumed command of the battleship Regina Elena on 21 September 1908. In December of that year he distinguished himself in the relief efforts following the Messina earthquake, and around this time became acquainted with Umberto Cagni, commander of the battleship Napoli and Paolo Thaon di Revel, commander of the Vittorio Emanuele.

Promoted rear admiral on 19 February 1911, he was a member of the Superior Navy Council from 16 March to 6 September 1911. He was then appointed commander of the Royal Naval Academy of Livorno on 6 September 1911, a position he held until 14 April 1914 during which he took part in the invasion of Libya with the naval training division composed of the cruisers Flavio Gioia (his flagship), Amerigo Vespucci and Etna.

== Political career ==
Promoted vice admiral in 1914, he was vice-president of the Superior Council of the Navy from 14 April 1914 to 11 January 1915 and commander in chief of the Upper Tyrrhenian Sea (La Spezia) since 1914, then general secretary of the Ministry of the Navy. He served as Minister of the Navy in the Boselli and Orlando governments and was appointed senator of the Kingdom of Italy.

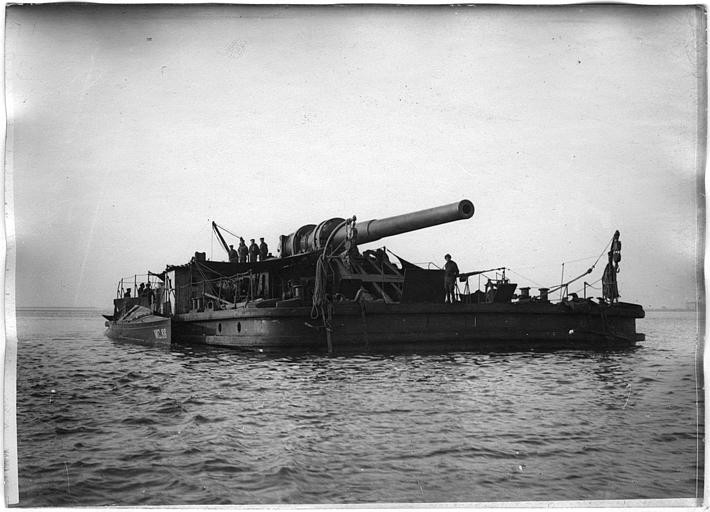
Artillery pontoon in the lagoon of Venice

After the defeat of Caporetto and the advance of Austrian troops to the Piave, Del Bono urged the Supreme Command and Prime Minister Orlando not to abandon Venice, but at the same time he worked with Paolo Thaon Di Revel to prepare a plan for large-scale flooding of the areas between the Adige and the Brenta and construct a defensive line on the right of the Po. At the end of 1917, a marine regiment and a marine artillery group were established while armed pontoons, light vessels and reconnaissance seaplanes were massed on the lower Piave and in the lagoon of Venice.

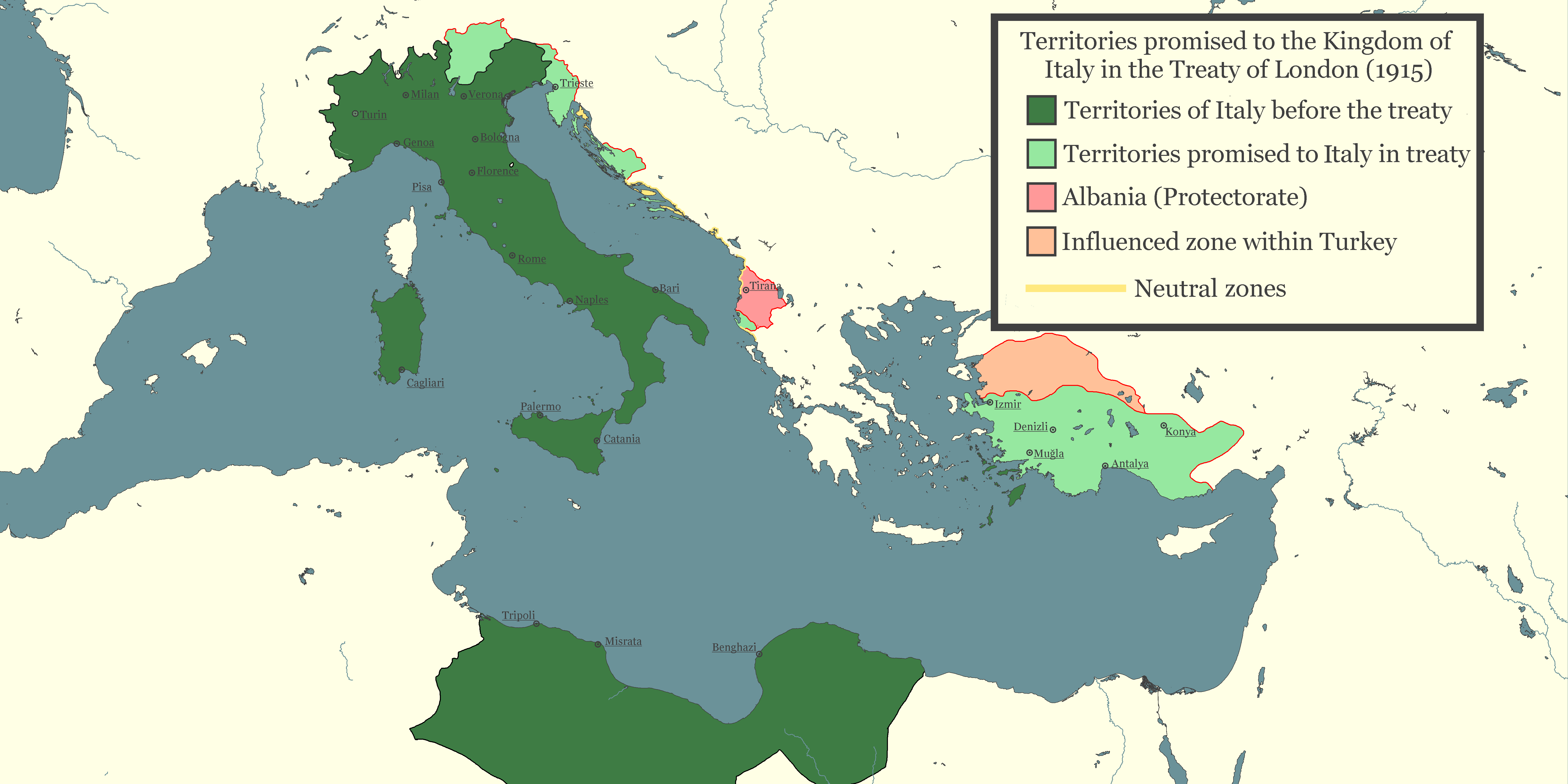
Territories promised to Italy in the treaty of London

As minister Del Bono was also involved in the political and military decisions that determined the borders and power relations in the eastern Mediterranean. He was suspicious of French backing for the new Kingdom of Yugoslavia, convinced that France’ project to establish a base at Fiume was intended to push Italy out of the upper Adriatic.

Del Bono was also at odds with both France and Britain over Italy's role in the peace settlement with the Ottoman Empire. In the Treaty of London (1915) and in the Agreement of Saint-Jean-de-Maurienne London and Paris had agreed that Italy should occupy extensive territories in Anatolia following the Ottoman defeat. However in the event Britain and France were determined mainly to se use their own advantage in the region, and supported the Greek Occupation of Smyrna. Foreign Minister Sidney Sonnino urged del Bono to send Italian warships into the Aegean Sea, but the British and French manoeuvred to keep Italy out of an active role, and the Italian crews in Rhodes were debilitated by the Spanish flu.

During his period in office Italy had to manage the reconstitution of its merchant marine, 57.5% of which had been sunk in the First World War with the loss of many trained and experienced seamen. Del Bono's solution was to bring all the nautical technical schools under the control of his ministry.

In the postwar debates about the future size and profile of the Italian navy, Del Bono supported building more battleships and declared his intention to complete the construction of the Caracciolo, though he did not give much consideration to the future role of aircraft carriers and naval aviation.

== Later life ==
From 1919 to 1921 he was commander of the Lower Tyrrhenian Sea (Naples) and president of the Superior Council of the Navy; After leaving active service in 1921 he worked in the steel industry as manager of the Metallurgica Bresciana company (formerly Tempini) finally becoming president of Aero Espresso Italiana. Alberto del Bono died in Rome on July 26, 1932.

== Honours ==
Grand Cordon of the Order of Saints Maurice and Lazarus – ribbon for ordinary uniform

Grand Cordon of the Order of Saints Maurice and Lazarus

Grand Cordon of the Order of the Crown of Italy – ribbon for ordinary uniform

Grand Cordon of the Order of the Crown of Italy

Maurician medal – ribbon for ordinary uniform

Maurician medal

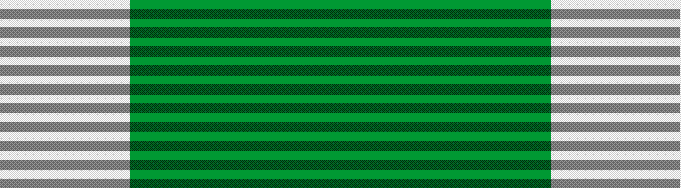
Gold Medal for the Calabrian-Sicilian earthquake – ribbon for ordinary uniform

Gold Medal for the Calabrian-Sicilian earthquake

Navy Distinguished Service Medal (United States) – ribbon for ordinary uniform

Navy Distinguished Service Medal (United States)
"The President of the United States takes pleasure in presenting the Navy Distinguished Service Medal to Alberto del Bono, Vice Admiral, Italian Navy, for exceptionally meritorious and distinguished service in a position of great responsibility to the Government of the United States, as member of an Allied Force during World War I."
