= Orlando government =

52nd Government of Kingdom of Italy

- 52nd Cabinet of Italy

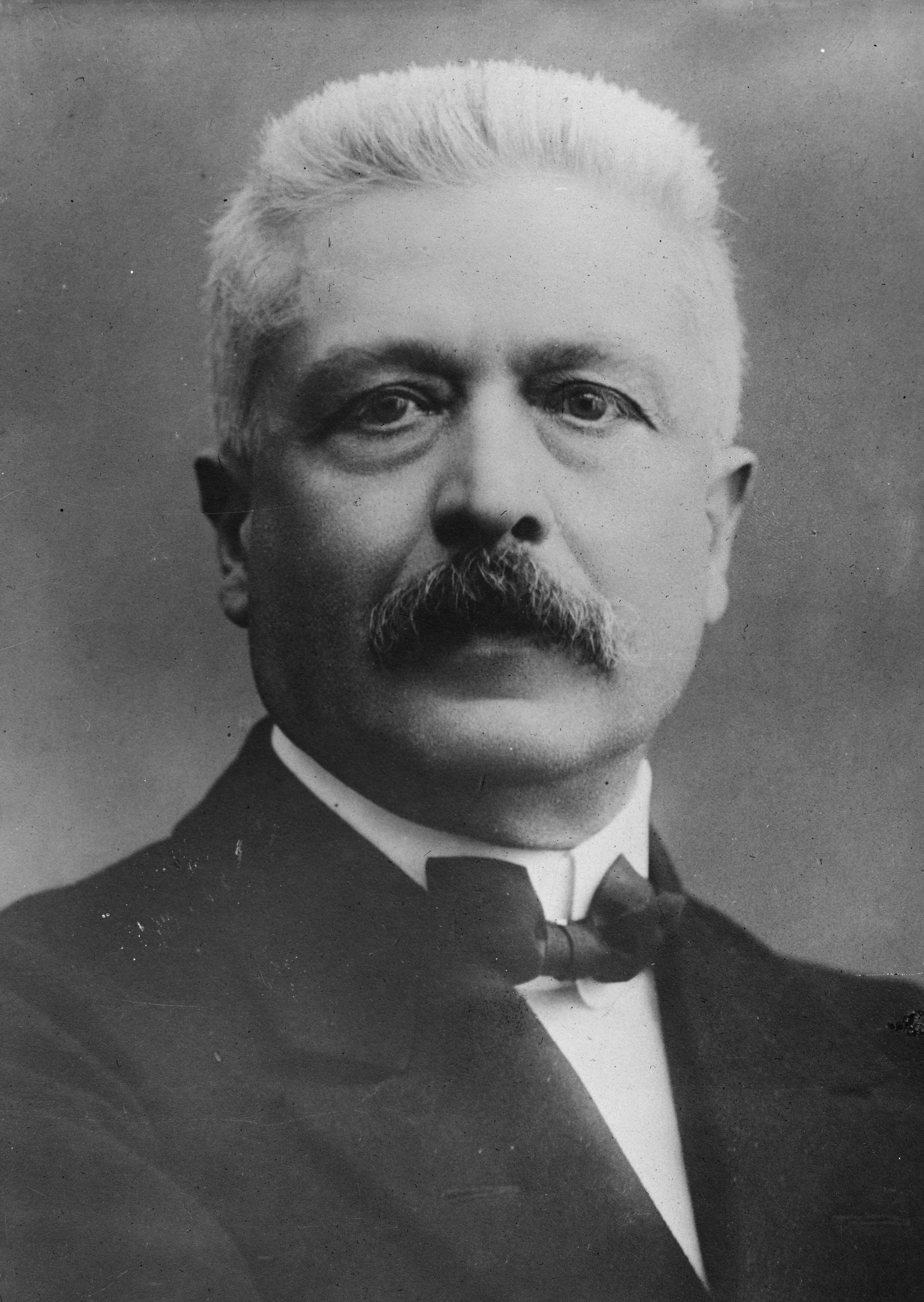
- Date formed: 30 October 1917
- Date dissolved: 23 June 1919

People and organisations
- Head of state: Victor Emmanuel III
- Head of government: Vittorio Emanuele Orlando
- Total no. of members: 19
- Member party: PL, PRI, UECI, PSRI

History
- Predecessor: Boselli Cabinet
- Successor: Nitti I Cabinet

The Orlando government of Italy held office from 30 October 1917 until 23 June 1919, a total of 601 days, or 1 year, 7 months and 24 days.

== Government parties ==
The government was composed by the following parties:

Party	Ideology	Leader
Liberal Party	Liberalism	Giovanni Giolitti
Italian Radical Party	Radicalism	Ettore Sacchi
Italian Catholic Electoral Union	Christian democracy	Ottorino Gentiloni
Italian Reformist Socialist Party	Social democracy	Leonida Bissolati

== Composition ==
Office	Name	Party	Term
Prime Minister	Vittorio Emanuele Orlando	Liberal Party	(1917–1919)
Deputy Prime Minister	Giovanni Villa	Liberal Party	(1919–1919)
Deputy Prime Minister	Gaspare Colosimo	Liberal Party	(1919–1919)
Minister of the Interior	Vittorio Emanuele Orlando	Liberal Party	(1917–1919)
Minister of Foreign Affairs	Sidney Sonnino	Liberal Party	(1917–1919)
Minister of Grace and Justice	Ettore Sacchi	Italian Radical Party	(1917–1919)
Minister of Grace and Justice	Luigi Facta	Liberal Party	(1919–1919)
Minister of Finance	Filippo Meda	Italian Catholic Electoral Union	(1917–1919)
Minister of Treasury	Francesco Saverio Nitti	Italian Radical Party	(1917–1919)
Minister of Treasury	Bonaldo Stringher	Independent	(1919–1919)
Minister of War	Vittorio Luigi Alfieri	Military	(1917–1918)
Minister of War	Vittorio Italico Zupelli	Military	(1918–1919)
Minister of War	Enrico Caviglia	Military	(1919–1919)
Minister of the Navy	Alberto del Bono	Military	(1917–1919)
Minister of Industry, Commerce and Labour	Augusto Ciuffelli	Liberal Party	(1917–1919)
Minister of Public Works	Luigi Dari	Liberal Party	(1917–1919)
Minister of Public Works	Ivanoe Bonomi	Italian Reformist Socialist Party	(1919–1919)
Minister of Maritime and Rails Transport	Riccardo Bianchi	Independent	(1917–1918)
Minister of Maritime and Rails Transport	Giovanni Villa	Liberal Party	(1918–1919)
Minister of Maritime and Rails Transport	Giuseppe De Nava	Liberal Party	(1919–1919)
Minister of Agriculture	Giambattista Miliani	Liberal Party	(1917–1919)
Minister of Agriculture	Vincenzo Riccio	Liberal Party	(1919–1919)
Minister of Public Education	Agostino Berenini	Italian Reformist Socialist Party	(1917–1919)
Minister of Post and Telegraphs	Luigi Fera	Independent	(1917–1919)
Minister of the Colonies	Gaspare Colosimo	Liberal Party	(1917–1919)
Minister for Weapons and Ammunitions	Alfredo Dallolio	Military	(1917–1918)
Minister for Weapons and Ammunitions	Vittorio Italico Zupelli	Military	(1918–1918)
Minister of Military Assistance and War Pensions	Leonida Bissolati	Italian Reformist Socialist Party	(1917–1918)
Minister of Military Assistance and War Pensions	Vittorio Italico Zupelli	Military	(1918–1919)
Minister of Military Assistance and War Pensions	Giuseppe Girardini	Italian Radical Party	(1919–1919)
Minister for Weapons and Transport	Giovanni Villa	Liberal Party	(1918–1918)
Minister for Supplies and Food Consumption	Silvio Crespi	Liberal Party	(1917–1919)
Minister for Supplies and Food Consumption	Maggiorino Ferraris	Liberal Party	(1919–1919)
Minister for the Lands freed by the Enemy	Antonio Fradeletto	Italian Radical Party	(1919–1919)
