= Arturo Triangi di Maderno e Laces =

Italian admiral

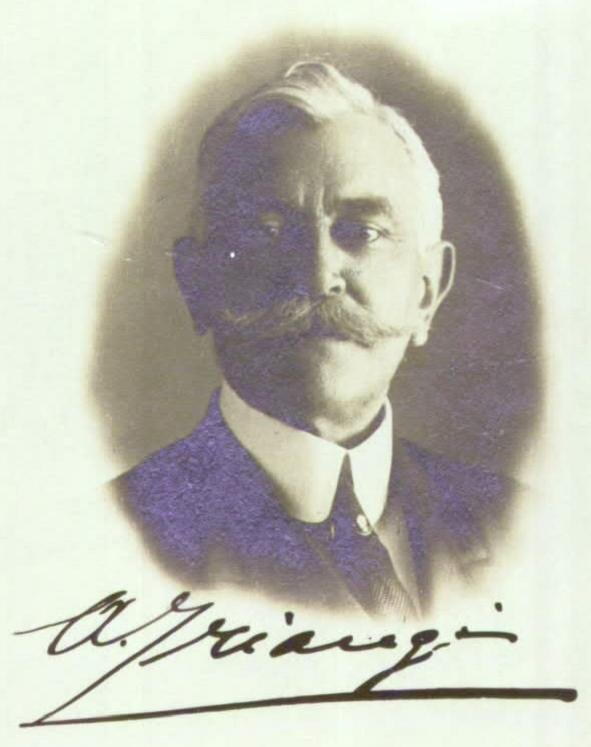

Senator
- In office 25 October 1917 – 3 March 1935
- Preceded by: Camillo Corsi
- Succeeded by: Alberto Del Bono

Minister of the Navy
- In office 16 June 1917 – 16 July 1917

Arturo Corrado Luigi Triangi, Conte di Maderno e Laces (18 February 1864 in Fiesole – 3 March 1935 in Florence) was an Italian admiral. He was also a member of the Senate of the Kingdom of Italy and briefly Minister of the Navy in the Boselli government. A count of the Holy Roman Empire, his title was officially recognised in Italy by a ministerial decree of 8 April 1925.

== Early career ==
Arturo Corrado Luigi Triangi came from a noble family and was the son of Giuseppe Triangi and his wife Elisabetta Thom.

On 16 October 1878, he began training at the Naval School in Genoa. On 1 August 1883, at the end of five years at the naval school, he was appointed ensign of the general staff corps. His first assignment was on the screw corvette Flavio Gioia. Over the next two years on board Flavio Gioia, Triangi voyaged to South America, touching the major Atlantic and Pacific ports of the continent. Returning home on board the aviso Staffetta, he was promoted to second lieutenant in January 1886.

His first assignment on a large vessel came after his appointment as tenente (lieutenant on 14 April 1889, when he was assigned to the ironclad battleship Enrico Dandolo, one of the largest units of the Regia Marina ("Royal Navy"). His first tour as a second officer was on board the Aquila (August–October 1888). His first command was of the torpedo boat the 64.S from 28 June 1896 to 3 June 1898, followed by a second on torpedo boat 133. In November 1902, he was appointed commander of a squadron of torpedo boats. In September 1904 he reached the rank of frigate captain and from 1 December 1909 to 29 September 1911 he commanded the Navy Engineer School. He was promoted to ship-of-the-line captain on 16 January 1910.

== Italo-Turkish War ==
During the Italo-Turkish War, Triangi was sent to Naples, where he was placed in charge of the loading operations of men and supplies destined for Ottoman Libya. In March 1912, with the reorganization of the combined naval forces, Triangi was given overall naval command in Ottoman Tripolitania aboard the armored cruiser Carlo Alberto with the armored cruiser Marco Polo, the torpedo cruisers Coatit and Agordat, and the torpedo boats Partenope and Iride. He was tasked with maintaining control of the Tripolitanian coast and suppressing the smuggling of weapons in to Ottoman and indigenous forces who opposed the Italian invasion.

He took part in the capture of Sidi Said (27–28 June 1912), the units under his command supporting the action led by General Alberto Cavaciocchi with his ships’ guns. With the same ships, Triangi also took part in the taking of Misrata. During the early stages of the operation his ships bombarded enemy forces along the Zeira coast in preparation for an amphibious assault.

== First World War ==
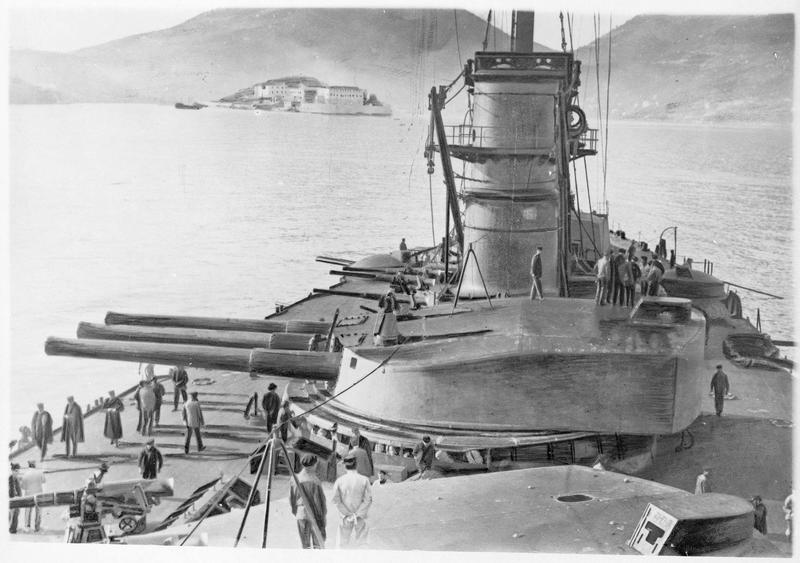
The dreadnought Dante Alighieri in 1915.

From 1 May 1913 until 28 August 1914, Triangi was chief of staff of the 2nd naval squadron, serving aboard the battleship Regina Elena and then the dreadnought Dante Alighieri. At the outbreak of the World War I he was seconded as chief of staff of the maritime military department of Venice, a position he held from 1 October 1914 to 1 February 1917. He was also promoted to rear admiral on 18 May 1916.

In Venice, Triangi worked with Vice Admiral Paolo Thaon di Revel, who had recently resigned as Navy Chief of Staff and been assigned to the Venice base. Together they developed naval and air operations in the Adriatic Sea. In February 1917, when Thaon di Revel returned to office as Navy Chief of Staff, Triangi was appointed (1 February – 20 March 1917) to the position of general director of the royal crew corps. From 18 February 1917 he was transferred to an auxiliary role because of his age, but despite this Thaon di Revel appointed him deputy chief of staff of the navy, a position he held until 16 June 1917.

== Political career ==
A political crisis developed in the Boselli government in 1917 over the exceptionally high shipping losses Italy was suffering as a result of Imperial German Navy submarine activity, seriously disrupting the country's war industries. The Minister of the Nayvy, Camillo Corsi, resigned and Thaon di Revel lobbied for Triangi to replace him. Triangi was appointed in his place on 16 June 1917 and a few days later was also made a senator of the Kingdom of Italy.

His period in office lasted only a matter of weeks. During a closed-door meeting in the Chamber of Deputies, he argued that the crisis in maritime transport could not easily be resolved, because the April 1917 entry of the United States into the war was placing significant new demands on merchant shipping, meaning less was available for Italian use. News of his pessimistic views reached the press, fueling public anxiety about shortages. Shaken by the incident, Triangi's health began to suffer, prompting him to resign on 15 July 1917. He also wrote to Count Giuseppe Manfredi, president of the Senate, offering resign his seat there too as he had been so briefly in office, but his offer was not accepted.

After his resignation, Triangi returned to the position of deputy chief of staff to Thaon di Revel. On 26 August 1918 he was promoted to vice admiral of the naval reserve, a rank he retained until he left the general staff on 16 September 1918 and was placed in reserve. By ministerial decree of 8 April 1925 he was elevated to Conte di Maderno e Laces ("Count of Maderno and Laces") and on 16 September 1926 he was granted the rank of admiral in the naval reserve. His marriage to Lucia Misserly produced the children Anna Maddalena, Corrado and Sabina.

== Honours ==
Grand Officer of the order of the Crown of Italy - ribbon for ordinary uniform

Grand Officer of the order of the Crown of Italy

Commander of the Order of Saints Maurice and Lazarus - ribbon for ordinary uniform

Commander of the Order of Saints Maurice and Lazarus

Knight of the Military Order of Savoy - ribbon for ordinary uniform

Knight of the Military Order of Savoy

War Merit Cross - ribbon for ordinary uniform

War Merit Cross
