= Dell'Olio =

Dell'Olio is an Italian surname. Notable people with this name include the following:

- Cory Dell'Olio (born 1989), Australian rules football player
- Donato Maria Dell'Olio (1847–1902), Italian archbishop and cardinal
- Gianmauro Dell'Olio (born 1968), Italian politician
- Luigi dell'Olio, Italian civil engineer and academic
- Nancy Dell'Olio, Italian-American lawyer and media personality

== See also ==
- Lawrence Dallaglio
- Dall'Oglio
- Dall'Olio / Dallolio
