= Fourth Giolitti government =

48th Government of Kingdom of Italy

Giolitti IV government
- 48th Cabinet of Italy

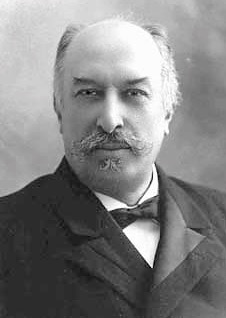
- Date formed: 30 March 1911
- Date dissolved: 21 March 1914

People and organisations
- Head of state: Victor Emmanuel III
- Head of government: Giovanni Giolitti
- Total no. of members: 12
- Member party: Liberals; Radical Party

History
- Predecessor: Luzzatti Cabinet
- Successor: Salandra I Cabinet

The Giolitti IV government of Italy held office from 30 March 1911 until 21 March 1914, a total of 1,087 days, or 2 years, 11 months and 19 days.

== Government parties ==
The government was composed by the following parties:

Party	Ideology	Leader
Liberals	Liberalism	Giovanni Giolitti
Radical Party	Radicalism	Ettore Sacchi

== Composition ==
Office	Name	Party	Term
Prime Minister	Giovanni Giolitti	Liberal	(1911–1914)
Minister of the Interior	Giovanni Giolitti	Liberal	(1911–1914)
Minister of Foreign Affairs	Antonino Paternò Castello	Liberal	(1911–1914)
Minister of Grace and Justice	Camillo Finocchiaro Aprile	Liberal	(1911–1914)
Minister of Finance	Luigi Facta	Liberal	(1911–1914)
Minister of Treasury	Francesco Tedesco	Liberal	(1911–1914)
Minister of War	Paolo Spingardi	Military	(1911–1914)
Minister of the Navy	Pasquale Leonardi Cattolica	Military	(1911–1913)
Minister of the Navy	Enrico Millo	Military	(1913–1914)
Minister of Agriculture, Industry and Commerce	Francesco Saverio Nitti	Radical	(1911–1914)
Minister of Public Works	Ettore Sacchi	Radical	(1911–1914)
Minister of Public Education	Luigi Credaro	Radical	(1911–1914)
Minister of the Colonies	Pietro Bertolini	Liberal	(1912–1914)
Minister of Post and Telegraphs	Teobaldo Calissano	Liberal	(1911–1913)
Minister of Post and Telegraphs	Francesco Tedesco	Liberal	(1913–1913)
Minister of Post and Telegraphs	Gaspare Colosimo	Liberal	(1913–1914)
