= Alfredo Dallolio =

Italian general and politician

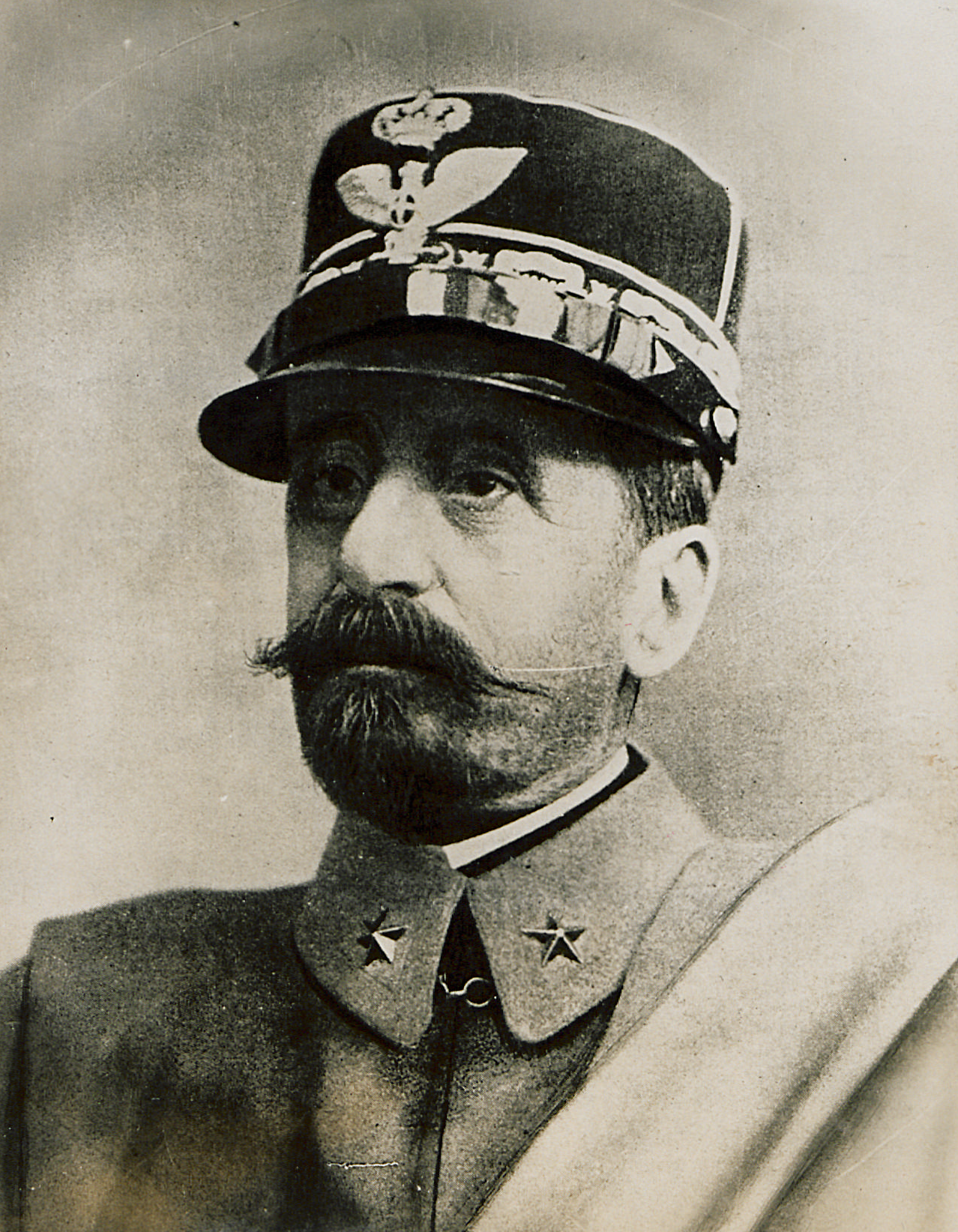

Minister for Arms and Munitions
- In office 16 June 1917 – 14 May 1918
- Monarch: Victor Emmanuel III
- Prime Minister: Paolo Boselli, Vittorio Emanuele Orlando
- Preceded by: Office created
- Succeeded by: Vittorio Italico Zupelli (acting)

Senator of the Kingdom of Italy
- In office 1917–1952

Personal details
- Born: 21 June 1853 Bologna, The Papal States
- Died: 20 September 1952 (aged 99) Rome, Italy
- Education: Turin Military Academy

Military service
- Allegiance: Kingdom of Italy
- Branch/service: Artillery Corps, Royal Italian Army
- Years of service: 1870–1923
- Rank: Lieutenant General
- Battles/wars: Italo-Turkish War
- Awards: Knight Grand Cordon of the Order of Saints Maurice and Lazarus; Knight Grand Cross of the Order of the Crown of Italy; Commander of the Military Order of Savoy; Military Service Cross; Commemorative Medal for the Italo-Turkish War 1911-1912; Army Distinguished Service Medal (United States)

Alfredo Dallolio (21 June 1853 – 20 September 1952) was an Italian general and politician who served as the Minister of Munitions during the First World War.

== Biography ==
He graduated from the Turin military academy as a second lieutenant in 1872. Promoted to colonel in 1905, he served as artillery commander of the Padua army corps and was promoted in 1910 to major general for special merit. In 1911 he became inspector general of artillery and engineering and in 1914 promoted to divisional lieutenant general.

From July 1915 he served as undersecretary for Armaments and Munitions in the Ministry for War in the second Salandra government. From June 1916 he was first undersecretary and then, from 1917, an independent Minister of Arms and Munitions of the Kingdom of Italy in the Boselli and Orlando governments. He was appointed senator of the kingdom in 1917 by the king Victor Emmanuel III. He created a ‘central committee for industrial mobilization’ and a network of regional committees representing both arms industry manufacturers and workers. In 1918 he resigned because of corruption allegations. Afterwards he served as inspector general of artillery until 1920, when he was placed in reserves.

After being called back into service by the Mussolini government and promoted to corps lieutenant general on 1 February 1923, he was head of the General Commissariat for War Production continuously until 28 August 1939, when he resigned in tacit protest against the imminent Italian entrance into World War II for which the essential means were lacking. His resignation made an impression in the military circles of the time because it was unequivocal testimony to the unpreparedness of the Army, but it did not lead to any practical consequences in the General Staff. He was not a member of the National Fascist Party and was exonerated in 1946 by the High Court of Justice for Sanctions against Fascism.

== Bibliography ==
- Ruggero Zangrandi, Il lungo viaggio attraverso il fascismo. Milano, Feltrinelli, 1976
- Media related to Alfredo Dallolio at Wikimedia Commons
