= Nelio =

Nelio is a name. Notable people with the name include:

== Given name ==
- Nélio José Nicolai (1940-2017), Brazilian electrotechnician who invented caller ID
- Nélio (footballer, born 1943), full name Nélio dos Santos Pereira, Brazilian football midfielder
- Nelio Dallolio (fl. 1948-1950), American college football head coach
- Nélio (footballer, born 1971), full name Nélio da Silva Melo, Brazilian football midfielder

== Surname ==
- Daniel López Nelio (1949-2004), Mexican politician
