= Federico Pescetto =

Italian politician and general

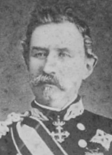

Foreign Minister
- In office 10 April 1867 – 12 April 1867
- Preceded by: Emilio Visconti Venosta
- Succeeded by: Pompeo Di Campello

Minister of the Navy
- In office 10 April 1867 – 26 October 1867
- Preceded by: Giuseppe Biancheri
- Succeeded by: Luigi Federico Menabrea

Senator
- In office 27 May 1879 – 25 September 1882

Member of the Chamber of Deputies
- In office 18 February 1861 – 2 November 1870

Member of the Chamber of Deputies (Sardinia)
- In office 29 March 1860 – 17 December 1860

Federico Giovanni Battista Pescetto (Savona, 13 November 1817 – Savona, 15 September 1882) was an Italian politician and general. He was senator of the Kingdom of Italy and Minister of the Navy in the second Rattazzi government; in the same government he held the position of Foreign Minister on an interim basis.

== Early life ==
Federico was the eldest son of Niccolò Pescetto and Benedetta Colla, descendant of an illustrious family from Celle Ligure. His maternal uncle it:Federico Colla was a senator of the Kingdom of Sardinia. His father lost his fortune and emigrated to South America, dying in Lima in 1855.

He was admitted to the Royal Military Academy of Turin in 1827. After graduating he held the ranks of sub-lieutenant (1835) and lieutenant (1837) in the Engineers. In 1840 he moved to Novara and married his cousin Annetta Biale, with whom he had thirteen children, four of whom died young. In 1841 he was promoted to captain.

== Career as a military engineer ==
Pescetto worked on a number of military construction projects and in 1857 he was appointed to prepare the plans for the proposed new arsenal at La Spezia, constructed by it:Domeco Chiodo. He was promoted to colonel in 1860, major general in 1862 and then lieutenant general in 1873. In 1860 he was appointed director of the Alessandria Corps of Engineers and was a member of the committees for military engineering (1862) and for artillery and engineering weapons (1873). He served as a judge in the Supreme Court of War and then of War and Navy (December 1866; November 1867-February 1870; December 1874-November 1881). He enjoyed the favour and friendship of king Vittorio Emanuele II.

== Political career ==
In 1849 the electors of Varazze selected him to be their candidate for election in the Parliament of the Kingdom of Sardinia. He declined the position but it did suggest the possibility of a political career. At the height of the unification of Italy in 1860, Pescetto stood for election and was returned from the Varazze constituency as a representative of the centre-left. In the Chamber of Deputies he spoke in favour of the cession of Nice and Savoy following the Treaty of Turin (1860). He stood for election again in the Chamber of Deputies of the Kingdom of Italy, winning in a run-off for Savona. He was a member of various parliamentary commissions, in particular one examining the laws on naval conscription (1861) and establishing the Court of Auditors (1862). He was a frequent contributor to debates about the progress of works in La Spezia, and the navy budget more generally. Indeed it was said that he was heartily detested by successive Ministers of the Navy because of his constant questioning and probing.

He was offered the position of Minister of the Navy twice, and twice refused it, claiming that he would be unable to restrain himself in the Chamber if he was accused of bad faith, as a minister might expect to be. Eventually however he agreed to enter the Rattazzi cabinet when it was formed on 10 April 1867 - he took on the portfolio of Foreign Minister on an interim basis for two days as well the Ministry of the Navy. His service as Navy Minister was brief. Among the measures he introduced was an unsuccessful one to use navy corvettes and their crews to establish a commercial navigation company serving destinations in Italy, the Mediterranean, and the United States. The proposal was strongly opposed by Nino Bixio, who argued that it would be an imprudent use of naval resources and detrimental to the morale of the ships’ crews. The proposal was abandoned.

== Garibaldi controversy ==
The Rattazzi cabinet was brought down by a controversy over its treatment of Giuseppe Garibaldi, in which Pescetto was directly involved. In 1867 Garibaldi was planning to lead a guerilla attempt to seize Rome for Italy, but was arrested by the Italian authorities at Sinalunga before he could execute his plan, and imprisoned in Alessandria. Pescetto was sent to Alessandria by Prime Minister Rattazzi to persuade Garibaldi to give up his aspiration to take Rome and retire again to Caprera. Pescetto, an admirer of Garibaldi, allowed him to leave captivity without securing the commitments he had been instructed to require. Garibaldi returned to exile in Caprera but shortly afterwards escaped, returned to Florence (at that time the capital of Italy), and led an invasion of the Papal States that culminated in the Battle of Mentana.

As both Garibaldi and Pescetto were Freemasons there were allegations of collusion which surfaced during the 1870 general elections, in which Pescetto lost his seat. In the meantime, public anger over the imprisonment of Garibaldi brought the whole cabinet down in October 1869. In addition to this, Pescetto was accused in some quarters of personally contributing to the condemnation of the disgraced Admiral Persano.

== Later life ==
Pescetto was nominated as a senator in March 1879 and sworn in on 27 May but took no active part in the work of the Senate. He was moved from active service in the army to reserve duties in 1881. In 1871 he was elected to the Council of the Order of the Grand Orient of Italy.

== Honours ==
Federico Pescetto received a number of Italian and foreign honours:

Grand Officer of the Order of Saints Maurice and Lazarus - ribbon for ordinary uniform

Grand Officer of the Order of Saints Maurice and Lazarus

Grand Cordon of the Order of the Crown of Italy - ribbon for ordinary uniform

Grand Cordon of the Order of the Crown of Italy

Grand Cordon of the Nichan Iftikhar

Grand Cordon of the Nichan Iftikhar (Tunisia)

Grand Cross of the Order of San Marino

Grand Cross of the Order of San Marino (San Marino)
