= Luigi Fera =

Italian lawyer and politician

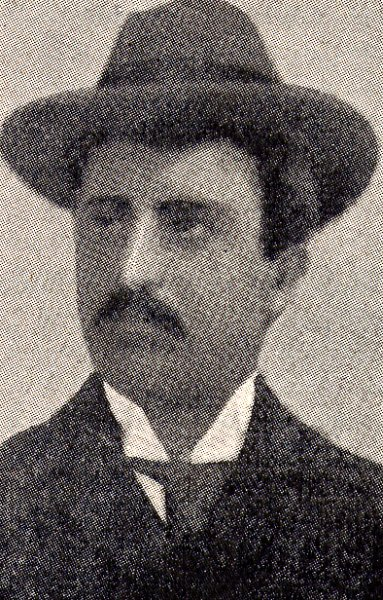

Minister of Posts and Telegraphs
- In office 18 June 1916 – 23 June 1919
- Preceded by: Vincenzo Riccio
- Succeeded by: Roberto De Vito

Minister of Justice
- In office 15 June 1920 – 4 July 1921
- Preceded by: Alfredo Falcioni
- Succeeded by: Giulio Rodinò

Member of the Chamber of Deputies
- In office 30 November 1904 – 25 January 1924

Luigi Fera (Cellara, 12 June 1868 – Rome, 9 May 1935) was an Italian lawyer and politician. He was the first Calabrian politician to have prominent and enduring ministerial roles.

== Early life ==
Having obtained his high school diploma he moved to Naples, where he attended courses in law and philosophy. He was a student of the philosophers Giovanni Bovio and Filippo Masci and he frequented the journalists Matilde Serao and Edoardo Scarfoglio.

A leading figure in the cultural life of Cosenza at the end of the 19th century, Fera was a successful criminal lawyer, a philosophy teacher at the Bernardino Telesio high school, a member of the Accademia Cosentina of which he became perpetual secretary at a very young age, and editor-in-chief of the anticlerical weekly La Lotta. A freemason, he was elected mayor of Cosenza in 1900 and then elected to the Chamber of Deputies from the Rogliano constituency in 1904.

== Parliamentary career ==
He spoke frequently in the chamber to advocate for the needs of his home region, often on the topic of railways. After the 1905 Calabria earthquake he was among the leaders of the parliamentary caucus that succeeded in securing a law on Calabria on 26 June 1906, providing for reconstruction and public works. In 1911 he was rapporteur on the bill for the master plan of Cosenza, which became law no. 746 of 30 June 1912.

Fera originally sat in the Chamber as an independent radical, but in 1907 became a member of the central leadership of the Italian Radical Party. At the fourth party congress he co-authored with Gino Bandini a report on electoral reform, arguing for universal suffrage and proportional representation. On 18 March 1911 he intervened on behalf of the radical group in the Chamber debate that caused the fall of the Luzzatti government, strongly supporting electoral reform. In the electoral campaign of 1913 and at the radical congress in Rome in February 1914 Fera argued for policies much more radical and secular than those supported by Giolitti.

Despite the radicalism of his domestic politics, Fera was an interventionist in foreign policy, supporting both the Italian invasion of Libya and Italy’s entry into the First World War. Oddly he initially favoured an alliance with Austria-Hungary, but later declared himself in favor of war alongside France against Austria.

== Ministerial career ==
After being in the radical opposition for over a decade, he was appointed postal minister from 1916 to 1919 in the Boselli government (18 June 1916 to 30 October 1917 ) and in the Orlando government (30 October 1917 to 23 June 1919) and Minister of Justice from 1920 to 1921 in the fifth Giolitti government (15 June 1920 to 4 July 1921).

As Minister of Posts he introduced co-interest funds, a tool for simplification of services. His work led to the royal decree of 2 October 1919, n. 1858, the Fera-Chimenti decree, on the organization of postal, telegraphic and telephone offices and personnel. In Cosenza he had the post office built on Lungo Busento.

In the fifth government of Giovanni Giolitti (15 June 1920 - 4 July 1921) he was appointed to the Ministry of Justice, where he proposed several bills for the reform of the judicial system, on the legal profession and on the organisation of judicial districts.

== Fascist era ==
In the electoral speech delivered in Catanzaro on 15 May 1921, Fera expressed his position on fascism: "the fascists offered determined resistance to the violence that the communists had committed for long months in some provinces, imposing respect for national symbols and the will of the majority, sometimes destroying the trade union bodies, and thus engaging in violent conflicts, which were the cause of serious deaths".

Fera was elected as a deputy of the Social Democracy Party, serving on its National Council. He nevertheless maintained a positive view of fascism even after the march on Rome. Indeed while distancing himself from the excesses of fascism, he was confident it would evolve in a democratic direction and would come to include the liberal parties in its system.

In 1923 he was a member of the Commission of Eighteen, chaired by Giovanni Giolitti, for the examination of the Acerbo law, where, faced with the fascists' intention to annul other political parties, he began to develop a critical position towards the regime. In 1924, revising his previously positive view of Mussolini, he retired from political activity and returned to his legal practice in Rome.
