= Camillo Corsi =

Italian admiral and politician

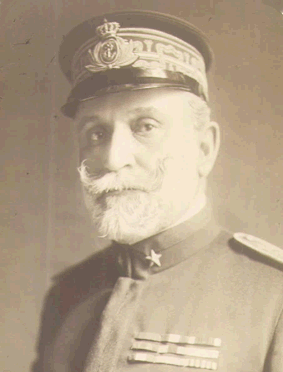

Minister of the Navy
- In office 30 September 1915 – 16 June 1917
- Preceded by: Antonio Salandra (interim)
- Succeeded by: Arturo Triangi di Maderno e Laces

Senator
- In office 15 December 1915 – 17 July 1921

Camillo Corsi (Rome, 13 May 1860 - Rome, 17 July 1921) was an Italian admiral and politician. He served as Minister of the Navy of the Kingdom of Italy in the second Salandra government and the Boselli government.

== Early life ==
Corsi was the son of Tito Corsi and his wife Teresa Mazzetti. He enrolled at the Scuola di marina in 1874 and embarked on a naval career when he graduated in 1879. He took part in the Italo-Ethiopian War of 1887–1889 as a tenente (lieutenant. In 1905 he was made chief of staff of Minister of the Navy Carlo Mirabello, where he assisted with the task of modernising and developing the Italian Regia Marina ("Royal Navy"). He was also editor of the Rivista Marittima for several years.

He saw service in the Italo-Turkish War of 1911–1912, initially as a captain, though he was promoted to rear admiral in 1911 and also served as deputy chief of staff of the navy under Admiral Leone Viale. He distinguished himself in the occupation of several islands in the Aegean Sea and the assault on the Ottoman forts in the Dardanelles.

In 1914 he was made commander of the Royal Naval Academy, and in 1915, when Italy entered the World War I, he was appointed commander of the First Naval squadron, with the battleship Conte di Cavour as is flagship, as well as chief of staff of the fleet.

== Political career ==
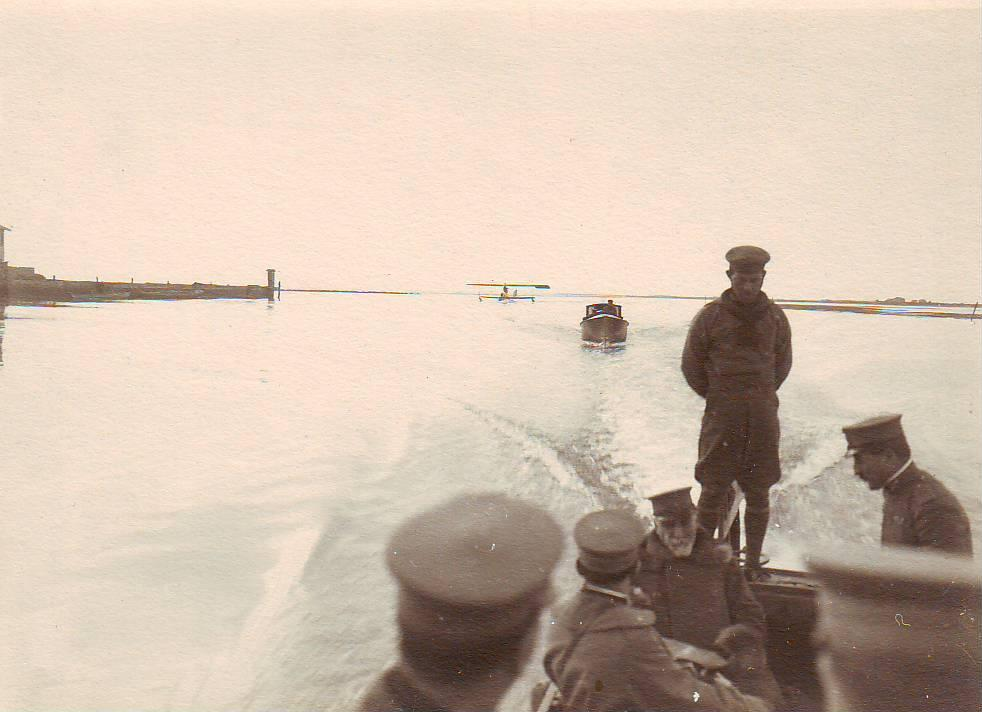
Visit of Navy Minister Camillo Corsi from Grado to Passo Rolle

On 24 September 1915 Navy Minister Leone Viale resigned following prolonged disagreements between Navy Chief of Staff Paolo Thaon di Revel and the commander-in-chief of the fleet, the Duke of Abruzzi, over the conduct of the naval war. A few days later the battleship Benedetto Brin blew up in the harbour of Brindisi in what was thought to be an act of Austrio-Hungarian sabotage.

Prime Minister Salandra invited Corsi to join his cabinet, replacing Viale as Navy Minister. Corsi supported the ideas of the Duke of Abruzzi, so just 11 days after his appointment as minister, Thaon di Revel also resigned. Thereafter Corsi combined his former post with his cabinet role. This arrangement was intended to streamline command and reduce the tensions and disagreements that had plagued the navy since it entered the war. Soon after his ministerial appointment he was also sworn in as a senator of the Kingdom of Italy.

Although he served as a minister for nearly two years, the experiment of combining his cabinet role with a naval one was not judged a success, and in June 1917 Thaon Di Revel returned to his former post as navy chief of staff, while his protégé Arturo Triangi took over as minister.

Corsi returned to active naval service, and in 1918 he was moved to an auxiliary role.

== Honours ==
Grand Cordon of the Order of Saints Maurice and Lazarus - ribbon for ordinary uniform

Grand Cordon of the Order of Saints Maurice and Lazarus

Grand Cordon of the Order of the Crown of Italy - ribbon for ordinary uniform

Grand Cordon of the Order of the Crown of Italy

Commander of the Military Order of Savoy - ribbon for ordinary uniform

Commander of the Military Order of Savoy
