= Luigi Dari =

Italian politician

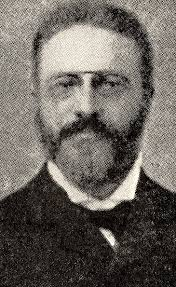
- Born: 11 December 1852; Folignano, Italy
- Died: 15 April 1919 (aged 66); Spello, Italy
- Occupation: Politician

Luigi Dari (11 December 1852 – 15 April 1919) was an Italian politician. He held the position of mayor of Ancona four times.

== Ministerial career ==
He was Minister of Justice in the first Salandra government and Minister of Public Works in the Orlando government.

As Minister of Justice, Dari immediately presented to the Chamber a complex reform of the civil process, abolishing the single-judge courts introduced by the Law of 1912 and boosting the recruitment of magistrates to fill the chronic shortages in the judicial system. To address some of the longer-term problems in the system Dari established Commissions of the Chamber of Deputies, the Senate and the Supreme Court of Cassation. On 3 July 1914, an ambitious bill containing "provisions concerning the personnel of the Judiciary and judicial chancelleries" became law. All of this was achieved in just three months.

When the Salandra government resigned, Dari wrote to the Prime Minister recommending the Sicilian Vittorio Emanuele Orlando as his successor. In November 1917 Orlando himself was forming a new government, and offered Dari the Ministry of Public Works. He assumed this responsibility at a time when the government was facing in the exceptional problems of war. Dari oversaw an energetic programme of infrastructure.

On 18 January 1919, following the premature death of his wife Rina (with whom he had no children), Dari resigned from his post, and died himself only a few months later.
