= Minister of the Navy (Italy) =

- Ministri della Marina del Regno
- Flag of the minister of the navy

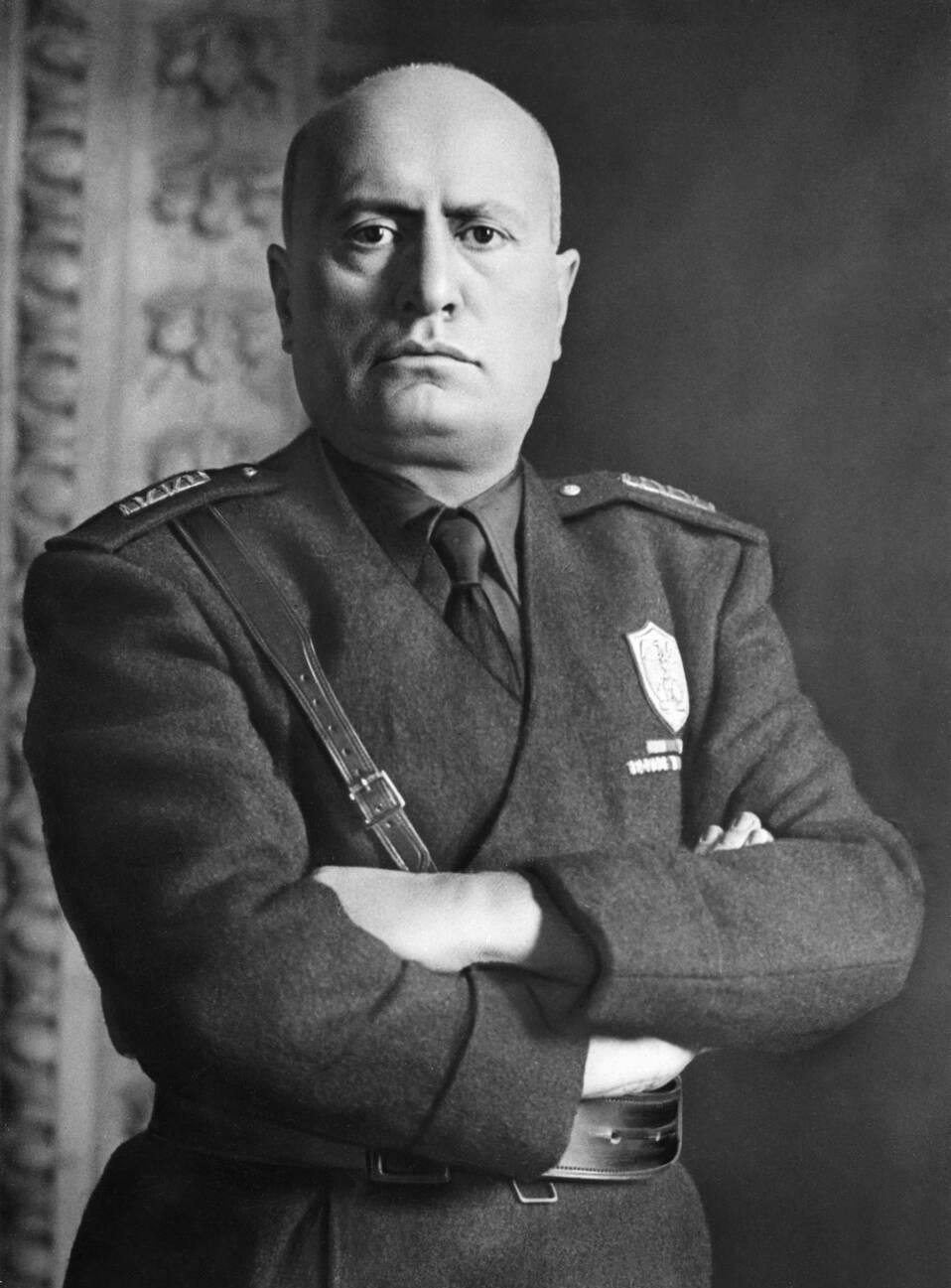
- Longest serving Benito Mussolini; 8 May 1925–12 September 1929; 1 January 1933–25 July 1943
- Member of: Council Ministers
- Reports to: Prime Minister
- Formation: 17 March 1861
- First holder: Camillo Benso
- Final holder: Giuseppe Micheli
- Abolished: 4 February 1947
- Succession: Minister of Defence

The Italian minister of the navy was a member of the Council Ministers from 1861 until 1947. Under the Kingdom of Italy from 1861 to 1946, the minister oversaw the Regia Marina ("Royal Navy"), and his position was known officially as Ministri della marina del Regno d'Italia ("Minister of the Navy of the Kingdom of Italy"), while under the Italian Republic from 1946 to 1947 he oversaw the Marina Militare (literally "Military Navy," but usually translated as "Italian Navy") and was known officially as Ministro per la Marina Militare (literally "Minister for the Military Navy"), the name change becoming official on 13 July 1946. The position was abolished when the Ministry of the Navy merged with the Ministry of the Air Force and Ministry of War to form the Ministry of Defence in 1947.

The last minister of the navy was Giuseppe Micheli, who served in the government of Alcide De Gasperi.

== List of ministers ==
=== Kingdom of Italy ===
Parties

- 1861–1912:

Historical Right Historical Left Military

- 1912–1922:

Liberals Social Democracy Military

- 1922–1943:

National Fascist Party

- 1943–1946:

Christian Democracy Military

Governments

Rightist coalition Leftist coalition Liberal coalition Fascist Military Mixed coalition

Name (Born–Died)	Portrait	Term of office		Political party	Government
Camillo Benso, Count of Cavour (1810–1861)		17 March 1861	6 June 1861	Historical Right	Cavour IV
Luigi Federico Menabrea (1809–1896)		12 June 1861	3 March 1862	Historical Right	Ricasoli I
Carlo Pellion di Persano (1806–1883)		3 March 1862	8 December 1862	Military	Rattazzi I
Giovanni Ricci (1813–1892)		8 December 1862	22 January 1863	Military	Farini
Orazio Di Negro (1810–1872)		25 January 1863	20 April 1863	Military	Farini; Minghetti I
Efisio Cugia (1818–1872)		20 April 1863	28 September 1864	Military	Minghetti I
Alfonso Ferrero La Marmora (1804–1878)		28 September 1864	21 December 1864	Historical Right	La Marmora II
Diego Angioletti (1822–1905)		21 December 1864	20 June 1866	Military	La Marmora II·III
Agostino Depretis (1813–1887)		20 June 1866	17 February 1867	Historical Left	Ricasoli II
Giuseppe Biancheri (1821–1908)		17 February 1867	10 April 1867	Historical Right	Ricasoli II
Federico Pescetto (1817–1882)		10 April 1867	27 October 1867	Historical Right	Rattazzi II
Luigi Federico Menabrea (1809–1896)		27 October 1867	18 November 1867	Historical Right	Menabrea I
Pompeo Provana del Sabbione (1816–1884)		18 November 1867	5 January 1868	Military	Menabrea I
Augusto Riboty (1816–1888)		5 January 1868	14 December 1869	Military	Menabrea II·III
Stefano Castagnola (1825–1891)		14 December 1869	15 January 1870	Historical Right	Lanza
Guglielmo Acton (1825–1896)		15 January 1870	5 August 1872	Military	Lanza
Augusto Riboty (1816–1888)		5 August 1872	10 July 1873	Military	Lanza
Simone Antonio Saint-Bon (1828–1892)		10 July 1873	25 March 1876	Military	Minghetti II
Benedetto Brin (1828–1892)		25 March 1876	24 March 1878	Military	Depretis I·II
Enrico Di Brocchetti (1817–1885)		24 March 1878	24 August 1878	Historical Left	Cairoli I
Benedetto Brin (1828–1892)		24 August 1878	19 December 1878	Military	Cairoli I
Niccolò Ferracciù (1815–1892)		19 December 1878	14 July 1878	Historical Left	Depretis III
Cesare Bonelli (1821–1904)		14 July 1878	25 November 1879	Military	Cairoli II
Ferdinando Acton (1832–1891)		25 November 1879	17 November 1883	Military	Cairoli III; Depretis IV·V
Andrea Del Santo (1830–1905)		17 November 1883	30 March 1884	Military	Depretis V
Benedetto Brin (1828–1892)		30 March 1884	6 February 1891	Military	Depretis VI·VII·VIII; Crispi I·II
Antonio Starabba, Marchese di Rudinì (1839–1908)		6 February 1891	15 February 1891	Historical Right	Rudinì I
Simone Antonio Saint-Bon (1828–1892)		15 February 1891	28 September 1892	Military	Di Rudinì I
Simone Antonio Saint-Bon (1828–1892)		15 February 1891	28 September 1892	Military	Giolitti I
Benedetto Brin (1828–1892)		28 September 1892	8 December 1892	Military	Giolitti I
Carlo Alberto Racchia (1833–1896)		8 December 1892	15 December 1893	Military	Giolitti I
Enrico Morin (1841–1910)		15 December 1893	10 March 1896	Military	Crispi III·IV
Benedetto Brin (1828–1892)		10 March 1896	24 May 1898	Military	Di Rudinì II·III·IV
Alessandro Asinari di San Marzano (1830–1906)		24 May 1898	1 June 1898	Military	Di Rudinì IV
Felice Napoleone Canevaro (1838–1926)		1 June 1898	29 June 1898	Military	Rudinì V
Giuseppe Palumbo (1840–1913)		29 June 1898	14 May 1899	Military	Pelloux I
Giovanni Bettolo (1846–1916)		14 May 1899	24 June 1900	Military	Pelloux II
Enrico Morin (1841–1910)		24 June 1900	22 April 1903	Military	Saracco; Zanardelli
Giovanni Bettolo (1846–1916)		22 April 1903	21 June 1903	Military	Zanardelli
Enrico Morin (1841–1910)		21 June 1903	3 September 1903	Military	Zanardelli
Giovanni Giolitti (1842–1928)		3 September 1903	9 November 1903	Historical Left	Giolitti II
Carlo Mirabello (1847–1910)		9 November 1903	10 December 1909	Military	Giolitti II; Fortis I·II; Sonnino I Giolitti III
Giovanni Bettolo (1846–1916)		11 December 1909	31 March 1910	Military	Sonnino II
Pasquale Leonardi Cattolica (1854–1924)		31 March 1910	29 July 1913	Military	Sonnino II
Pasquale Leonardi Cattolica (1854–1924)		31 March 1910	29 July 1913	Military	Giolitti IV
Enrico Millo (1865–1930)		29 July 1913	13 July 1914	Military	Giolitti IV; Salandra I
Leone Viale (1851–1918)		13 July 1914	24 September 1915	Military	Salandra I·II
Camillo Corsi (1860–1921)		30 September 1915	16 June 1917	Military	Salandra II; Boselli
Arturo Triangi di Maderno e Laces (1864–1935)		16 June 1917	16 July 1917	Military	Boselli
Alberto Del Bono (1856–1932)		16 July 1917	23 June 1919	Military	Boselli; Orlando
Giovanni Sechi (1871–1948)		23 June 1919	4 July 1921	Military	Nitti I·II; Giolitti V
Eugenio Bergamasco (1858–1940)		4 July 1921	26 February 1921	Liberals	Bonomi I
Roberto De Vito (1867–1959)		26 February	28 October 1922	Social Democracy	Facta I·II
Paolo Thaon di Revel (1859–1948)		28 October 1922	8 May 1925	Military	Mussolini
Benito Mussolini (1883–1945)		8 May 1925	12 September 1929	National Fascist Party	Mussolini
Giuseppe Sirianni (1874–1955)		12 September 1929	1 January 1933	National Fascist Party	Mussolini
Benito Mussolini (1883–1945)		1 January 1933	25 July 1943	National Fascist Party	Mussolini
Raffaele de Courten (1888–1978)		28 July 1943	14 July 1946	Military	Badoglio I
Raffaele de Courten (1888–1978)		28 July 1943	14 July 1946	Military	Badoglio II; Bonomi II·III; Parri; De Gasperi I

=== Italian Republic ===
Name (Born–Died)	Portrait	Term of office		Political party	Government
Giuseppe Micheli (1874–1948)		14 July 1946	4 February 1947	Christian Democracy	De Gasperi
Minister of Defence (see list)

== See also ==
- Minister of the Air Force (Italy)
- Minister of Defence (Italy)
- Minister of War (Italy)
