= Roberto De Vito =

Italian jurist and politician (1867–1959)

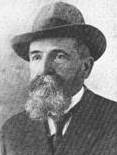

Personal details
- Born: 19 February 1867 Florence, Kingdom of Italy
- Died: 13 August 1959 (aged 92) Rome, Italy

Roberto De Vito (1867–1959) was an Italian jurist and politician who held various cabinet posts.

== Early life and education ==
De Vito was born in Florence on 19 February 1867. He held a degree in law.

== Career ==
After his graduation, De Vito worked as a solicitor and lawyers. He also held positions in insurance companies, and in 1909 he was appointed a member of the Council of State. On 19 May 1912, he was elected to the Council of Deputies in the by-election representing Giulianova. The following year he was also elected deputy from the same region. De Vito was appointed minister of public works and also a commissioner for fuels. He held both posts from 19 June 1916 to August 1917. He also served in the same posts in the subsequent cabinet of Vittorio Emanuele Orlando from October 1917 to 23 June 1919.

De Vito was elected to the Chamber in the elections of 1919 and 1921. He was appointed minister of maritime and rail transport in the Nitti cabinet which he held from 23 June 1919 to 14 March 1920. In 1921 De Vito joined the new group of Unitary Democracy born from the merger of the two groups of liberal democracy and social democracy. He chaired the group together with F. Cocco Ortu. De Vito was appointed minister of the navy in the first Facta cabinet. He held the post from 26 February to 1 August 1922 and continued to serve in the same post in the second Facta cabinet between 1 August to 31 October 1922.

The advent of Italian fascism put an end to De Vito's political career. However, on 20 March 1924 he was appointed senator, and five years later, on 16 March 1929, he joined the National Fascist Party. Until 7 October 1941 he was the president of the Costanzo Ciano post-telegraph insurance institute. He was also honorary president of the Council of State, president of the Higher Traffic Council, member of the Higher Council for Public Works, section president of the Central Tax Commission and economic advisor to the Italian Shipping Registry. After World War II De Vito continued to carry out activities in the legal and insurance fields.

== Personal life and death ==
De Vito married Sofia Belardi, and they had two children, a daughter and a son. He died in Rome on 13 August 1959.

=== Awards ===
De Vito was the recipient of the following:

- Knight of the Order of the Crown of Italy (27 February 1896)
- Officer of the Order of the Crown of Italy (6 March 1898)
- Commander of the Order of the Crown of Italy (9 June 1904)
- Grand Officer of the Order of the Crown of Italy (21 April 1910)
- Grand Cordon of the Order of the Crown of Italy (29 February 1920)
- Knight of the Order of Saints Maurice and Lazarus (21 January 1897)
- Officer of the Order of Saints Maurice and Lazarus (22 February 1900)
- Commander of the Order of Saints Maurice and Lazarus (29 December 1910)
- Grand Officer of the Order of Saints Maurice and Lazarus (29 December 1916)
- Grand Cordon of the Order of Saints Maurice and Lazarus (11 June 1922)
