= First Salandra government =

49th Government of Kingdom of Italy

Salandra I government
- 49th Cabinet of Italy

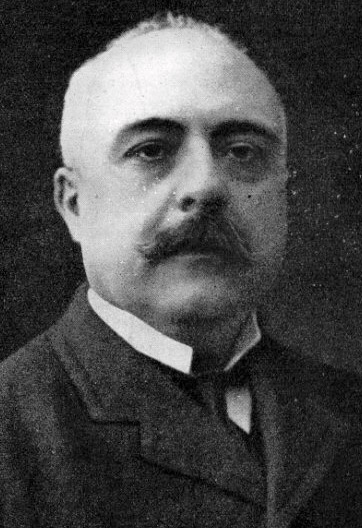
- Date formed: 21 March 1914
- Date dissolved: 5 November 1914

People and organisations
- Head of state: Victor Emmanuel III
- Head of government: Antonio Salandra
- Total no. of members: 12
- Member party: Liberals

History
- Predecessor: Giolitti IV Cabinet
- Successor: Salandra II Cabinet

The Salandra I government of Italy held office from 21 March 1914 until 5 November 1914, a total of 229 days, or 7 months and 15 days.

== Government parties ==
The government was composed by the following parties:

Party	Ideology	Leader
Liberals	Liberalism	Giovanni Giolitti

== Composition ==
Office	Name	Party	Term
Prime Minister	Antonio Salandra	Liberal	(1914–1914)
Minister of the Interior	Antonio Salandra	Liberal	(1914–1914)
Minister of Foreign Affairs	Antonino Paternò Castello	Liberal	(1914–1914)
Minister of Foreign Affairs	Antonio Salandra	Liberal	(1914–1914)
Minister of Grace and Justice	Luigi Dari	Liberal	(1914–1914)
Minister of Finance	Luigi Rava	Liberal	(1914–1914)
Minister of Treasury	Giulio Rubini	Liberal	(1914–1914)
Minister of War	Domenico Grandi	Military	(1914–1914)
Minister of War	Vittorio Italico Zupelli	Military	(1914–1914)
Minister of the Navy	Enrico Millo	Military	(1914–1914)
Minister of the Navy	Leone Viale	Military	(1914–1914)
Minister of Agriculture, Industry and Commerce	Giannetto Cavasola	Independent	(1914–1914)
Minister of Public Works	Augusto Ciuffelli	Liberal	(1914–1914)
Minister of Public Education	Edoardo Daneo	Liberal	(1914–1914)
Minister of the Colonies	Ferdinando Martini	Liberal	(1914–1914)
Minister of Post and Telegraphs	Vincenzo Riccio	Liberal	(1914–1914)
