= Dall'Oglio =

Dall'Oglio is an Italian surname. Notable people with this name include the following:

- Domenico Dall'Oglio (c. 1700–1764), Italian violinist and composer
- Jacopo Dall'Oglio (born 1992), Italian footballer
- Olivier Dall'Oglio (born 1964), French footballer and football manager
- Paolo Dall'Oglio (born 1954), Italian Jesuit priest and peace activist

== See also ==
- Lawrence Dallaglio
- Dall'Olio / Dallolio
- Dell'Olio
