= Giovanni Villa =

Italian lawyer and politician (1862–1930)

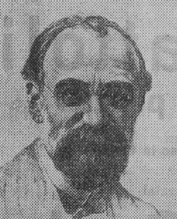
Giovanni Villa

Giovanni Villa (22 August 1862 – 25 December 1930) was an Italian lawyer and politician.

Villa was born in Corte de' Cortesi con Cignone. In November 1917 he was appointed to Allied Maritime Transport Council. He died in Rome, aged 68.
