= Luigi dell'Olio =

Italian civil engineer and transport researcher

- Education: Polytechnic University of Bari (MEng); University of Burgos (PhD)
- Known for: Bi-level optimisation models for public-transport design
- Scientific career
- Fields: Transport planning; rail transport engineering
- Workplaces: University of Cantabria

Luigi dell'Olio is an Italian civil engineer and academic. He is a full professor of Transport Engineering at the University of Cantabria in Santander, Spain, where he heads the Sustainable Mobility & Railways Engineering Research Group (SUMLAB).

== Early life and education ==
Dell'Olio graduated in civil engineering (transport specialisation) from the Polytechnic University of Bari in 2001 and obtained a master's degree in safety engineering the following year. He received a Ph.D. in civil and industrial engineering from the University of Burgos in 2005; his dissertation dealt with optimising public-transport networks.

== Academic career ==
After short research appointments in Bari, Burgos and Santander, dell'Olio joined the University of Cantabria's School of Civil Engineering as a lecturer in 2007. He became associate professor in 2009 and full professor in 2018. From November 2020 to November 2022 he served as vice-rector for research and knowledge transfer, and he returned to that portfolio in February 2025 under the incoming rector's team. Dell'Olio's work integrates stated-preference surveys, discrete-choice modelling and mathematical optimisation to inform transport policy. His 2006 article "A Bi-Level Mathematical Programming Model for Locating Bus Stops and Optimizing Frequencies" was among the first to apply bi-level optimisation to the joint design of bus-stop spacing and service frequencies. Recent projects from SUMLAB explore airport choice in multi-airport regions, the environmental rebound effects of automated vehicles and the "X-minute city" concept for active mobility.

== Selected publications ==
- dell'Olio, L., Ibeas, A., & Cecin, P. (2011). The quality of service desired by public transport users. Transport Policy, 18(1), 217-227.
- dell'Olio, L., Ibeas, A., & Cecín, P. (2010). Modelling user perception of bus transit quality. Transport Policy, 17(6), 388-397.
- Ibeas, Á., dell'Olio, L., Alonso, B., & Sainz, O. (2010). Optimizing bus stop spacing in urban areas. Transportation research part E: logistics and transportation review, 46(3), 446-458.

== Professional service ==
Dell'Olio coordinates SUMLAB and has served on the editorial boards of journals such as Transportation Research Part A and Transport Policy. He has advised regional transport authorities in Spain and Italy.
