= Enrico Millo =

Italian admiral and politician

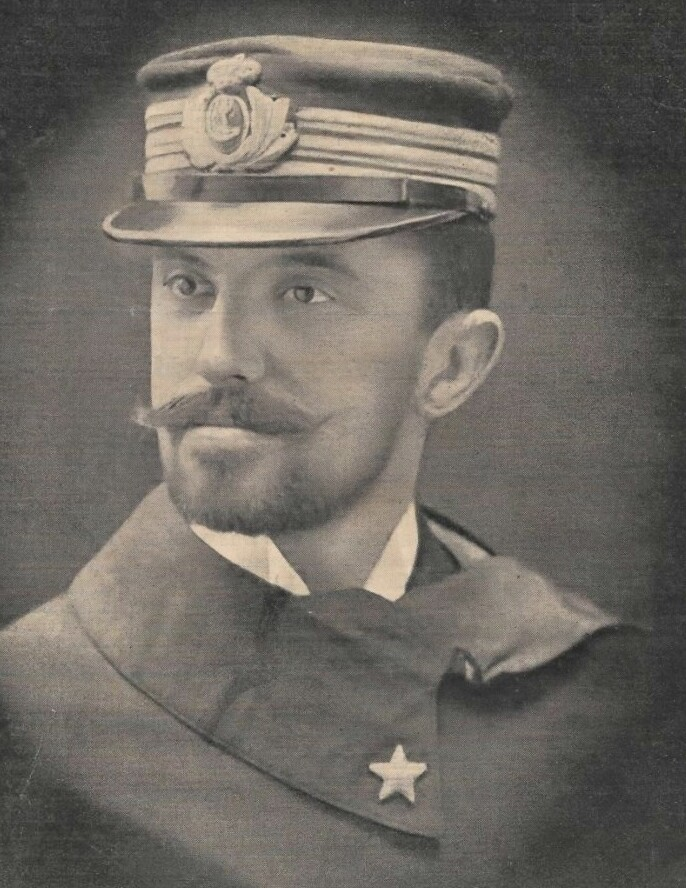
Enrico Millo c. 1912

Enrico Millo (12 February 1865 – 14 June 1930) was an Italian admiral and politician. As a naval commander, he led a raid against the Ottoman Navy in the Dardanelles in 1912.

== Life ==
Born in Chiavari, Province of Genoa, he was named guardiamarina in the Italian Regia Marina ("Royal Navy") in 1884. He participated as a navy officer in the campaigns of Kingdom of Italy in the Horn of Africa, and with the rank of capitano di vascello (ship-of-the-line captain) he led a raid by five Italian torpedo boats against the Ottoman fleet on 18 July 1912 during the Italo-Turkish War. After the expedition, he was named a senator of the Kingdom of Italy by King Victor Emmanuel III. Later he was Minister of the Navy in the Fourth Giolitti and First Salandra governments.

During World War I he held a command post in the Regia Marina, a branch of the Italian military. He was named military governor of Dalmatia during the occupation of the eastern Adriatic in the aftermath of the World War I. From 1923 to 1925 he held a managerial position in the company that owned the Port of Naples.

He died in Rome in 1930.

== Ships ==
The Cagni-class submarine Ammiraglio Millo, commissioned in 1941 during World War II, was named after him.
