= Second Salandra government =

50th Government of Kingdom of Italy

Salandra II government
- 50th Cabinet of Italy

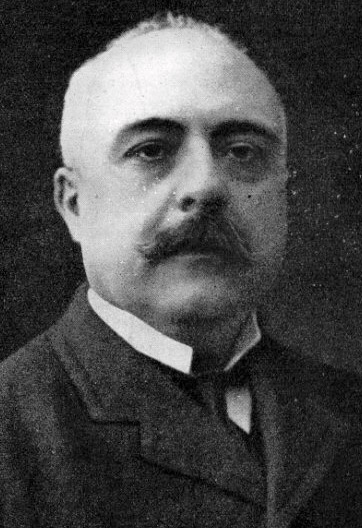
- Date formed: 5 November 1914
- Date dissolved: 18 June 1916

People and organisations
- Head of state: Victor Emmanuel III
- Head of government: Antonio Salandra
- Total no. of members: 13
- Member party: PL, PRI

History
- Predecessor: Salandra I Cabinet
- Successor: Boselli Cabinet

The Salandra II government of Italy held office from 5 November 1914 until 18 June 1916, a total of 591 days, or 1 year, 7 months and 13 days.

== Government parties ==
The government was composed by the following parties:

Party	Ideology	Leader
Liberals	Liberalism	Giovanni Giolitti
Italian Republican Party	Republicanism	Salvatore Barzilai

== Composition ==
Office	Name	Party	Term
Prime Minister	Antonio Salandra	Liberal	(1914–1916)
Minister of the Interior	Antonio Salandra	Liberal	(1914–1916)
Minister of Foreign Affairs	Sidney Sonnino	Liberal	(1914–1916)
Minister of Grace and Justice	Vittorio Emanuele Orlando	Liberal	(1914–1916)
Minister of Finance	Edoardo Daneo	Liberal	(1914–1916)
Minister of Treasury	Paolo Carcano	Liberal	(1914–1916)
Minister of War	Vittorio Italico Zupelli	Military	(1914–1916)
Minister of War	Paolo Morrone	Military	(1916–1916)
Minister of the Navy	Leone Viale	Military	(1914–1915)
Minister of the Navy	Camillo Corsi	Military	(1915–1916)
Minister of Agriculture, Industry and Commerce	Giannetto Cavasola	Independent	(1914–1916)
Minister of Public Works	Augusto Ciuffelli	Liberal	(1914–1916)
Minister of Public Education	Pasquale Grippo	Independent	(1914–1916)
Minister of the Colonies	Ferdinando Martini	Liberal	(1914–1916)
Minister of Post and Telegraphs	Vincenzo Riccio	Liberal	(1914–1916)
Minister for the Lands freed by the Enemy	Salvatore Barzilai	Republican	(1915–1916)
