= Riccardo Bianchi =

Italian engineer (1854–1936)

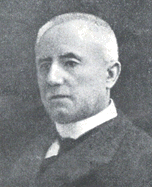
Riccardo Bianchi

Riccardo Bianchi (1854-1936) was an Italian engineer and the first Director-General of the Italian State Railways (FS), formed in 1905.

== Overview ==
Riccardo Bianchi was born at Casale Monferrato, in Piedmont on 20 August 1854. He did his studies and earned a degree in engineering in Turin and then gained practical experience in the railway workshops in Bologna where he obtained an industrial technical diploma. After graduation he worked in England for a while as a university scholar.

== Early railway career ==
In 1880 the Società per le strade ferrate dell'Alta Italia (SFAI) launched a competition for engineers. He was ranked among the first fourteen on merit and was assigned to the Fixed Material Office of the Maintenance and Works Service. At the time, the devices in use were Saxby levers and rodding that, for the control of points, required considerable muscle strength. Bianchi studied an easier mechanism and devised a hydrodynamic command and control system using water mixed with glycerin which he patented on 18 September 1883. For the construction he collaborated with Ing. Giovanni Servettaz. The first Hydrodynamic Central Apparatus in the world for the operation of points and signals thus saw the light in the Abbiategrasso railway plant on 15 October 1886. It was a 10-lever system and the results were so good that it was extended to many other installations on the Italian network, and also abroad, and was used until after the Second World War.

In 1885, the SFAI became part of Rete Mediterranea and in 1891 Bianchi was appointed head of the Maintenance and Works Department and, in 1900, Director of the Movement and Traffic Service. On 22 July 1901 he became General Manager of Rete Sicula where he remained until the establishment of the FS in 1905.

With the coming of nationalization, Bianchi was appointed General Manager of the Ferrovie dello Stato by Giovanni Giolitti. Bianchi was respected as a man of great moral integrity and an enlightened and progressive manager, who paid great attention to technological innovation and efficiency. Giolitti, in his memoirs, recalled that, when asked what salary he wanted as General Manager of Ferrovie dello Stato, Bianchi surprised him by replying that the salary he enjoyed as general director of the Sicula Network would be enough.

== Director General of the State Railways ==
Settled in his new prestigious office he had to face great problems. Most of the lines, rolling stock and plant were in a state of neglect and decay. There were different and divergent regulations and provisions. The Adriatic Network had adopted Vignoles rail and the Hardy brake, while the Mediterranean Network used double-headed rail and the Westinghouse brake. Even the couplings were of different types.

In ten years Bianchi managed to standardize the regulations and the legal status of the staff. His decisive character led him to face business problems with an entrepreneurial approach. An example was the supply of coal, of British origin, which passed through various intermediaries. Bianchi, instead, set up his own office directly in Cardiff. Mediating at the ministries he managed to promote important investments to build large locomotive repair depots and important railway lines, such as Rome-Naples and Bologna-Florence, whose construction began during his tenure.

After having designed a unified architecture for new lines, he began work on extending the tracks, then of 15,000 km, of which less than one sixth was double track. He invested much effort in the development of electric lighting of vehicles and stations. The problem of shortage of rolling stock was tackled head-on, thanks to huge financing obtained from the Government for thousands of wagons and carriages, as well as new classes of technologically advanced steam locomotives. In just one year, he managed to acquire or build 567 locomotives, 1,244 coaches and 20,623 freight wagons, in one of the greatest improvement efforts ever seen in the history of Italian infrastructure.

His management style was sometimes controversial but this was justified by the fact that a large national enterprise had been established from nothing and he had to face significant problems of amalgamation and unification among the employees. On 24 January 1915, following disputes with the Minister of Transport on the occasion of an earthquake in the Marsican territory, Bianchi resigned from his post as general manager. The Bianchi management, however, had an extremely positive effect and created a railway administration that was competitive with those of other European nations. As a result of his appointment as Director General of the FS, the Italian Railway Engineers College had appointed him as its honorary president.

== After the FS ==
Appointed Senator of the Kingdom on 23 February 1917, he was called to hold the post of Minister for Maritime Transport and Railways on 16 June 1917, but resigned on 14 May 1918. He held various other ministerial positions and was a member of the board of directors of some banks and other bodies.

He died in Turin on 4 November 1936 at the age of 82.

== Honours ==
- Gran Cordone dell'Ordine della Corona d'Italia (27 December 1908)
- Grande Ufficiale dell'Ordine dei Santi Maurizio e Lazzaro (25 January 1915)
