= Paolo Thaon di Revel =

Italian naval commander and politician

His Grace The Honourable Paolo Emilio Thaon OSSA, OSLM, OCI
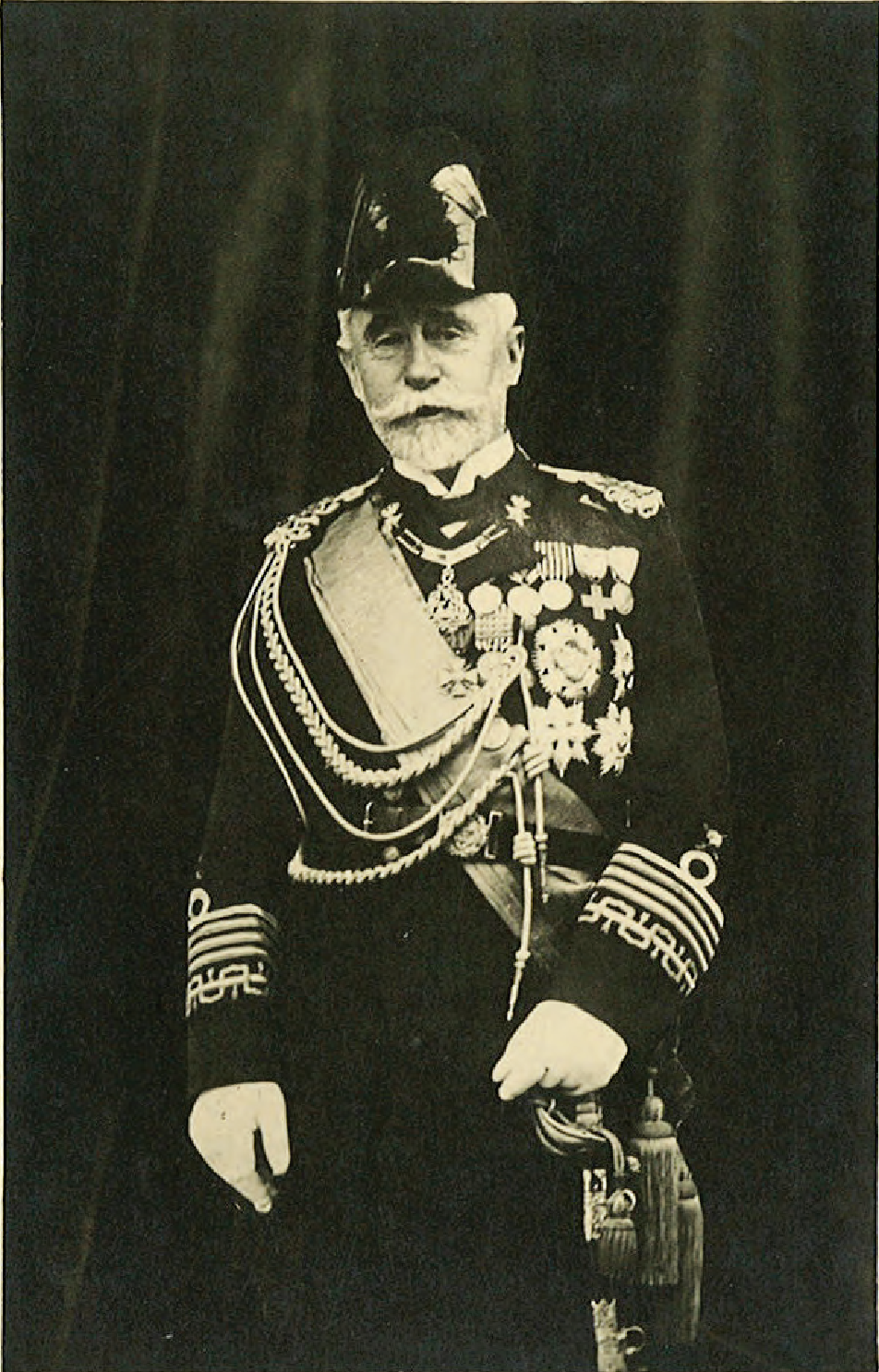
- di Revel in 1930

President of the Senate
- In office 2 August 1943 – 20 July 1944
- Monarch: Victor Emmanuel III
- Preceded by: Giacomo Suardo
- Succeeded by: Pietro Tomasi Della Torretta

Minister of Navy
- In office 31 October 1922 – 8 May 1925
- Prime Minister: Benito Mussolini
- Preceded by: Roberto De Vito
- Succeeded by: Benito Mussolini

Member of the Senate of the Kingdom
- In office 23 February 1917 – 18 June 1946
- Monarch: Victor Emmanuel III

Personal details
- Born: 10 June 1859 Turin, Kingdom of Sardinia
- Died: 24 March 1948 (aged 88) Rome, Italy
- Party: Non-partisan
- Spouse: Irene Martini di Cigala (m. 1898; died 1906)
- Children: Giovanna; Clotilde
- Education: Italian Naval Academy
- Profession: Military officer

Military service
- Allegiance: Kingdom of Italy
- Branch/service: Regia Marina
- Years of service: 1873–1926; 1936–1943
- Rank: Capitano di vascello Contrammiraglio; Viceammiraglio; Ammiraglio; Grande ammiraglio
- Battles/wars: Italo-Turkish War (1911–1912): Battle of Beirut; World War I (1915–1918): Battle of Durazzo

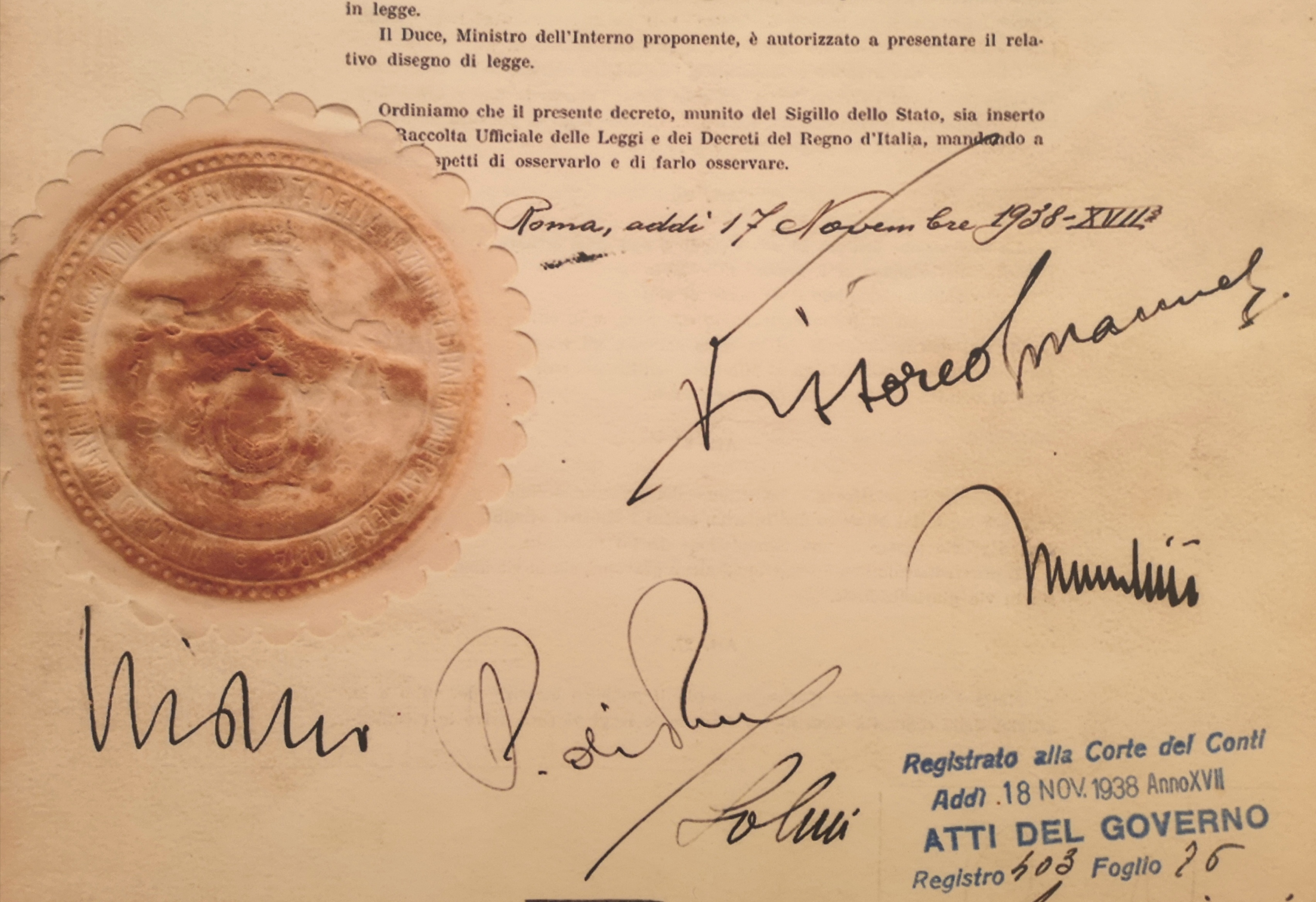
Signature of P. (Thaon) di Revel as President of the Italian Senate on the race law of 17 November 1938.

Paolo Camillo Thaon, Marquess of Revel (10 June 1859 – 24 March 1948), latterly titled with the honorary title of 1st Duke of the Sea, was an Italian admiral of the Regia Marina during World War I and later a politician.

== Early life and career ==
Thaon di Revel was born in Turin from a family of the Savoyard and Niçard nobility of Scottish descent, a younger son of Marquess and Count Ottavio Thaon di Revel and nephew of Genova Giovanni Thaon di Revel.

He took part as Rear-admiral in the Italo-Turkish War, commanding Italian cruisers in the Battle of Beirut.

He was named Chief of Staff of the Regia Marina in 1913; he supported the signing of a naval convention between the nations of the Triple Alliance, knowing of Italy's vulnerability to seaborne threats and its dependence on its sealanes, which was concluded on October of that year. When World War I broke out, he warned the government of Antonio Salandra that chances of Austro-Italian success against the combined force of the French and British fleets was small, and that the Regia Marina could not guarantee the safety of the Italian coast. This factors weighed in Salandra's decision to proclaim Italy's neutrality.

== World War I ==
When Italy joined the Entente on 24 May 1915, Thaon di Revel became the leading figure of Italy's naval war, and remained so for the duration. He resigned in October 1915 because of friction between him and the Minister of the Navy Camillo Corsi over the respective authority, and took command of the naval base of Venice. On 3 February 1917, he was reappointed Chief of Staff, and combined the position with that of Commander in Chief of the mobilized naval forces (i.e. the Regia Marina's main forces), replacing Prince Luigi Amedeo, Duke of the Abruzzi.

On one hand, Thaon di Revel was "energetic and autocratic", a tireless defender of perceived allied indifference towards Italian needs and merits and of Italian independent command, and the major reason as to why a unified Mediterranean naval command never came to be (which would have led to dangerous ambiguity had a combined fleet action been imminent), which led to a less than optimal relationship with the allied navies and officers; however, he was also "thoroughly realistic", having a picture of the Adriatic theater that discouraged aggressive actions to lure out the Austrian fleet, and which led to his decision not to risk his battleships and to fight the war with smaller ships and insidious means such as the MAS (which would score several successes in the conflict, notably the sinking of the battleship SMS Szent István). After the Italian rout at Caporetto in November 1917, he secured the coastal area. In the late days of the war he led the bombardment of Durazzo and the quick occupation of the coasts of Istria and Dalmatia.

On 6 November 1918, by initiative of the King, Thaon di Revel was promoted to the rank of Ammiraglio (full Admiral), the first in the Regia Marina since Carlo Pellion di Persano except members of the House of Savoy.

== Later life ==
In 1917 Thaon di Revel was named to the Senate of the Kingdom of Italy. In November 1921, while serving as the Chief of the Italian Naval Staff, he was Italy's naval representative to the Washington Armaments Conference.

In 1922, he was ennobled by King Victor Emmanuel III and given the victory title of 1st Duca del Mare ("Duke of the Sea"). In October 1922 he was appointed Minister of the Navy in the Mussolini Cabinet; he resigned in 1925, to protest the creation of the position of Chief of the General Staff, to be assigned exclusively to Army officers. He was named Grand Admiral (Grande Ammiraglio) on 4 November 1924. He was President of the Italian Senate from 1943 to 1944 after the fall of fascist regime.

Thaon di Revel died in Rome in 1948. He was buried in the church of Santa Maria degli Angeli e dei Martiri, next to General Armando Diaz.

== Bibliography ==
- Halpern, Paul G. (1994). A naval history of World War I. Annapolis, Md.: Naval Institute Press. ISBN 9781612511726.
- Ferrante, Ezio (2018). Il Grande Ammiraglio Paolo Thaon di Revel. Ufficio Storico della Marina Militare. ISBN 978-88-99642-15-0.

Political offices
Preceded by Giacomo Suardo	President of the Italian Senate; 1943-1944	Succeeded by Pietro Tomasi Della Torretta
Preceded by Roberto De Vito	Minister of the Navy; 1922-1925	Succeeded by Benito Mussolini
