= Nelio Dallolio =

American football coach

Coaching career (HC unless noted)
- 1948–1950: NJ State Teachers College at Glassboro

Head coaching record
- Overall: 12–6–1

Nelio Dallolio was an American college football head coach at New Jersey State Teachers College at Glassboro (now called Rowan University), an NCAA Division III program in Glassboro, New Jersey. He was the second head coach for the Profs and compiled a 12–6–1 record in three seasons (1948–1950).

== Head coaching record ==
| Year | Team | Overall | Conference | Standing | Bowl/playoffs |
|---|---|---|---|---|---|
NJ State Teachers College at Glassboro Profs (Independent) (1948–1950)
| 1948 | NJSTC at Glassboro | 4–2 | | | |
| 1949 | NJSTC at Glassboro | 4–2–1 | | | |
| 1950 | NJSTC at Glassboro | 4–2 | | | |
| NJSTC at Glassboro: | | 12–6–1 | | | |
| Total: | | 12–6–1 | | | |
