= Gaspare Colosimo =

Italian jurist and politician (1859–1940)

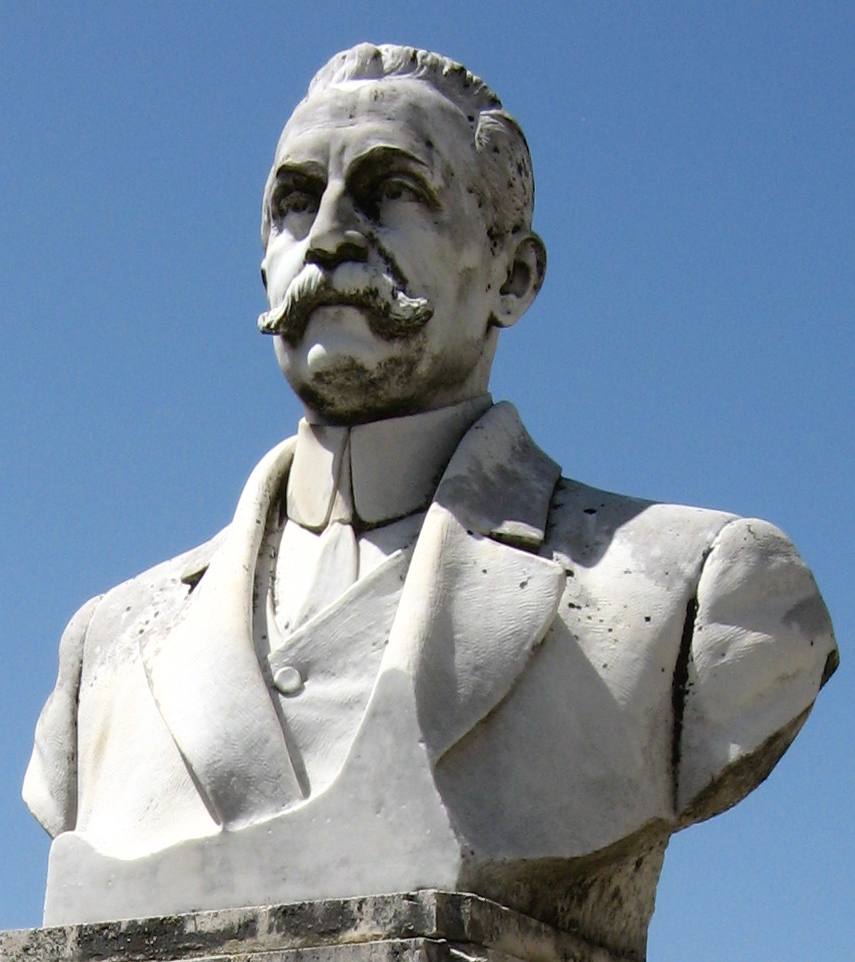
Statue of Gaspare Colosimo

Gaspare Colosimo (1859–1940) was an Italian jurist and politician who held various government posts, including minister for posts and telegraphs and minister of colonies.

== Early life and education ==
Colosimo was born in Colosimi, Cosenza, on 8 April 1859. His parents were Peter Paul, an attorney, and Artemisia Colosimo. He later earned a law degree.

== Career ==
Following his graduation Colosimo settled in Naples where he worked as a lawyer. Then he involved in politics and became a councillor and then director of the province. On 6 November 1892 he elected a deputy from the constituency of Serrastretta, province of Catanzaro, and served in the parliament until 1921. Colosimo was the minister for posts and telegraphs from 24 November 1913 to 19 March 1914. Next he was the minister of colonies between 19 June 1916 and 23 June 1919 in the cabinets of Paolo Boselli and then of Vittorio Emanuele Orlando. Colosimo replaced Ferdinando Martini as minister of colonies. When he was in office he developed a program for Italian colonies which focused on East Africa in general and Ethiopia in particular. It was the first official document which clearly articulated the colonial goals of the Italian Empire. Then he served as the deputy prime minister and minister of interior from 9 March to 23 June 1919 in the cabinet led by Vittorio Emanuele Orlando. In 1924 Colosimo was elected as a senator.

== Personal life and death ==
Colosimo was married, and one of his children died young. He died in 1940.
