= Gaetano Giardino =

Italian general (1864–1935)

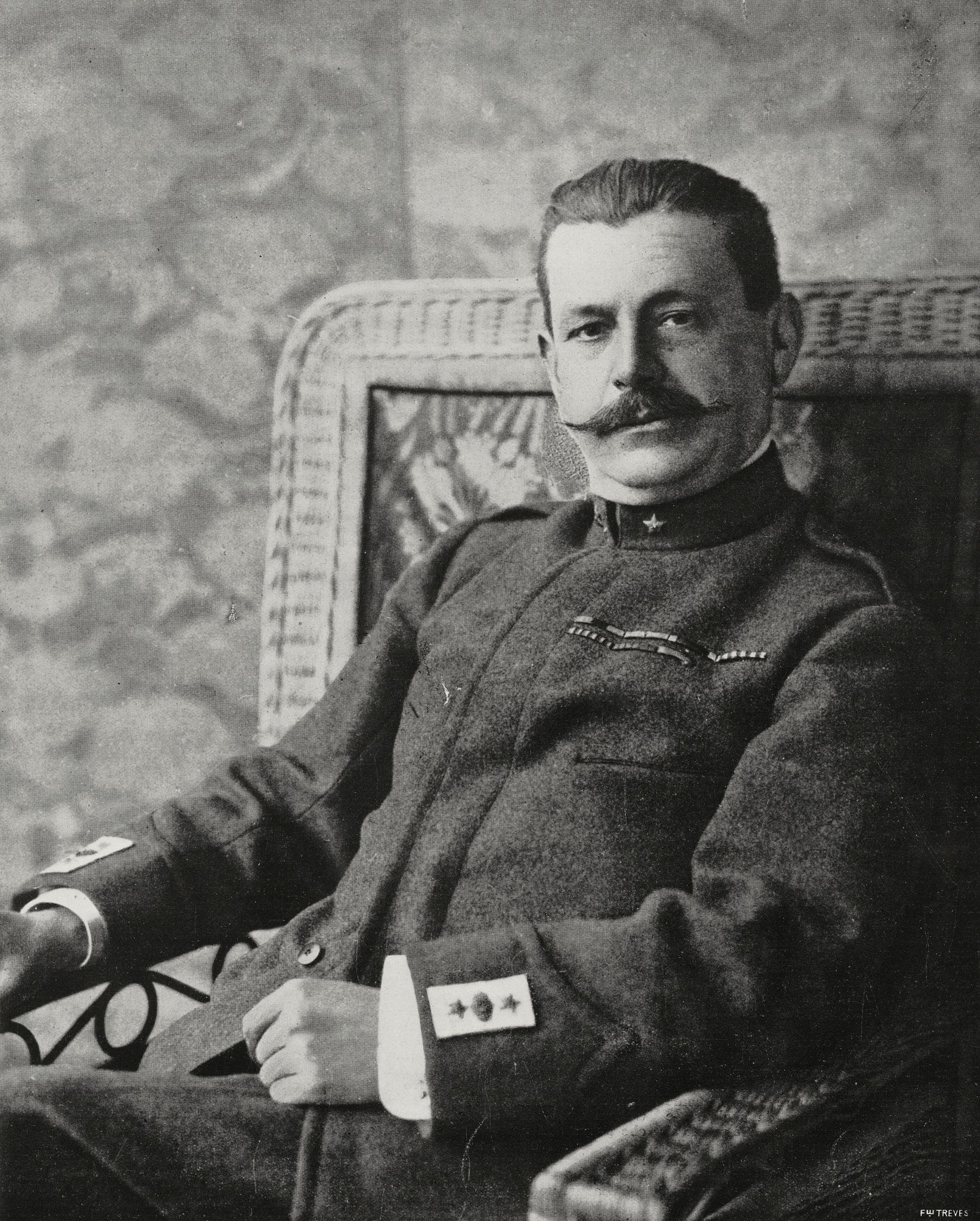
General Giardino

Gaetano Giardino (24 January 1864 – 21 November 1935) was an Italian soldier who rose to the rank of Marshal of Italy and Italian Representative to the Allied War Council during World War I.

== Life ==
Born in Montemagno, he attended the Royal Military Academy of Modena, being appointed Lieutenant of 8th Bersaglieri Regiment. In the late 1880s he joined the Italian forces that were fighting in Eritrea and Sudan and in 1894 he fought in Kassala. He was later named captain and became a company commander of 6th Bersaglieri Regiment. In the early years of the 20th century he was named chief of the staff of two different Italian divisions; then, at the outbreak of the Italo-Turkish War, he was named sottocapo di Stato Maggiore (deputy chief of staff) of the Italian expeditionary forces.

== World War I ==
In the spring of 1915, when Italy declared war on Austria-Hungary, he was named chief of the staff of the IV Army Corps then of the II Army Corps. He later assumed the duty of commander of the 48th Division, then he was named commander of two different Army Corps. After the Battle of Caporetto and the subsequent changes in Italian highest military positions, he became a close adviser of Armando Diaz with the duty to maintain the relations with the other Triple Entente powers. In April 1918 he was named commander of the 4th Army, a.k.a. the Army of Monte Grappa. In the Battle of Solstizio his army was able to stop the Austrian offensive. During the Battle of Vittorio Veneto the troops under Giardino's leadership were the first Italian troops to attack the Austrian front in order to force them to use their reserve troops against the Italians on Monte Grappa, facilitating the attack along the Piave River that took place three days later. After the armistice of Villa Giusti, Giardino’s 4th was disbanded.

== Later life ==
Between 1923 and 1924, he was named governor of the free state of Fiume. In 1926 he was promoted to the rank of Marshal of Italy. He died in Turin in 1935 and he is buried together with his soldiers in the war cemetery of Monte Grappa. A monument in his honor has been erected in Bassano del Grappa.
