= Senate of the Kingdom of Italy =

Legislative body of the Kingdom of Italy from 1861 until 1947

Senate of the Kingdom of Italy Senato del Regno d'Italia
- Emblem of the Royal Senate

Type
- Type: Upper house of the Parliament of the Kingdom of Italy

History
- Founded: 18 February 1861
- Disbanded: 7 November 1947
- Preceded by: Subalpine Senate
- Succeeded by: Senate of the Republic
- Seats: Variable

Elections
- Voting system: No elections Members appointed by the King on the advice of the Council of Ministers, with male members of the Royal Family serving as ex officio members

Meeting place
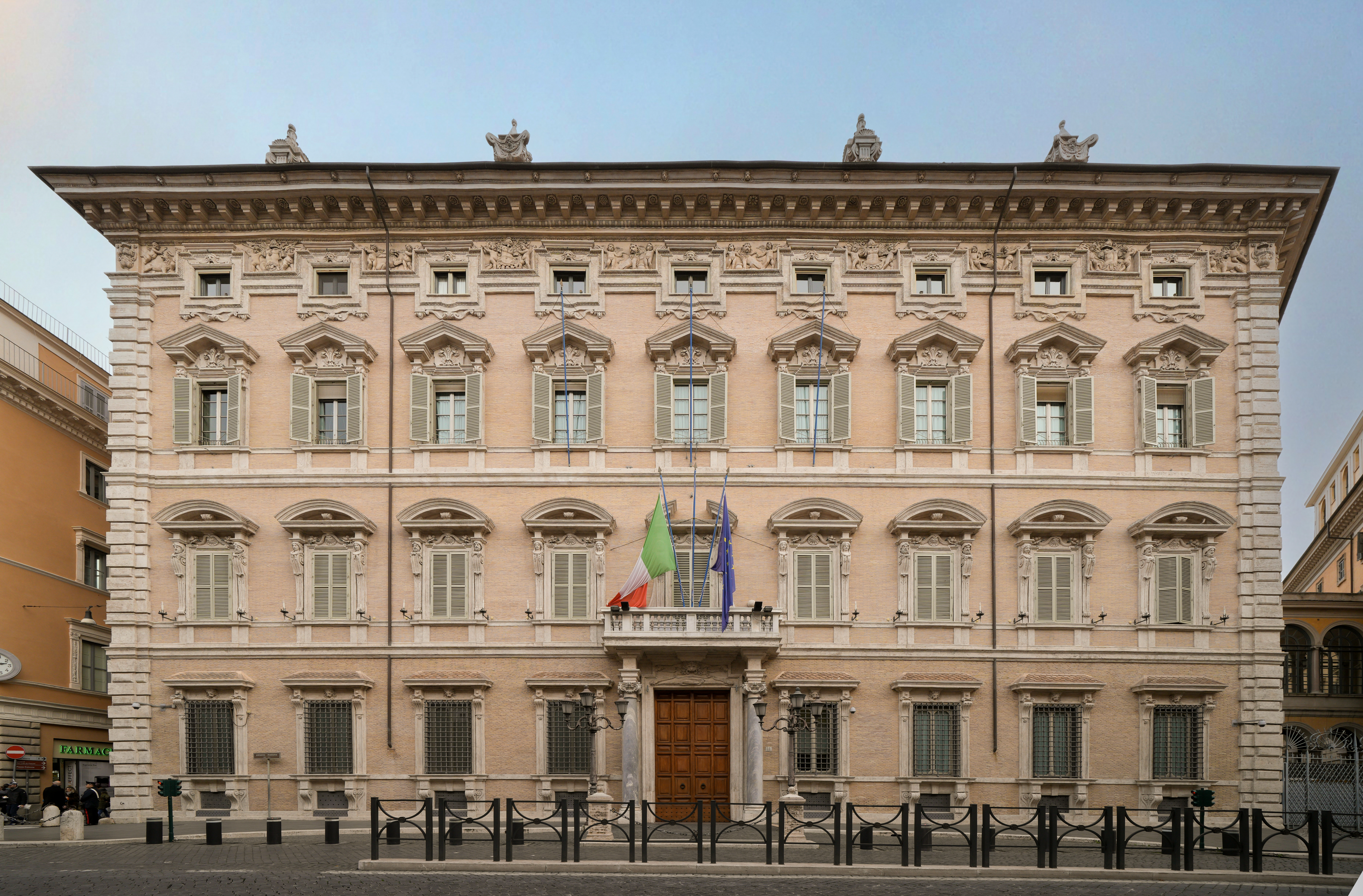
- Palazzo Madama, Rome

The Senate of the Kingdom of Italy (Italian: Senato del Regno d'Italia) was the upper house of the bicameral parliament of the Kingdom of Italy, officially created on 4 March 1848, acting as an evolution of the original Subalpine Senate. It was replaced on 1 January 1948 by the present-day Senate of the Republic. All of its members were appointed by the monarch.

== History ==
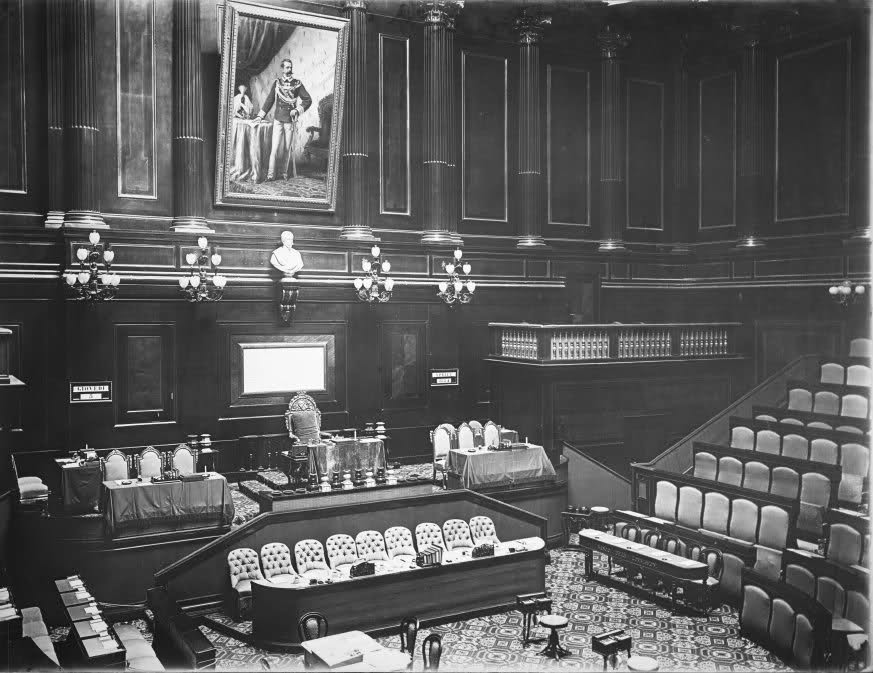
Chamber of the Senate in 1884

The Senate of the Kingdom of Italy rose to national prominence in 1860, following the Unification of Italy, as the direct successor of the Subalpine Senate of the Kingdom of Sardinia, with the addition of members drawn from the territories obtained during the Second Italian War of Independence and the Expedition of the Thousand.

The Senate was initially based at the Palazzo Madama in Turin until 1864, when it was moved to the Palazzo Vecchio in Florence. Finally, in 1871, it was moved to the Palazzo Madama in Rome.

During the fascist regime, there was no "fascistisation" (fascistizzazione) of the Senate equivalent to that carried out in the lower house. Members of the Senate appointed before the March on Rome, such as Luigi Einaudi and Benedetto Croce, retained their seats in the Senate. However, in 1939, when the lower house was transformed into the Chamber of Fasces and Corporations, 211 new members were added to the Senate. When Fascism fell on 25 July 1943, King Victor Emmanuel III appointed the Marquess of Revel as the president of the Senate, who entered office on 2 August 1943.

On 20 July 1944, Pietro Tomasi Della Torretta was appointed as the final president of the Senate, an office which he retained until 25 June 1946. In August 1944, all "Senators responsible for maintaining Fascism and enabling the war, through their votes and their individual actions, including propaganda carried out within or without the Senate" were dismissed from office.

=== Transformation into the Senate of the Republic ===
Following the 1946 institutional referendum and the election of the Constituent Assembly, the Senate of the Kingdom ceased to function on 25 June 1946. It was formally suppressed on 7 November 1947, thus bringing the Senate to extinction, although in fact it had lost almost all its limited power during the final years of the Fascist government. During the Fascist period, the Senate contained several Fascist members, but because senators held office for life, it had remained somewhat outside the Party's state system and so, over time, it was pushed ever further to the margins of political life.

The Senate of the Kingdom was the inspiration for the current Senate of the Republic, which came into existence on 1 January 1948. The present-day Italian Senate still has members for life appointed by the head of state; however, unlike in the Kingdom, such members hold just five seats, with the other 200 being reserved for senators elected by universal direct suffrage.

== Structure ==
The king appointed the senators of the Kingdom ad vitam (for life). They were entitled to slightly higher honours than the elected deputies of the lower house. In time, although remaining formally a royal power, the appointment of senators came to be carried out largely on the recommendations of the prime minister, who was always in a position to influence the decisions of the king and to enhance support for the government in the Senate through the appointment of "batches" of senators. Under Article 33 of the Albertine Statute, the number of senators was not limited, but they had to be over forty years of age and drawn from one of the following categories:

1. Archbishops and Bishops of the state;
2. The President of the Chamber of Deputies;
3. Members of the Chamber of Deputies who had served in three legislatures or for more than six years;
4. Ministers of State;
5. Undersecretaries of State;
6. Ambassadors;
7. Ministers Plenipotentiary, who had served for more than three years;
8. First Presidents and Presidents of the Court of Cassation and the Court of Audit;
9. First Presidents of the Court of Appeal;
10. The Advocate General of the Court of Cassation, and the Prosecutor General, after they had served for five years;
11. Presidents of the Class of Magistrates of the courts of appeal, who had served for more than three years;
12. Members of the Court of Cassation and the Court of Audit, after 5 years
13. Advocates general and fiscal, after 5 years
14. General officers of land and sea, although major-generals and rear admirals had to have served for more than five years at that rank;
15. Councillors of State who had served for more than five years;
16. Division councillors who had served three terms as council president;
17. Intendant generals who had served over seven years;
18. Members of the Accademia nazionale delle scienze after seven years of membership;
19. Ordinary members of the Higher Council for Public Education, after seven years in office
20. Anyone who had glorified the nation through outstanding service or merit;
21. Anyone who paid three thousand lira in import taxes over a period of three years on their own property or company.

Male members of the royal family were members of the Senate ex officio and sat immediately behind the president of the Senate. They began to attend the Senate once they reached twenty-one years of age and were allowed to vote once they reached twenty-five.

== See also ==
- Subalpine Senate

== Bibliography ==
- (in Italian) Francesco Bartolotta (ed), Parlamenti e governi d'Italia dal 1848 al 1970, Roma, Vito Bianco Ed., 1971.
- Archivio Storico del Senato della Repubblica. "Senatori dell'Italia Liberale dal 01/04/1861 al 16/10/1922". I Senatori d'Italia (in Italian).
