= Domenico Grandi =

Italian general and politician

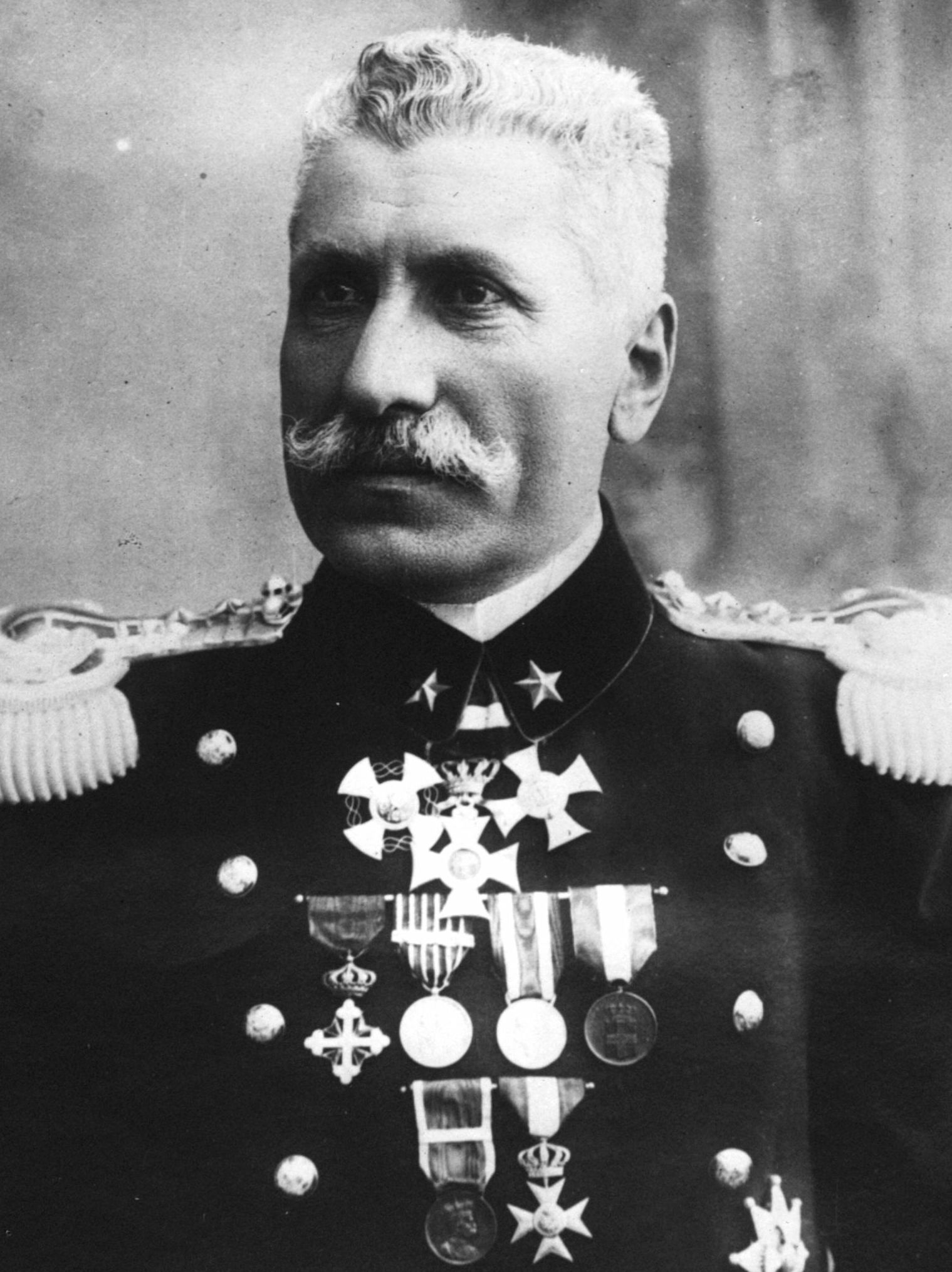

Minister of War
- In office 21 March 1914 – 10 October 1914
- Preceded by: Paolo Spingardi
- Succeeded by: Vittorio Italico Zupelli

Senator
- In office 29 March 1914 – 22 January 1937

Member of the Chamber of Deputies
- In office 23 November 1892 – 2 March 1897

Domenico Grandi (Corinaldo, 14 November 1849 – Corinaldo, 22 January 1937) was an Italian general and politician. He was a Minister of War of the Kingdom of Italy.

== Early life and career ==
Domenico Grandi came from a prosperous family originating in the Marche that had no military tradition. He began his education under the Jesuits before deciding to pursue a military career. He entered the Military Academy of Modena on 2 November. 1867, graduating on 22 August 1869 as a second lieutenant. He took part in the capture of Rome. In July 1871 he was awarded a civil decoration for the relief work he carried out following the flooding of the Tiber in December 1870.

After teaching in Modena and serving in Palermo, on 31 December 1872 he enrolled at the Royal Academy of Turin. On 4 November 1875 he was appointed lieutenant and, on 26 August. 1877, he was moved to the general staff. On 10 March 1879 he was appointed a staff officer at the general secretariat of the Ministry of War, and was soon promoted to captain.

He was entrusted with receiving and accompanying the mission that arrived in Italy from Shewa for the final agreements relating to the Treaty of Wuchale and the delivery of 10,000 rifles that Italy was supposed to send to Menelik II. He accompanied Makonnen Wolde Mikael on the return journey from Rome, passing through Jerusalem, and participated in the "Tigrina" expedition of General Baldassarre Orero from Massawa to Adwa.

He was elected deputy for the Senigallia constituency in the XVIII and XIX legislatures (1892-97). He ultimately lost his seat as a result of remaining loyal to the outgoing Prime Minister Francesco Crispi. After 1897, Grandi turned away from politics and in his military career saw a succession of promotions to major general (16 November 1900) and lieutenant general (16 February 1908). He was assigned to various posts, culminating in September 1911 in the command of the X Army Corps of Naples.

== Appointment as Minister ==
In March 1914 Prime Minister Giovanni Giolitti resigned and was replaced by the more conservative Antonio Salandra, who immediately set about filling ministerial posts. Finding a minister of war did not prove easy. The armed forces were heavily depleted by the war in Libya, and as Europe seemed to be heading towards a major war, the task of an incoming minister was daunting.

Salandra first offered the role to General it:Carlo Porro, but he made his acceptance conditional on the provision of six hundred million lire for expenditure strengthening Italy’s armed forces over several years. This was the same amount as the outgoing minister of war, Paolo Spingardi, had already specified. Salandra responded that the state had to take on only expenditure that was within its means, so Porro declined. Alfredo Dallolio was also approached, and also turned Salandra down for similar reasons to Porro.

To serve as minister of war, Salandra needed a high-ranking officer, reliably deferential to the monarchy, untainted by links to Giolitti, but with some political ability. In this context Grandi’s name was suggested as an alternative by Ugo Brusati, aide-de-camp to king Vittorio Emanuele III, who knew him personally. Grandi claimed he accepted the nomination because he was "blackmailed" by Salandra who threatened to resign as Prime Minister if he would not accept, and in any case he only demanded a guarantee of two hundred thousand lire before he agreed.

== Period of office ==
In March 1914 Grandi found the armed forces in a poor state owing to the continuing hostilities in Libya. Despite its lack of combat readiness, Italy had just signed a new military convention on 11 March 1914 with its allies in the Triple Alliance. The agreement provided for the transfer of the Italian 3rd Army, approximately 150,000 men, to Alsace between on the eighth and twentieth days after mobilization, beginning war operations within three days in collaboration with the German army.

On 1 July 1914, three days after the assassination of Archduke Franz Ferdinand, the Italian Chief of Staff General Alberto Pollio died of a heart attack. Grandi met with it:Luigi Zuccari, Roberto Brusati and Luigi Cadorna to consider candidates to replace him. Settimio Piacentini and Cadorna each received two votes on a secret ballot, with Cadorna voting for himself. The king broke the tie by endorsing Cadorna, appointing him Chief of Staff on 27 July. In the meantime, without consulting its ally Italy, Austria-Hungary had issued Serbia with an ultimatum on 24 July, bringing the continent closer to war.

On 2 August 1914, the day after Germany declared war on Russia, Salandra called an emergency cabinet meeting. Grandi agreed with Finance Minister Giulio Rubini that Italy was nowhere near ready for war. Grandi shared with his colleagues the assessment of Cadorna, in post for only one week - only two out of seventeen army corps were at full strength, less than half the army even had a uniform, and while 90,000 officers were required for a general mobilisation, the army had only 26,000. Because of the long-standing Triple Alliance, Italy had no military plans for an invasion of Austria-Hungary. The cabinet determined that Italy should remain neutral for the time being, and made a public announcement accordingly.

This announcement took Cadorna completely by surprise, as he was expecting Italy to enter the war shortly on the side of Austria-Hungary and Germany. This was the first example of the lack of coordination between political and military decision-making which infuriated Cadorna and made him deeply distrust politicians. Cadorna quickly became frustrated in his dealings with Grandi too, because the minister of war frequently declined his requests for more arms and equipment on the grounds of needing to keep costs under control.

== End of office ==
Through August and September, Cadorna applied pressure for Italy to mobilise before winter set in, but Salandra wanted more time for negotiations to ensure Italy secured the greatest advantage from going to war, and Grandi continued to stall. In mid-September the interventionists, led by Corriere della Sera launched a campaign against Foreign Minister San Giuliano and Grandi.

On 30 September, Salandra wrote to the king with unfavourable comments about San Giuliano and Grandi towards G. and the resignation of the undersecretary of War, General Giulio Cesare Tassoni, was interpreted by observers as indicating the involvement of Cadorna himself in undermining Grandi. Salandra eventually gave in to Cadorna and pushed Grandi to resign on 8 October 1914. A few days later on 16 October 1914l San Giuliano died and Salandra carried out a complete reshuffle of the government, in order to have a cabinet more willing to prepare for war.

== Later military career ==
After his resignation Grandi returned to serving in the army as commander of the X Army Corps. On 5 June 1915, Italy went to war and he was then under the authority of Cadorna who had effectively ousting him from the ministry. he had non-prominent roles; in that 1915, as partial consolation, he obtained the cross of the Military Order of Savoy for his role in operations on the Karst plateau and the medal of the Order of Saints Maurice and Lazarus for fifty years of service.

When the opportunity arose for Cadorna to sideline Grandi the X Army Corps was assigned to the 3rd Army rather than to the more important 2nd Army. However, Grandi took part in the first, second and third battles of the Isonzo. His unit was then moved to the rear until May 1916, when it was moved to the 1st Army, on the Trentino front, where in June it withstood attack during the battle of Asiago. At the end of December 1916 Grandi was transferred from the X to the XIV reserve army corps. On 7 March 1917 he was released from this command and, in April, sent to command the territorial army corps of Verona. On 14 November he was placed in an auxiliary position and on 1 June 1917 on leave.

This was the end of Grandi’s military career. He lived for another twenty years: politically he did not have any great enthusiasm towards the fascist regime; he was also among the senior generals who opposed Antonino Di Giorgio's plans for the reorganisation of the army.

Dino Grandi, minister under Mussolini, was unrelated to him.

== Honours ==
Cavaliere di Gran Croce decorato di Gran Cordone dell'Ordine dei Santi Maurizio e Lazzaro - ribbon for ordinary uniform

Grand Cordon of the Order of Saints Maurice and Lazarus

Cavaliere di Gran Croce decorato di Gran Cordone dell'Ordine della Corona d'Italia - ribbon for ordinary uniform

Grand Cordon of the Order of the Crown of Italy

Cavaliere di Gran Croce decorato di Gran Cordone dell'Ordine coloniale della Stella d'Italia - ribbon for ordinary uniform

Grand Cordon of the Colonial Order of the Star of Italy

Commendatore dell'Ordine militare di Savoia - ribbon for ordinary uniform

Commander of the Military Order of Savoy
