= Melotti =

Melotti is a surname. Notable people with the surname include:

- Carlo Melotti (1882–1958), Italian general during World War II
- Elaine Melotti Schmidt, American educator, philanthropist, art curator and collector
- Fausto Melotti (1901–1986), Italian sculptor, ceramicist, poet, and theorist
