= Antonino Di Giorgio =

Italian general and politician

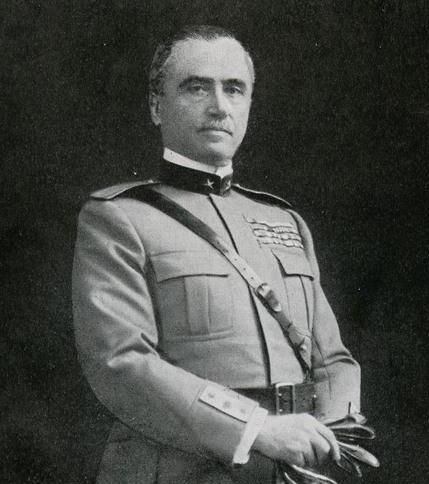

Minister of War
- In office 30 April 1924 – 4 April 1925
- Preceded by: Armando Diaz
- Succeeded by: Benito Mussolini
- Member of the Chamber of Deputies of the Kingdom of Italy
- In office 27 November 1913 – 7 April 1921
- Member of the Chamber of Deputies of the Kingdom of Italy
- In office 24 May 1924 – 5 March 1928

Personal details
- Born: 22 September 1867 San Fratello, Kingdom of Italy
- Died: 17 April 1932 (aged 64) Palermo, Kingdom of Italy
- Party: National Fascist Party

Military service
- Allegiance: Kingdom of Italy
- Branch/service: Royal Italian Army
- Rank: Lieutenant General
- Battles/wars: First Italo-Abyssinian War; Battle of Adwa; Italo-Turkish War; World War I; Battle of Asiago; Battle of Mount Ortigara; Battle of Caporetto; First Battle of the Piave; Second Battle of the Piave; Battle of Vittorio Veneto
- Awards: Silver Medal of Military Valor; Bronze Medal of Military Valor (twice); War Merit Cross; Military Order of Savoy

Antonino Di Giorgio (San Fratello, 22 September 1867 – Palermo, 17 April 1932) was an Italian general and politician, who fought in the First Italo-Ethiopian War, the Italo-Turkish War and the First World War, and served as Minister of War of the Kingdom of Italy from April 1924 to April 1925. He resigned after the rejection of his plan for a radical reform of the Royal Italian Army.

== Biography ==
=== Early life and campaigns in Africa ===
He was born in San Fratello into a family of the Sicilian landed nobility, the son of Baroness Giuseppina Faraci and of notary Ignazio Di Giorgio. He was admitted to the Nunziatella Military School in Naples first, and later to the Military Academy of Modena, graduating with the rank of infantry second lieutenant in the summer of 1888 and being assigned to the 77th Infantry Regiment in Pescara. In 1895 he passed the exams for admission to the War School, but before entering it he was reached by the news of the defeat at Amba Alagi, and decided to volunteer for service in Eritrea. He thus fought in the second phase of the First Italo-Abyssinian War, being decorated with two bronze medals for military valor for his conduct during the battle of Adwa and during a later clash in May 1896. Having been repatriated due to an illness he had contracted, he resumed his studies at the War School, qualifying as a staff officer. He was promoted to captain and assigned to the VIII Corps based in Florence, where he obtained promotion to major in 1907.

With that rank, he assumed command of a small infantry unit, which led to a series of victories in Somalia against the tribes of the country's interior. Between 11 and 12 July 1908 he captured the city of Merca, subsequently clashing with the Somali rebels in Merére and occupying Afgoi. Following these successes, the Sultan of Ghelédi submitted to the Italian colonial government together with 5,000 soldiers. In 1909, however, Di Giorgio was repatriated after being criticized for his excessive harshness by the civil governor of Somalia, Tommaso Carletti, who was at odds with him due to the different views they held over the methods for the conquest of territory (Carletti favoured a progressive and diplomatic approach through agreements and compromises with local chiefs, whereas Di Giorgio advocated for the use of military force) and accused him of having destroyed entire villages and committed indiscriminate massacres.

The outbreak of the Italo-Turkish war, in 1911, found Major Di Giorgio in command of a battalion of the 89th Infantry Regiment "Salerno", at the command of which he returned to Africa for the last time. The successes of the operation carried out under his command earned him promotion to lieutenant colonel, as well as the Military Order of Savoy and the silver medal for military valor. The popularity he had gained in Messina, his homeland, prompted him to pursue a political career upon his return to Italy after the end of the war; in 1913 he ran as an independent candidate, with a nationalist and anti-Giolittian program, and was elected to the Italian Chamber of Deputies, being later re-elected in the XXIV, XXV and XXVII legislatures.

In parliament, Di Giorgio mostly dealt with problems of military nature; he argued the need to shift the center of gravity of the Italian armed forces from the north to the south of the country, and from the land to the sea. Such positions had as a military rationale the new role that Italy should have assumed in the Mediterranean in relation to the acquisition of Libya; as well as the need to provide economic support to the disadvantaged areas of the country, with particular emphasis on those of Messina, which still suffered from the destructive consequences of the 1908 earthquake, in which he had lost his father.

=== First World War ===
He was held in high esteem by General Luigi Cadorna, who gave him a post at the Supreme Command at the outbreak of hostilities with Austria-Hungary in May 1915. Not long afterwards, however, Di Giorgio obtained at his request an operational command, and was made Chief of Staff of the VIII Corps (2nd Army). He was promoted colonel in 1915, and to brigadier in 1916. With this rank he assumed command of the Bisagno Brigade (209th and 210th Infantry Regiments), a new unit built with recruits of the 1896 class, and framed in the X Army Corps, part of the 1st Army and assigned to the Trentino area. In July 1916 the brigade launched a series of bloody and unsuccessful attacks on the strongly fortified Austro-Hungarian positions on the Cimone di Arsiero and Spitz di Tonezza, on the Asiago plateau. Later that year, Di Giorgio was appointed commander of the IV Alpini Group. The group, framed in the 52nd Alpine Division (XX Army Corps, 6th Army), participated in the operations aimed at avoiding new breakthroughs of the Asiago plateau and later fought in the battle of Mount Ortigara. After promotion to major general, he was given command of the 51st Division in Valsugana (XVIII Corps, 1st Army).

He was caught in Rome, where he had gone to attend a session of the Chamber of Deputies, by news of the Caporetto disaster; immediately recalled by Cadorna, he left for Udine, where he assumed command of the Special Army Corps, a hastily formed unit tasked with stemming the advance of the Austro-Hungarians on the Tagliamento and covering the retreat of the Second Army. Di Giorgio led his troops against the tide of the stream of stragglers who retreated from Caporetto, and his men held the Austro-Hungarians at bay from 26 October to 3 November in Battle of Ragogna, until the Corps was almost completely destroyed. On 9 November Di Giorgio retreated beyond the Piave, and on the following day the Special Army Corps was formally dissolved. Di Giorgio was then promoted to lieutenant general and replaced Pietro Badoglio in command of the XXVII Corps (Reggio, Campania, Cuneo and Messina infantry brigades). At the command of this unit he participated in the defense of Monte Grappa, in the second battle of the Piave and in the battle of Vittorio Veneto.

After the end of the war he returned to political life, and in the following years he supported the annexation of Fiume by Italy, albeit siding against D'Annunzio's occupation of the city, which he saw as a symptom of declining discipline in the Army. In 1919 Di Giorgio was re-elected with a right-wing list, but in 1921 he decided not to run again, disappointed by the situation in Italy, and he retired to private life for some time. On 6 February 1922 he married the English-born aristocrat Norina Whitaker.

=== Minister of War ===
Initially an opponent of Fascism, he changed his mind after the union between fascists and nationalists in 1923, and owing to the persuasion by his friends Luigi Federzoni and Biagio Pace. He then ran at the 1924 elections, together with liberals such as Vittorio Emanuele Orlando, in the Fascist list, and was elected again to the Chamber of Deputies. Mussolini, who saw him as a general both appreciated by the Army and the king and favourable towards Fascism, immediately appointed him Minister of War, replacing Armando Diaz, whose health was deteriorating. He held office from 30 April 1924 to 4 April 1925. During his tenure Di Giorgio defended the autonomy of the Army, forbade officers from becoming involved in politics and tried to limit the role of the MVSN; at the same time, he supported Mussolini during the political crisis sparked by the murder of Giacomo Matteotti, even providing the MVSN with a hundred thousand rifles.

In 1925 he presented a proposal for a substantial reform of the Army. His organizational doctrine envisioned the formation of stable and small-sized groups of permanent armed units, to be enlarged as needed; as the upkeep of a peacetime Army of 125 regiments represented a serious drain on the Army’s funds, leaving little to spare for weapons and equipment (in the early 1920s, an Italian infantry battalion only had eight machine guns, as opposed to the fifty-two fielded by a French infantry battalion), Di Giorgio had proposed to divide the yearly draft class (around 230,000 new recruits every year) in two groups, of which one, the minority, would carry out eighteen months of military service and be employed to establish regiments that would be kept in full readiness for the entire year (with priority given to Alpini regiments deployed at the borders), whereas the remainder, the majority, would be discharged after completing three months of training, and their regiments reduced to cadres that in case of war could be quickly reactivated by recalling the troops into service. In Di Giorgio's view, this sizeable reduction of the peacetime army would not negatively impact its readiness and would free up funds that would then be used to improve the armament and equipment. Di Giorgio's ideas, however, were not appreciated by the regime, committed to propagating the need for an extensive militarization of the Italian people; the High Council of the Army (composed of the Duke of Aosta, Luca Montuori, Enrico Caviglia, Giulio Cesare Tassoni, Gaetano Giardino, Carlo Petitti di Roreto and Giuseppe Francesco Ferrari) rejected the reform, which also entailed a reduction of the powers of the High Council of the Army in favour of the Chief of Staff, and Generals Luigi Cadorna, Gaetano Giardino, Enrico Caviglia, Vittorio Zupelli and Giulio Cesare Tassoni and Admiral Paolo Thaon di Revel all harshly opposed the proposal in parliament. The liberal and left-wing parties also opposed the reform, as they feared that the downsizing of the Army would result in the MVSN gaining more importance. Di Giorgio, who had stated that he would resign from his post as Minister if his reform would be rejected, kept his promise and returned to active service in the Army, commanding the Army Corps of Florence and then that of Palermo in 1926.

=== Final years ===
In 1927 Di Giorgio came into conflict with the prefect of Palermo, Cesare Mori, defending some notables placed under investigation by the "iron prefect" (including his brother) and contesting the methods used by Mori for the repression of the mafia in Sicily. He protested with Mussolini, but the latter sided with Mori and even blocked his promotion to army general. On 5 March 1928, now in open conflict with the regime and hit by personal attacks, Di Giorgio resigned as a deputy in protest and retired from active service.

He died suddenly on 17 April 1932 of a heart attack that struck him while he was recovering from a surgical operation.
