= Brusati =

Brusati is a surname. Notable people with the surname include:

- Franco Brusati (1922–1993), Italian regisseur
- Giancarlo Brusati (1910–2001), Italian fencer
- Roberto Brusati (1850-1935), Italian military commander and senator
