= 6th Infantry Division "Cuneo" =

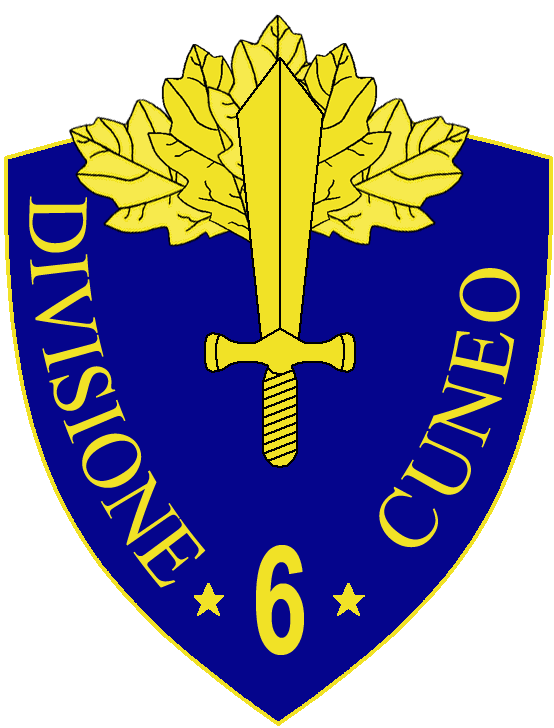
- 6th Infantry Division "Cuneo" insignia
- Active: 1939–1943
- Country: Kingdom of Italy
- Branch: Royal Italian Army
- Type: Infantry
- Size: Division
- Garrison/HQ: Milan
- Engagements: World War II

Commanders
- Notable commanders: Carlo Melotti

Insignia
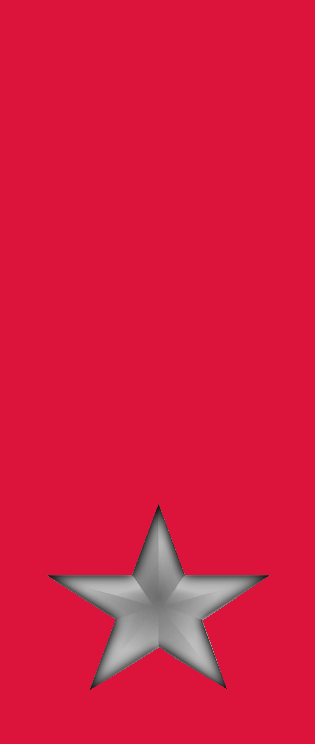
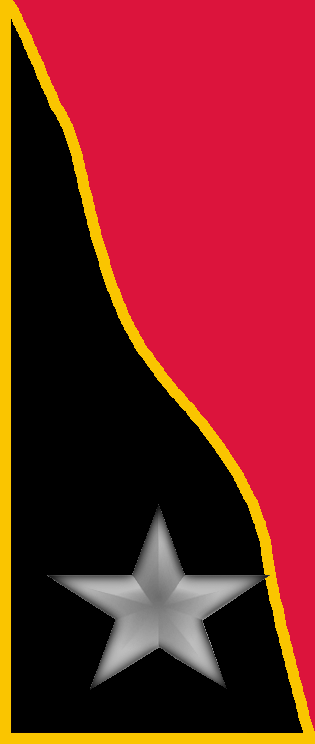
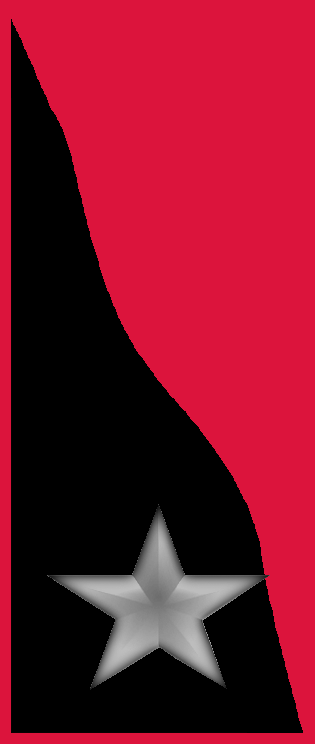
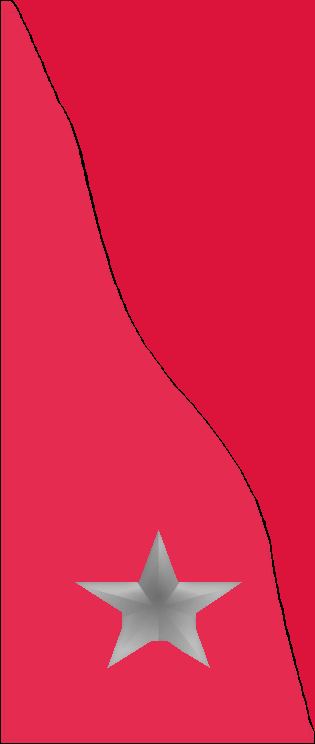
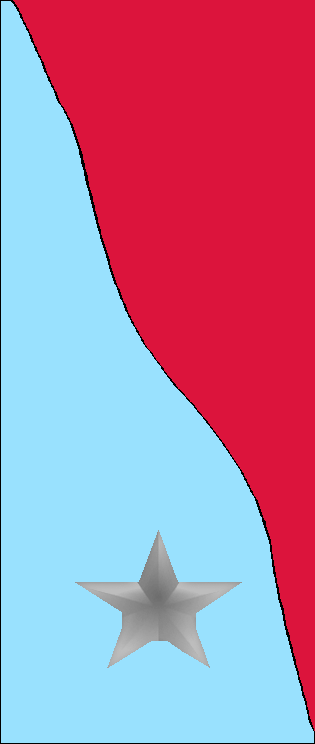
- Identification symbol: Cuneo Division gorget patches

The 6th Infantry Division "Cuneo" (Italian: 6ª Divisione di fanteria "Cuneo") was an infantry division of the Royal Italian Army during World War II. The Cuneo was formed on 24 May 1939 in Milan by splitting the 58th Infantry Division "Legnano" and was named for the city of Cuneo. The Cuneo was part of the III Corps of First Army that took part in the Italian invasion of France, and then it was part of the XXVI Corps during the Greco-Italian War.

== History ==
The division's lineage begins with the Brigade "Cuneo" established in 1815, which on 25 October 1831 split to form the 1st and 2nd infantry regiments under the brigade's command. On 4 May 1839 the two regiments were re-numbered as 7th and 8th infantry regiments.

=== World War I ===
The brigade fought on the Italian front in World War I. On 1 November 1926 the brigade assumed the name of VI Infantry Brigade and received the 67th Infantry Regiment "Palermo" from the disbanded Brigade "Palermo". The brigade was the infantry component of the 6th Territorial Division of Milan, which also included the 27th Field Artillery Regiment. In 1934 the division changed its name to 6th Infantry Division "Legnano". On 24 May 1939 the division ceded its name and the 67th Infantry Regiment "Palermo" to the newly activated 58th Infantry Division "Legnano". On the same day the division took its traditional name "Cuneo", dissolved the VI Infantry Brigade, with the two remaining infantry regiments coming under direct command of the division, and the 27th Artillery Regiment was given the name "Cuneo".

=== World War II ===
==== Invasion of France ====
During the invasion of France, the Cuneo division was assigned to the Limone Piemonte area on 10 June 1940, from where it advanced to Tende by 21 June 1940. However the Franco-Italian Armistice was signed on 4 June 1940 before the division entered combat.

==== Greco-Italian War ====
During the Greco-Italian War the Cuneo was sent as reinforcement to Albania arriving in early January 1941. The division was tasked to recapture Himarë from Greek forces, but failed to reach the assault positions in time. The Cuneo participated in the defensive battle at LLogara pass, which had started on 28 December 1940 and lasted until 31 January 1941. The battle was fought in appalling mountain winter conditions, with troops frequently dying from exposure. In February 1941 the units of the Cuneo were dispersed along the front in support of other units from Vuno to Berat.

On 29 March 1941 the Cuneo was withdrawn from the front line to the west bank of Drin river in Albania, to counter the threat of the Yugoslavian army after the anti-axis coup in Yugoslavia. The Cuneo reinforced the gap between the 41st Infantry Division "Firenze" and the IX Army Corps in the defensive line at the Yugoslav border. After Germany entered the war against Greece on 6 April 1941, the Cuneo moved to its original position and started an offense toward Himarë on 14 April 1941. On 16 April 1941 the Greek frontline collapsed and by 17 April 1941 the Cuneo had advanced through Himarë towards Porto Palermo. On 19 April 1941 the Cuneo had captured a Piqueras village in Lukovë municipality, then took Sarandë by combined land and amphibious assault, and finally captured the southernmost Albanian town of Konispol on 23 April 1941.

==== Greece ====
The Cuneo remained in Greece as part of the Axis occupation force, first in Igoumenitsa and Paramythia, later in Missolonghi and finally in the Cyclades - garrisoning the islands of Naxos and Icaria (by garrison and coastal batteries), Samos (division headquarters), Andros, Santorini and Syros (garrison only).

After the announcement of the Armistice of Cassibile on 8 September 1943 the division fought German forces with British support from 9 September until 21–23 November, when its remaining forces were evacuated to Kuşadası in Turkey. The remnants of the division were transferred to the Middle East, where the allies employed the troops in support roles.

== Organization ==
6th Infantry Division "Cuneo" organization in 1940

- 6th Infantry Division "Cuneo", in Milan
  - Headquarters
    - Command Company
    - 16th Carabinieri Section
    - 17th Carabinieri Section
    - 62nd Field Post Office
    - 6th Infantry Division Command Transport Squad
  - 7th Infantry Regiment "Cuneo", in Milan
    - Command Company
    - 3 × Fusilier battalions
    - Support Weapons Battery (65/17 mod. 13 infantry support guns)
    - Mortar Company (81mm mod. 35 mortars)
  - 8th Infantry Regiment "Cuneo", in Milan
    - Command Company
    - 3 × Fusilier battalions
    - Support Weapons Battery (65/17 mod. 13 infantry support guns)
    - Mortar Company (81mm mod. 35 mortars)
  - 27th Artillery Regiment "Cuneo", in Milan
    - Command Unit
    - I Group (100/17 mod. 14 howitzers)
    - II Group (75/27 mod. 11 field guns; transferred on 1 December 1940 to the 41st Artillery Regiment "Firenze")
    - II Group (75/18 mod. 34 mountain guns; transferred on 1 December 1940 from the 41st Artillery Regiment "Firenze")
    - III Group (75/13 mod. 15 mountain guns)
    - 1 × Anti-aircraft battery (20/65 mod. 35 anti-aircraft guns)
    - Ammunition and Supply Unit
  - VI Mortar Battalion (81mm mod. 35 mortars)
  - 6th Anti-tank Company (47/32 mod. 35 anti-tank guns)
  - 6th Telegraph and Radio Operators Company (entered the VI Engineer Battalion in 1942)
  - 24th Engineer Company (entered the VI Engineer Battalion in 1942)
  - 2nd Supply Section
  - 4th Medical Section
    - 3 × Field hospitals
    - 1 × Surgical Unit
  - 6th Autocarrette Section
  - 133rd Transport Section

Attached during the invasion of France in 1940:

- XXIV CC.NN. Battalion

Attached from 14 November 1940:

- 24th CC.NN. Legion "Carroccio"
  - Command Company
  - XXV CC.NN. Battalion
  - LXXXV CC.NN. Battalion
  - 24th CC.NN. Machine Gun Company

Attached in the Cyclades:

- 35th Coastal Artillery Grouping
- 36th Coastal Artillery Grouping
- 55th Coastal Artillery Grouping
- 56th Anti-aircraft Artillery Grouping

== Commanding officers ==
The division's commanding officers were:

- Generale di Divisione Carlo Melotti (15 November 1939 - 12 February 1942)
- Generale di Divisione Pietro Maggiani (13 February 1942 - 16 January 1943)
- Generale di Divisione Mario Soldarelli (17 January 1943 - 23 November 1943)

== CROWCASS ==
The names of three men attached to the division can be found in the Central Registry of War Criminals and Security Suspects (CROWCASS) set up by the Anglo-American Supreme Headquarters Allied Expeditionary Force in 1945. The names can be found at: Central Registry of War Criminals and Security Suspects from the Kingdom of Italy.
