= Spitz di Tonezza =

Mountain in Italy

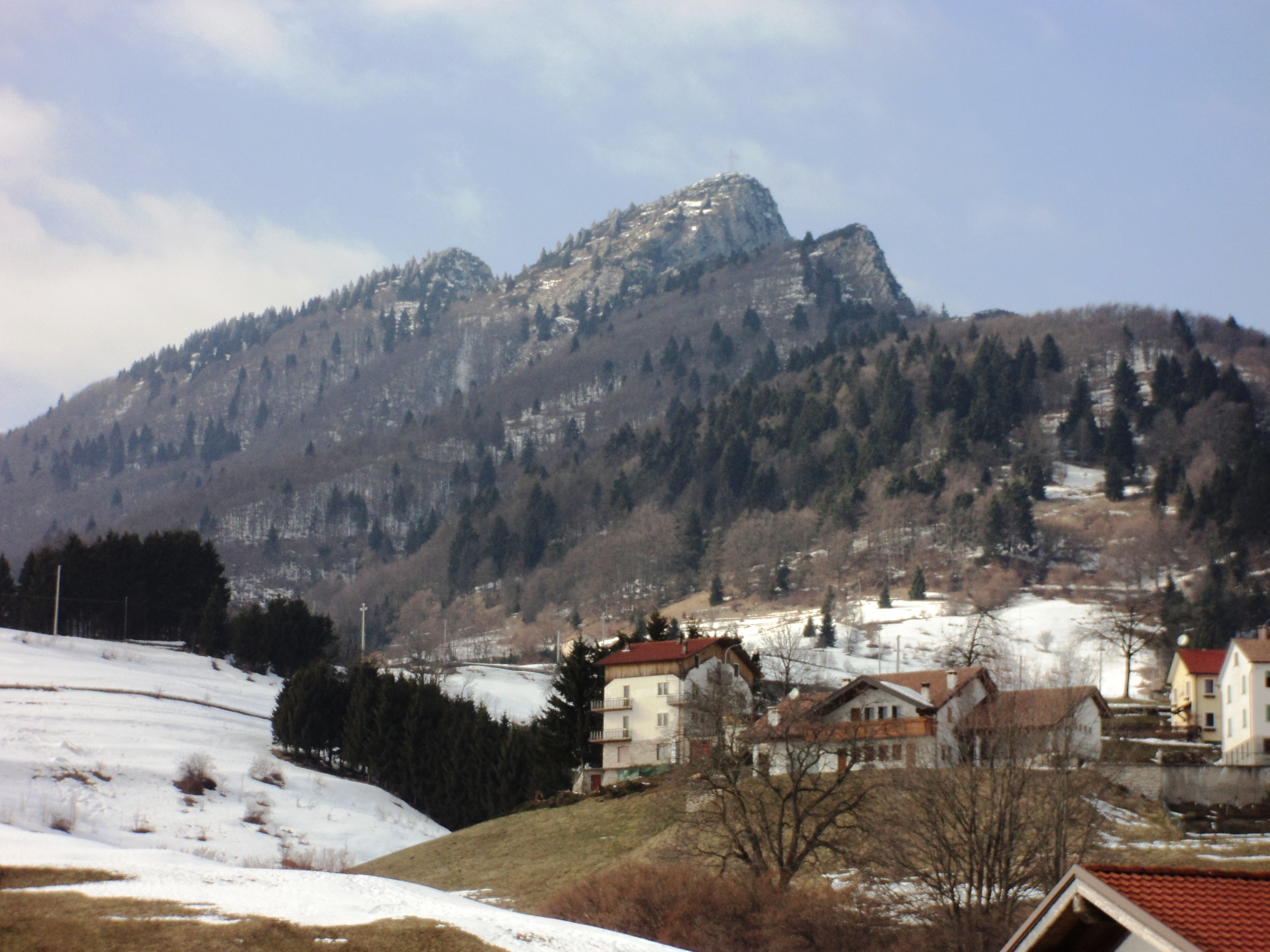
- Spitz di Tonezza seen from Tonezza del Cimone

Highest point
- Elevation: 1,694 m (5,558 ft)
- Coordinates: 45°52′30″N 11°19′09″E

Geography
- Location: Veneto, Italy
- Parent range: Vicentine Alps

Spitz di Tonezza is a mountain of Veneto, Italy. It is located on the Asiago Plateau, in the Vicentine Alps, and has an elevation of 1,694 metres (5,558 ft).

It lies east of Monte Toraro and Monte Campomolon, overlooking the town of Tonezza del Cimone. Its south side is wooded and easily accessible, whereas the rocky northern face is rugged and vertical.

The mountain was heavily contested between Italy and Austria-Hungary during World War I.
