= Ugo Brusati =

Italian general (1847–1936)

Ugo Brusati GCVO
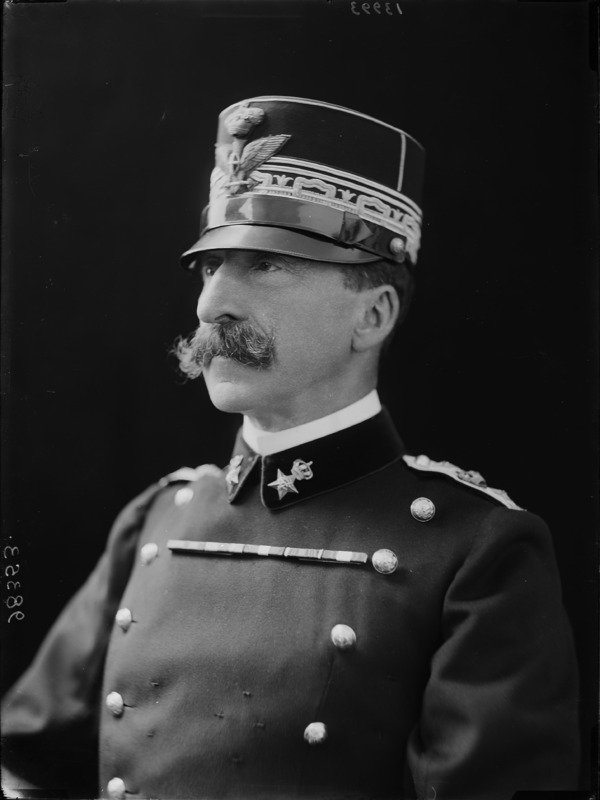
- Ugo Brusati photographed by Mario Nunes Vais

First Aide-de-Camp to the King
- In office 2 June 1902 – 23 October 1917
- Monarch: Vittorio Emanuele III
- Prime Minister: Vittorio Emanuele Orlando
- Preceded by: Felice Avogadro di Quinto
- Succeeded by: Arturo Cittadini

Senator of the Kingdom of Italy
- In office 17 March 1912 – 19 January 1934
- Prime Minister: Benito Mussolini

Personal details
- Born: June 25, 1847 Monza, Lombardy–Venetia, Austrian Empire
- Died: November 4, 1936 (aged 89) Rome, Lazio, Italy
- Spouse: Bice Pedotti
- Relations: Roberto Brusati (brother)

Military service
- Allegiance: Italy
- Branch: Royal Italian Army
- Years of service: 1866–1917
- Rank: General of the Army
- Battles/wars: Third Italian War of Independence; First Italo-Ethiopian War: Battle of Adwa; World War I: Battles of the Isonzo

Ugo Pio Enrico Natale Brusati, GCVO was an Italian General who participated in the First Italo-Ethiopian War and World War I. He gained notability for his service at the Battle of Adwa as well as being the First Adjudant General of Vittorio Emanuele III on 2 June 1902 until 23 October 1917, when Luigi Cadorna forced him out of the office.

== Early Military Career ==
Brusati was born in Monza on 25 June 1847, the eldest son of Giuseppe and Teresa Aman, into a household with strong nationalism. Determined to undertake a military career, he attended the Military College of Florence to enter the Royal Academy of Turin on 2 June 1864. In 1866, at the time of the Third Italian War of Independence, he obtained the appointment as a second lieutenant. He soon proved to be an excellent officer of the general staff, from 1870 he attended the War School of Turin, of which he later became a professor. Between 20 December 1887 and 10 March 1891 he held the position of military attaché at the Italian Embassy in Vienna. He was then promoted to the rank of colonel on 23 August 1891 and assumed command of the 71st Infantry Regiment. During his service, he wrote some literary works about his military services, intended for use by officers of the General Staff.

== Adwa and the early 20th-century ==
During 1895, while carrying out the post of Chief of Staff of the XI Army Corps, he was assigned to the expeditionary force which, under the leadership of General Oreste Baratieri, had to face the war with Ethiopia. Landing in Massawa on 2 January 1896, he was given the command of the 2nd African Infantry Regiment, framed in the 1st Brigade under the command of General Giuseppe Arimondi. As soon as he took office, he immediately brought back a very negative impression of the colonial environment, which seemed to him dominated by arrival and a guilty underestimation of the enemy forces. His fears were confirmed during the Battle of Adwa, which took place on 1 March 1896. The regiment under his command was engaged in combat on unknown terrain and was completely unfavorable, against an enemy superior in number, being practically destroyed. He was one of the few surviving officers of the battle, escaping death thanks to his energy. For his behavior during the battle, he was decorated with the Knight's Cross of the Military Order of Savoy. Returning to Italy on 1 March 1897, exactly one year after the battle, he gave a conference in Turin, entitled Impressions and memories of Africa, in which he spoke about the causes of the defeat with extreme frankness. On August 29 of the same year, he was promoted to the rank of major general and appointed commander of the "Friuli" Brigade. The following year, he assumed the post of first aide-de-camp to the crown prince, HRH Vittorio Emanuele di Savoia, Prince of Naples. On the death of King Umberto I, he continued to serve his successor, Vittorio Emanuele III, as an effective general aide-de-camp. On 2 June 1902 he assumed the post of first adjutant general to the King. This position was extremely important as at the time the sovereign still had a direct interference in the daily life of the Royal Italian Army and the Royal Italian Navy, especially in promotions to the highest military ranks. The delicacy of this assignment was evident, and he always maintained an innate reserve, as well as a strict reserve but over time, complaints were submitted to him from time to time. On 17 March 1912 he received the appointment as Senator of the Kingdom of Italy, taking the oath on the 27th of the same month. On 25 May that year he was promoted to the rank of lieutenant general.

== World War I ==
Italy's entry into the war, on 24 May 1915, made his position more important, but also extremely delicate, as his brother Roberto was the commander of the 1st Army and engaged at the Italian front. The subsequent "torpedoing" of his brother by General Luigi Cadorna, Chief of Staff of the Italian Army, which took place on 8 May 1916 and the subsequent press campaign against him marked the beginning of his misadventures. During the course of the war, he always followed the king in every inspection of the lines or departments. Another of the king's aides, Lieutenant Colonel Luciano degli Azzoni Avogadro described him as intelligent, very active, cordially attached to the King and courteous with everyone. On 23 October 1917, the eve of the Battle of Caporetto, General Cadorna removed him from the position of First Aide-de-Camp. In fact, he attributed the fact to Cadorna's enmity for having immediately asked for explanations on the dismissal of his brother. The official reason given was that Brusati had reached the age limit for active service, but it had not been relied on for many other generals who were then dismissed. He shut himself up in absolute silence, but maintained a close correspondence with his brother, a fact that testifies how much this cost him. He followed with disdain at first, and then with melancholy, the subsequent events of Italy during the First World War . He always fought for the complete rehabilitation of his brother, which took place in 1919. With the advent of Italian fascism, in 1925, he was promoted to general in the army to an auxiliary position to be immediately retired for seniority. During the war, his wife, Countess Bice Pedotti, was suspected by the Reserved Office of the Ministry of the Interior of espionage for the Austro-Hungarian Army despite no evidence emerging from this accusation.

== Awards ==
- Military Order of Savoy
  - Knight (11 March 1898)
- Order of the Crown of Italy
  - Officer (28 December 1893)
  - Commander (8 June 1897)
  - Grand Officer (22 March 1900)
  - Grand Cordon (14 June 1903)
- Order of Saints Maurice and Lazarus
  - Knight (13 January 1889)
  - Officer (20 January 1898)
  - Commander (5 January 1899)
  - Grand Officer (8 June 1902)
  - Grand Cordon (18 June 1908)
- Cross of Military Seniority
- Maurician medal
- Commemorative Medal of the African Campaigns

=== Foreign Awards ===
- United Kingdom: Royal Victorian Order, Knights Grand Cross (30 April 1903)

== Works ==
- Breve studio sull'ordinamento dello Stato Maggiore, Rome, 1879.
- Ordinamento dell'esercito germanico, austriaco, francese e italiano, Torino, 1883.
- Ordinamento dell'esercito svizzero, Rome, 1885.
