= Vittorio Luigi Alfieri =

Italian military officer (1863–1918)

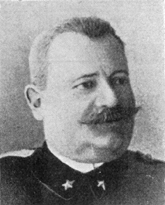

Minister of War of the Kingdom of Italy
- In office 30 October 1917 – 20 March 1918
- Prime Minister: Vittorio Emanuele Orlando
- Preceded by: Gaetano Giardino
- Succeeded by: Vittorio Zupelli

Personal details
- Born: July 3, 1863 Perugia
- Died: November 8, 1918 (aged 55) Musestre
- Cause of death: Spanish flu and pneumonia

Military service
- Rank: Lieutenant General
- Commands: Italian Colonial Forces in Somalia; 26th Army Corps
- Battles/wars: World War I: Battle of Caporetto

Vittorio Luigi Alfieri (Perugia, July 3, 1863 – Musestre, November 8, 1918) was an Italian military officer. He was Minister of Defence of the Kingdom of Italy following the defeat at the Battle of Caporetto, the most critical time of World War I for Italy.

== Career ==
Vittorio Luigi Alfieri began his military career with his appointment as second lieutenant of infantry in 1881, initially specializing in the Alpine corps and from 1889 being attached to the General Staff. From 1900 to 1905, with the rank of major and then lieutenant colonel, he was an instructor in logistics at the War School. He was then attached from 1908 to 1911 to the Italian Ministry of War and attained the rank of colonel, after which he was posted to the Banaadir as commander of the Italian colonial forces in Somalia, a position he held until 1913. On his return to Italy he was promoted to major general, and briefly commanded the "Brescia" brigade. Before the outbreak of World War I he was the director general of personnel at the Ministry of War.

Alfieri became Minister of Defence on October 30, 1917, when Vittorio Emanuele Orlando became prime minister. He knew Armando Diaz from his days at the War College, and urged his appointment as the new field commander to replace Luigi Cadorna following the defeat at Caporetto. He also modernized and improved armaments and organization in the Italian Army. His term as war minister ended on March 20, 1918; since a decisive attack by the Central Powers was feared, he decided to leave politics and return to front-line duty, where he commanded the 26th Army Corps.

He contracted the Spanish flu and developed pneumonia; he died on November 8, 1918, shortly after learning that his men had been victorious at Trieste and the war was won.
