= 1st Army (Italy) =

Italian Army field army, in World Wars I and II

1ª Armata 1st Army
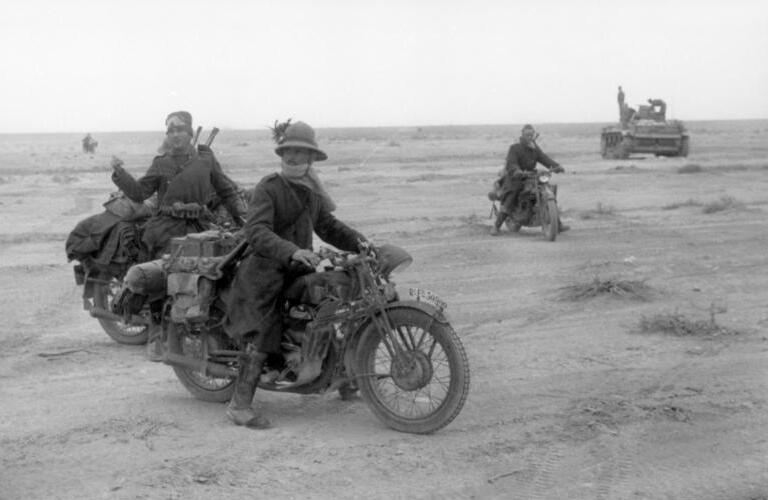
- 1st Army, Italy
- Active: 1914–1918; 1939–1943
- Country: Kingdom of Italy
- Branch: Royal Italian Army
- Type: Army
- Engagements: World War I World War II: Italian invasion of France; North African campaign; Tunisian Campaign

Commanders
- Notable commanders: Giovanni Messe

The 1st Army (Italian: 1ª Armata) was a Royal Italian Army field army, in World War I, facing Austro-Hungarian and German forces, and in World War II, fighting on the North African front.

== World War I ==
During World War I, the 1st Army bore the responsibility of a long front from Stelvio Pass on the Swiss-Austrian Italian tri-border to the Asiago plateau. It successfully resisted the Austro-Hungarian Strafexpedition. Its sector was later reduced, limiting its role to the defense of the Trentino borders and the Verona area.

Its commanders were:

- Roberto Brusati (May 1915 – May 1916)
- Guglielmo Pecori Giraldi (May 1916 – December 1919)

=== Formation & Operations in 1915 ===
The 1st Army originated with the Army of Milan which became, in October 1914, the 1st Army. In addition to various army corps (up to five), it had available to it large units not included in the army corps: infantry and cavalry divisions and groups of Alpine troops. Even the truppe altipiani command was subsequently placed within this Army. The 1st Army during the conflict participated in conquests, various setbacks and reconquests (primarily the so-called White War) until the final battle of Vittorio Veneto.

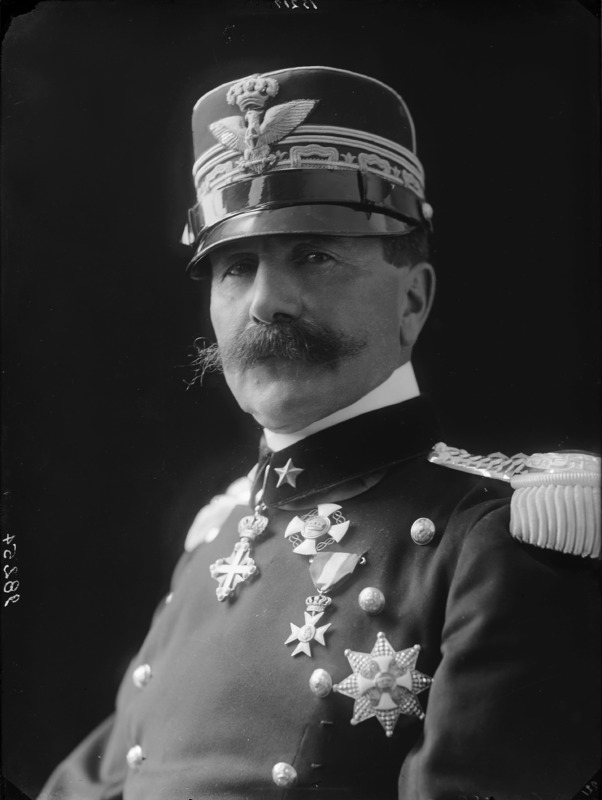
General Brusati as General of the Army

As the 1st World War extended to Italy, this Army was placed under the command of Lieutenant General Roberto Brusati and consisted of the III Army Corps (Corpo d'Armata) of Milan under the command of Lieutenant General Vittorio Camerana and the V Army Corps of Verona under the command of Lieutenant General Florenzo Aliprandi.

Each Army Corps consisted of three infantry divisions, including field artillery and sapper units. In addition, there was a corps troop consisting of bersaglieri, alpini, cavalry, artillery and other specialists and an army troop consisting of infantry, cavalry, artillery and specialists.

The 1st Army, which now had its headquarters in Verona, was deployed from the Stelvio Pass to the Rolle Pass/Cismon or about 200 kilometers along the war front, with the III Army Corps responsible from the Swiss border to the Lake Garda area and the V Army Corps from Garda to Rolle/Cismon, where the 4th Army began its sector. This was designated the Trentino Front. According to the plans of the supreme commander of the army, the 1st Army was to maintain a strategically defensive posture, not only during the period of the war build-up, but also through the time in which the (adjacent) 4th Army under General Luigi Nava would operate from Cadore to attempt to open a route towards the Tyrol.

The 1st Army, however, was to carry out limited offensives to ensure the security of the Italian border, and occupy any enemy territory, wherever this was possible and convenient. In Cadorna's plan, the 1st Army would defend against any Austrian offensive from Trentino thus protecting (along with the 4th Army) the rear of the bulk of the Italian army which was engaged on the Isonzo Front.

With the task of having to stay on the defensive, Brusati was frustrated by (in his opinion) Cadorna's inability to understand that the Austro-Hungarians had retreated on a defensive line well beyond the official border. Thus, Brusati's 1st Army carried out offensive operations enthusiastically. Already on 25 May 1915, the day after Italy entered the war, these Italian troops, taking advantage of the fact that the Austro-Hungarian troops were deployed far from the border, conquered terrain of considerable strategic value, such as Monte Altissimo, Coni Zunga and parts of the Val d'Adige and Vallarsa, near Lake Garda.

However, starting from August, after the failure of new attacks against the Austro-Hungarian permanent fortifications (on the Vézzena Plateau) that guarded the head of the Val d'Astico (east of the previous successes), General Cadorna directed the 1st Army Command back to the defensive mode. Nevertheless, Brusati did not give up on further operations aimed at consolidating the front, sometimes deploying his troops in an offensive stance. This alignment led to neglecting the defensive preparations with the bulk of the forces available remaining concentrated on the advanced positions, rather than on the rear positions, more suitable for defensive operations.

=== Operations in 1916 ===
In March 1916, the information services of the Army had the 1st news of a concentration of Austrian forces in the Trentino sector. These were to be the preparations for the so-called Strafexpedition, planned by the Chief of Staff of the Imperial Royal Austro-Hungarian Army, Field Marshal Franz Conrad von Hötzendorf. This offensive had the intent to defeat the Italian army, unleashing an offensive through the lines of the 1st Army to take the entire Italian Isonzo deployment from the rear. In view of a probable enemy offensive, at his request, Cadorna granted Brusati five further divisions. However, Cadorna remained persuaded that nothing would happen in that sector.

Still Brusati's troops were strung-out after their offensive advances and the state of the defenses was ill-prepared. In disagreement with Cadorna, Brusati deployed the defense at the end of the advanced positions counting on the solidity of the strengthening work carried out until then. In addition, on 1 April, the Army again went on the offensive, launching assaults which achieved some partial successes, but at the cost of the defense.

In the second half of April General Cadorna visited the lines of the 1st Army and on that occasion he even refused to meet Brusati because, according to some, he already had plans to dismiss him. On 8 May Brusati was relieved from command by Cadorna and replaced by General Guglielmo Pecori Giraldi, eight days before the Austro-Hungarian counter-offensive began.

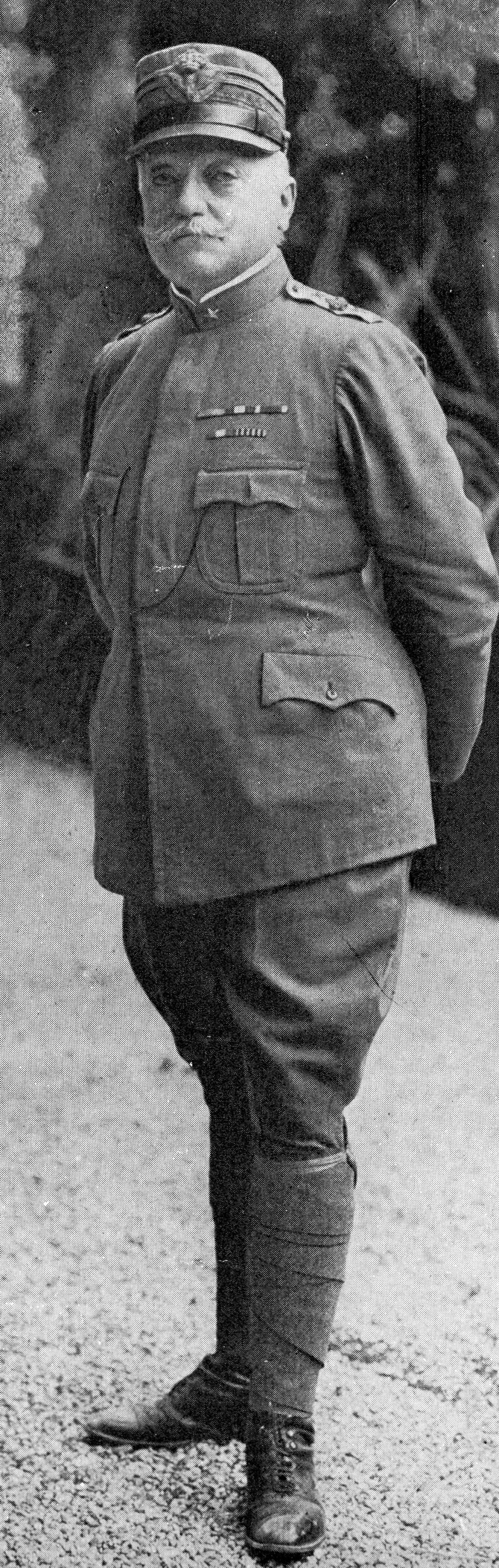
General Pecori Giraldi

Ultimately the 1st Army along with elements of the newly created Fifth Army prevailed in this major Austro-Hungarian action, helped by the Russian Brusilov Offensive in Galacia which required von Hötzendorf to move troops away from the Italian offensive and to the Eastern Front.

In August 1916, the 1st Army was reorganized and growing, along with the Regio Esercito overall as more draftees reached the war zone. The 1st Army now had six Corps, covering the same frontlines in the Trentino. The III Corps (5th, 6th and 37th Divisions) remained under Gen. Camerana. The V Corps (44th, 47th and 32 Divisions) was added under Lt. General Bertotti; along with the X Corps (9th and 20th Divisions) under Lt. Gen. Grandi; a new Truppe Altipiani commanded by Lt. General Mambretti and consisting of the XII Corps (30th, 29th and 25th Divisions) under Lt. Gen. Zoppi and the XX Corps (13th, 28th and an Alpini Unit) under Lt. General Montuori; and the XVIII Corps (15th Division and 2nd Cavalry) under Lt. Gen. Etna. There was a Corps Troop at Verona consisting of infantry battalions, artillery, bomb units, cavalry and engineer units.

For the balance of 1916, this Army engaged in fights and other actions in what became known as the White War. There were attacks on Monte Pasubio (in September and October), Monte Cimone (in September), in Val Sugana (in August and September) and numerous small actions in Val Sugana, Val Posina and Altipiano d'Asiago. Many soldiers also died in avalanches.

In November 1916 the 1st Army with Cardorna's consent, had planned "Action K" (Code Name) a small counteroffensive targeting Monte Ortigara using General Mambretti's Truppe Altipiani as well as the XVIII Corps. This action had to be cancelled due to heavy snows. The Italian Command would later reprise and augment the plan for June 1917. On 1 December 1916 Mambretti was now placed in charge of a new Sixth Army (Italy) taking his XX Corps as well as the XVIII Corps. Added to these troops were two newly constituted Corps, the XXII and XXVI.

=== Operations in 1917 ===
As part of a re-organization (after Caporetto) several new Corps were created and assigned (1916–1917) to the 1st Army including the XXIX, V, XXVI, and XXII Corps. At this time the Trentino Front was defended by the III Corps (5th and 6th Divisions and the Brigata Valtellina) from Stevio to Garda; the XXIX Corps (37th and 27th Divisions), V Corps (55th and 69 Divisions), X Corps (32nd and 9th Divisions), three Corps of Truppe Altipiani (XXVI – 12th and 11th Divisions, XXII – 57th and 2nd Divisions and XX – 29th and 52 Divisions) from Garda to Sugana.

The 1st Army did not take part in any major defensive or counteroffensive battles in 1917. The 1st Army did, however, defend the Asiago Plateau during the Battle of Caporetto which helped the retreating Italian troops to set up a strong defensive line at the Piave River in November.

However, the White War continued in 1917 for the 1st Army through a series of small actions (between June and October) in the high isolated valleys of the Trentino mountains. The following minor actions were reported):

- Corno di Cavento (Adamello) with the 5th Division, Casina Garioni / Casina Pascon with the X Corps,
- Mascio with the III Corps, Vallagarina at Mori and Mt. Giovo with the XXIX Corps,
- Val di Ledro (III Corps), Val Posina (V Corps),
- Massico dell'Ortler (Arditi),
- Val Concei and Dosso Prighen (III Corps),
- Val Giudicare (III Corps),
- Mt. Altissimo (XXIX Corps) and
- Val Camonica (III Corps).

=== Operations in 1918 ===
Although the 1st Army was part of the re-organization of the Italian Army after Caporetto, the modifications were originally quite minor. In January 1918, the Order of Battle was essentially the same as the October changes except for the addition of the XXV Corps to the Truppe Altipiani under Gen. Zoppi. However, in March, the III Corps and a new Corps, the XIV were transferred to the newly created 7th Army which became responsible for the Stelvio-Garda Sector. Furthermore the Truppe Altipiani were dispersed to other Italian Armies, including the newly re-constituted 6th Army (which also included the British and French Expeditionary Forces which came to Italy after Caporetto) which took over responsibility for the defenses at Asiago and the re-organized 4th Army which also took over responsibility for the mountain defenses at Mt. Grappa in their western zone.

The 1st Army saw limited action in the mountains between January and May. There were continuous patrols which occasionally led to small firefights and artillery shelling (including aerial bombardments). This Army saw minor action in Mt. Cornone (Altopiano di Asiago), Tre Monti and the Val Lagarina subsector (Conca dei Laghi and Castello Mori), and the Vallarsa (Mt. Corno).

During the Austrian Offensive in June 1918 (Second Battle of the Piave), the 1st Army (and the 7th Army) was responsible for the defense at the Trentino Front. There were no major offensives or Italian counteroffensives launched in this zone, although the Austro-Hungarians applied some offensive pressure in support of its Operation Radetzky. On 15 June, the Italian Division 6 consisting of the Czechoslovak Legion in Italy was assigned to the 1st Army. However, after this battle, operations began to pick up beginning in August with the following small battles:

- Battle of Dosso Alto di Zurez – (Hill 703) – On 3 August, north of Monte Altissimo, the XXIX Corps (Arditi) retook this position which the Austrians had held since 15 June.
- Battle of Monte Majo in Val Posina (left of Mt. Pasubio) – On 30 August, the V Corps (Bersaglieri and Arditi) captured Hill 1500 opposite Il Dente di Cane.
- Nord Sano – On 11 September, Arditi with support from a Czech Regiment took an Austrian post near Mori and captured 12 prisoners.
- Dosso Alto and Sasso Sega – On 21 September, Czech Legion fought off an attempt by the Austrians to re-capture this position.
- Cima Tre Pezzi – On 24 September, bersaglieri and Czechs (from X Corps Sector) took a position here, assisted by artillery fire from the British Division of the adjacent Sixth Army.
- Vallone di Belassi – Alpini (X Corps) in a counterattack on 25 September captured Austrian positions in Collegio across from Valle Scarabozza.
- Pasubio – Col Santo – On 26 September, Bersaglieri (V Corps) fought off an Austrian attempt to attack Monte Corno.

=== The Final Battle ===
As the final battle (Vittorio Veneto) began at the end of October, the 1st Army (along with the 7th) was to maintain a strictly defensive position. However, as the battle progressed and the Austro-Hungarian Army at 1st retreated, then collapsed into a disorganized retreat, the 1st Army began an offensive thrust towards Rovereto and the city of Trento.

On 2 November, while the situation of the Austro-Hungarian army became increasingly pessimistic, the Italian Supreme Command also set in motion the troops of the 1st Army of Giraldi. Since the previous night the Xth Army Corps had attacked in Val d'Astico encountering little resistance; consequently Giraldi decided to speed up the operations and his troops immediately advanced in the Tonezza plateau and in the Luserna plateau. The march of the 32nd Division in Vallagarina began in the early afternoon; a unit of Arditi, under the command of Major Gastone Gambara, and three Alpine battalions advanced into the valley and occupied Rovereto.

The advance of the Italian army now became general. On the left bank of the Adige, the Piceno and Liguria brigades marched in Vallarsa and on the Pasubio, in Val Posina. In the Adige valley the disintegration and collapse of the Austro-Hungarians became catastrophic; materials and vehicles were abandoned, the trains heading north were stormed by the soldiers, as panic and lack of discipline spread.

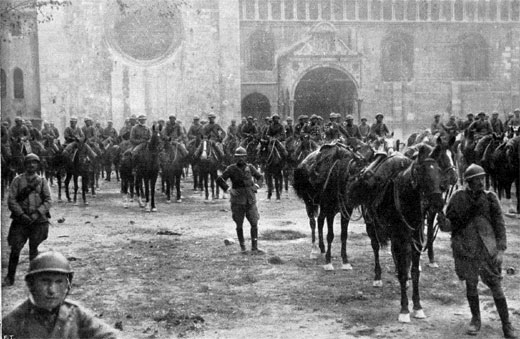
Italian troops in Trento on 3 November 1918

On the afternoon of 3 November, the troops of the 1st Army reached Trento: the 1st units to enter the city were the cavalry regiment "Alessandria", the XXIVth Arditi, the Alpini of the IVth group; the infantry of the Pistoia brigade arrived later. The final advance had not met with any real opposition: the Italian soldiers received an enthusiastic welcome from the population. That evening a unit of the "Padua" cavalry regiment of the 4th Army of General Giardino also arrived in Trento; and on the following afternoon Giraldi himself, commander of the 1st Army, entered Trento, when the Armistice took effect.

After the Armistice, the 1st Army became responsible for the occupation to all of Trentino, South Tyrol (both of which became part of Italy) and Austrian Tyrol. On 20 September 1919 the 1st Army Command became the Trento area Command, one of the new designated army commands of the Royal Army.

== World War II ==
At the beginning of World War II, the Italian 1st Army was one of three armies that made up Army Group West commanded by Prince General Umberto di Savoia. Together with the Italian Fourth Army and the Italian Seventh Army (kept in reserve), the 1st Army attacked French forces during the Italian invasion of France. At this time, the 1st Army was commanded by General Pietro Pintor and included three army corps: the 2nd Corps commanded by General Francesco Bertini, the 3rd Corps – General Mario Arisio, and the 15th Corps commanded by General Gastone Gambara.

By 1942, after the defeat of Panzer Army Africa (Panzerarmee Afrika) at the Second Battle of El Alamein and after the Operation Torch landings, Field Marshal Erwin Rommel was forced to make one of the longest retreats in history. He withdrew from Egypt and Libya and established a defence on the French-built Mareth Line in southern Tunisia. After occupying the Mareth Line, Rommel took command of the newly created Army Group Africa and turned over the "German-Italian Panzer Army" (formerly "Panzer Army Africa") to Italian General Giovanni Messe.

As part of Army Group Africa commanded by General Rommel, the 1st Army attacked Lieutenant General Bernard Montgomery's Eighth Army at Operation Capri (the Battle of Medenine, just east of the Mareth Line. The 1st Army suffered a crushing defeat and the attempt by Rommel and Arnim to break through in Tunisia failed. The army capitulated on 13 May 1943, along with its commander, at the end of the Tunisian campaign.

=== Order of Battle at 10 June 1940 ===
Order of Battle at 10 June 1940

==== 2nd Corps ====
Commanded by General Francesco Bertini

- 4th Infantry Division "Livorno" (Gen. Benvenuto Gioda)
- 33rd Infantry Division "Acqui" (Gen. Francesco Sartoris)
- 36th Infantry Division "Forlì" (Gen. Giulio Perugi)
- 4th Alpine Division "Cuneense" (Gen. Alberto Ferrero)

Corps Reserves:

- 3rd Guardia alla Frontiera (Frontier Guards) Sector
- 2nd Corps Artillery Group
- 2nd Engineer Group
- 7th Guardia alla Frontiera Artillery Group
- 14th Guardia alla Frontiera Artillery Group
- 22nd Guardia alla Frontiera Artillery Group
- Alpini Battalion "Val Stura"
- Alpini Battalion "Val Maira"
- 6th Machine Gun Battalion
- 102nd Machine Gun Battalion
- 109th Positional Machine Gun Battalion
- 114th Positional Machine Gun Battalion
- 5th "Artieri" (Construction Engineers) Battalion
- 2nd Tank Company
- 84th Telegraph Company
- 152nd Workers Company
- 1st Chemical Company
- 72nd Searchlights Section
- 6th Mobile Pigeon-Messengers Unit

==== 3rd Corps ====
Commanded by General Mario Arisio

- 3rd Infantry Division "Ravenna" (Gen. Edoardo Nebbia)
- 6th Infantry Division "Cuneo" (Gen. Carlo Melotti)

Corps Reserves:

- 2nd Guardia alla Frontiera Sector
- 3rd Corps Artillery Group
- 3rd Engineer Group
- 16th Guardia alla Frontiera Artillery Group
- Alpini Battalion "Val Venosta"
- 3rd MMG. Btl.
- 103rd MMG. Btl.
- 112th Positional MMG. Btl.
- 10th "Artieri" (Construction Eng) Btl.
- 7th Telegraph Coy.
- 72nd Telegraph Coy.
- 3rd Blackshirts Btl.
- 4th Blackshirts Btl.
- 8th Mobile Pigeon-Messengers Unit

==== 15th Corps ====
Commanded by General Gastone Gambara

- 5th Infantry Division "Cosseria" (Gen. Alberto Vassari)
- 37th Infantry Division "Modena" (Gen. Alessandro Gloria)
- 44th Infantry Division "Cremona" (Gen. Umberto Mondino)
- Alpini Group (4 x Alpini Btl.s – 2 x Alpini Art. Btl.s – 1 x Blackshirts Btl.)

Corps Reserves:

- 1st Guardia alla Frontiera Sector
- 5th Guardia alla Frontiera Sector
- 15th Corps Art.Grp.
- 11th Guardia alla Frontiera Art.Grp.
- 24th Guardia alla Frontiera Art.Grp.
- 15th MMG. Btl.
- 108th Positional MMG. Btl.
- 111th Positional MMG. Btl.
- 9th "Artieri" (Construction Eng) Btl.
- 71st Telegraph Coy.
- 76th Telegraph Coy.
- 100th Radio Coy.
- 33rd Blackshirts Btl.
- 34th Blackshirts Btl.

==== Army Reserves ====
- 4th AA Art. Rgt
- 2nd Army Art.Grp.
- 4th Army Art.Grp.
- 7th Army Art.Grp.
- 8th Army Art.Grp.
- 1st Signal Btl.
- 2nd Cableways Btl.
- 2nd Miners (Mountain Eng) Btl.
- 5th Miners Btl.
- 69th Air Force Sqn. (recon)
- 7th Infantry Division "Lupi di Toscana" (Gen. Ottavio Priore)
- 16th Infantry Division "Pistoia" (Gen. Mario Priore)
- 22nd Infantry Division "Cacciatori delle Alpi" (Gen. Dante Lorenzelli)
- 5th Alpine Division "Pusteria" (Gen. Amedeo De Cia)
- "Celere" (fast – motor) Grp.
- 1st Bersaglieri Rgt
- 3rd Tank Rgt
- "Cavalleggeri di Monferrato" Cav. Rgt

=== Order of Battle as of April 1943 ===
Order of Battle, as of April 1943.

- 21st Panzer Division
- 15th Panzer Division
- 90th Light Division
- 164th Light Division
- 16th Motorized Division "Pistoia"
- 101st Motorized Division "Trieste"
- 131st Armored Division "Centauro"
- 136th Armored Division "Giovani Fascisti"
- L Special Brigade

=== Commanders ===
- General Adriano Marinetti – 1939 – June 1940
- General Pietro Pintor – 10 June 1940 – 24 June 1940
- General Giovanni Messe – 23 February 1943 – 13 May 1943
