= Roberto Brusati =

Italian general (1850–1935)

Roberto Brusati OSML OCI
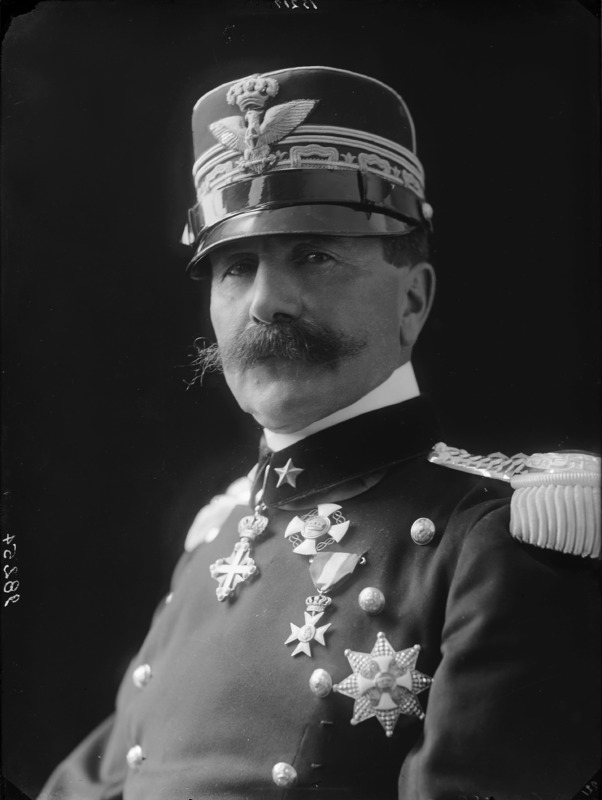

Senator of the Kingdom of Italy
- In office 22 March 1915 – c. 1932
- Monarch: Vittorio Emanuele III
- Prime Minister: Benito Mussolini

Personal details
- Born: July 3, 1850 Milan, Lombardy–Venetia, Austrian Empire
- Died: November 23, 1935 (aged 85) Santa Margherita Ligure, Liguria, Italy
- Spouse: Graziella Ferguson
- Relations: Ugo Brusati (brother)
- Education: Royal Academy of Turin

Military service
- Allegiance: Italy
- Branch: Royal Italian Army
- Years of service: 1866 – 1926
- Rank: General of the Army
- Commands: 1st Army
- Battles/wars: World War I: Italian Front; White War

Roberto Brusati OSML OCI, was an Italian General of the Army who was an active participant in World War I. He was known for not having any military experience prior to the war and commanding the 1st Army before being dismissed from commanding the regiment on May 8, 1916, which was 8 days before the Battle of Asiago which was led by Field Marshal Franz Conrad von Hötzendorf.

== Military career before World War I ==
He was born in Milan on July 3, 1850, as the son of Count Giuseppe and Teresa Aman. Following in the footsteps of his older brother Ugo, In 1863 he was admitted to attend the Military College of Florence and passing to Milan to enter the Royal Academy of Turin in 1866. Due to his own nationalism, Brusati tried unsuccessfully to volunteer to enlist to fight in the Third Italian War of Independence. The selection among the aspiring officers was then very strict, but he always ranked first in his course, graduating in 1869. With his promotion to second lieutenant, he was admitted directly to the General Staff Corps, thus attending the Royal Academy of Turin for two years in order to obtain eligibility for the service of the General Staff and promotion to lieutenant. He later served in the 3rd Artillery Regiment and was sent to Rome and Milan.

In 1876, he was assigned to the Istituto Geografico Militare where he served for six years. In 1877, he was promoted to captain. In 1881 he got married with Miss Graziella Ferguson who was a resident in Florence. In 1884, with the rank of major, he was transferred to the 64th Infantry Regiment which was based in Milan before being transferred to Foggia. In 1887, he was recalled to Rome as Head of the Western Exchequer Office of the Command of the Staff Corps, and then became head of the secretariat of the Deputy Commander of the same body. He was promoted to lieutenant colonel in 1888 and colonel in 1892, the year in which he became commander of the 22nd Infantry Regiment "Cremona" stationed in Messina. In 1896, he became Chief of Staff of the Army Corps of Rome, promoted to major general in 1898. Later, he was commander of the Messina Brigade which was settled in Catania and then to Rome before being sent back to Catanzaro . With his promotion to lieutenant general in 1905, he obtained command of the Ravenna Division and the Rome Division. In 1910, he assumed command of the 1st Army Corps of Turin. On May 3, 1914, he was designated as Army Commander in case of war which was the highest rank of the Royal Italian Army at the time. Although politically, he was inclined to neutralism, when the war against Austria-Hungary was decided, he actively devoted himself to the command of the 1st Army. On December 30 of the same year, he was appointed Senator of the Kingdom, taking the oath on March 22, 1915.

== World War I ==
The 1st Army had its headquarters in Verona and under the orders of General Luigi Cadorna, it had to maintain a strategically defensive attitude, not only during the period of mobilization but also for the entire time in which the 4th Army of General Luigi Nava would have operated from Cadore to open a passage towards Tyrol. However, it had to carry out limited offensives to better ensure the inviolability of the Italian border, occupying Austrian territory whenever it was possible and convenient. Enduring with ill grace having to remain on the defensive, he carried out these offensive operations with the utmost energy. On May 25, 1915, the day after entering the war, the Italian troops, taking advantage of the fact that the Austrian forces were deployed far from the border, conquered considerable Austrian territory. Starting from the second half of August, the insufficiency of supplies led to the failure of the new attacks against the permanent Austrian fortifications that guarded the head of the Val d'Astico. On August 29, General Cadorna recalled the Army Command to its purely defensive task. However, he never gave up on carrying out further operations aimed at consolidating the front, making the deployment of his troops assume a purely offensive projection but this approach led to the neglect of the defenses. The bulk of the available forces remained concentrated on the advanced positions, often uncomfortable and not preparing for defense, rather than on positions where they were more suitable for defensive operations.

In March 1916, while the command of the 1st Army were studying new offensive strategies, the information services of the Army had the first news of a large concentration of Austrian forces in the Trentino sector. These were preparations for the so-called Battle of Asiago, strongly desired and planned by the Chief of Staff of the Imperial Royal Austro-Hungarian Army, Field Marshal Franz Conrad von Hötzendorf. This offensive had the declared intent to annihilate the Royal Italian Army, unleashing a powerful offensive across the lines of the 1st Army to take the entire Italian side from the back. In view of a probable enemy offensive, at his request, the Supreme Command granted Brusati five divisions. On March 24, from London, Cadorna stated:

For no reason, the troops will have to let themselves be dragged by resistance on advanced positions, but any retreat will have to be done promptly so that troops remain efficient to defend the main line.

In open disagreement with Cadorna, Brusati ordered the exact opposite, arranging the indefinite defense of the advanced positions, counting on the solidity of the strengthening works carried out up to then. In addition, on April 1, the Royal Italian Army went on the offensive again, launching assaults that achieved some decisive but partial successes.

On April 6, Brusati confirmed to the Supreme Command that they certainly give a very significant concentration of artillery and roadways in the region of the highlands. This concentration appeared in smaller proportions in the Lagarina and Sugana valleys. The deployment of the Italian troops continued, however the Italian forces became an easy target of the Austrian artillery while the stronger defensive positions behind it remained abandoned. Brusati believed in the immediacy of the Austrian offensive, so much so that on March 22, he renewed the requests to receive further reinforcements, motivating them with the fact that the enemy offensive would be unleashed within a few days, but Cadorna replied curtly that he already had enough troops at his disposal.

=== Hötzendorf's offensive ===
In the second half of April, General Cadorna visited the lines of the 1st Army, and became aware of the exposure of the Italian lines to a possible enemy offensive. Fearing that the entire deployment of the Army would be in crisis, he didn't feel like ordering the retreat of the troops from the forward positions to those behind. Cadorna, not satisfied with the use of reinforcements already granted, and not convinced of the need to grant others, on May 8, exempted Brusati from command, replacing him with the general Count Guglielmo Pecori Giraldi. Still on May 14, Cadorna, in a confidential letter written to General Ugo Brusati, Adjutant of the Field of the King, protested Roberto's dismissal with the fact that he didn't believe in the imminent Austrian offensive. A few hours later however, Ugo was blatantly denied.

In the afternoon of the same day the Austro-Hungarian artillery opened an intense blank fire on the Italian lines, firing at the same time on an arch that went from Dos Cassina to Col San Giovanni. At the dawn on May 15, the Austro-Hungarian troops went on the offensive, easily overwhelming the advanced positions of the 1st Army and the troops deployed there in Val Lagarina, Monte Maronia and at Val d'Astico. The enemy troops swept towards the Venetian plain, and it took four weeks of dramatic and uncertain fighting for Cadorna to be able to stop them, bringing in huge reinforcements from the Isonzo River. Faced with public unrest, and while the battle was in full swing, the government and the Supreme Command sought the scapegoat. On May 25, a press release from the Stefani agency announced, with unusual relief, that the Council of Ministers had placed General Brusati at rest with the Lieutenancy Decree of May 25, 1916. It was a very serious provision, omitting that the exemption took place a week before the enemy attack. In addition, Cadorna court-martialed Brusati on charges of treason, based on Chapter 1, Article 72, Paragraph 7 of the Military Criminal Code in time of war. However while the Court-Martial never met, public opinion was led to believe that Brusati had serious faults in the Army and was the subject of a smear campaign, which neither the government, nor the Supreme Command intervened to stop. There were even rumors that his son was fighting within the Austro-Hungarian Army. The police could no longer guarantee his safety and he had to go into hiding. Considering himself a victim, he closed himself in indignant silence, so as not to disturb the national war effort.

== After the war ==
After the war, Roberto requested for full justice to be done. On September 2, 1919, the Commission chaired by Admiral Felice Napoleone Canevaro absolved him of all charges, revoking the retirement of authority, and re-admitting him to service with retroactive effect from 1916. Having reached the age limit, however, he was placed in the reserves. This measure did not satisfy him as he would have wanted a solemn reparation of the wrong suffered amidst so much clamor. In addition, if the recall to service canceled the retirement, he did not remove the torpedo received by Cadorna. However, at that time public opinion was unwilling to criticize and without qualms about the war, nor did he want to write a controversial publication, even though he continued to collect material in defense of him. The advent of fascism gave him new hope. On November 3, 1922, General Armando Diaz granted him the War Merit Cross which was one of his first acts as the new Minister of War and immediately promoting Brusati to the rank of General of the Army. The subsequent promotion to Marshal of Italy of Cadorna possibly meant the definitive renunciation of any possible re-examination. In 1926 he was retired for seniority and retired from being a senator in 1936. He died in Santa Margherita Ligure on November 23, 1935.

== Awards ==
- War Merit Cross (November 4, 1922)
- Order of the Crown of Italy
  - Knight (June 3, 1886)
  - Officer (December 27, 1894)
  - Commander (March 20, 1898)
  - Grand Officer (June 4, 1903)
  - Grand Cordon (December 28, 1911)
- Order of Saints Maurice and Lazarus
  - Knight (January 12, 1890)
  - Officer (January 15, 1899)
  - Commander (June 4, 1908)
  - Grand Officer (May 30, 1912)
  - Grand Cordon (August 14, 1934)
- Cross of Military Seniority
