= Monte Corno Battisti =

Mountain in Italy

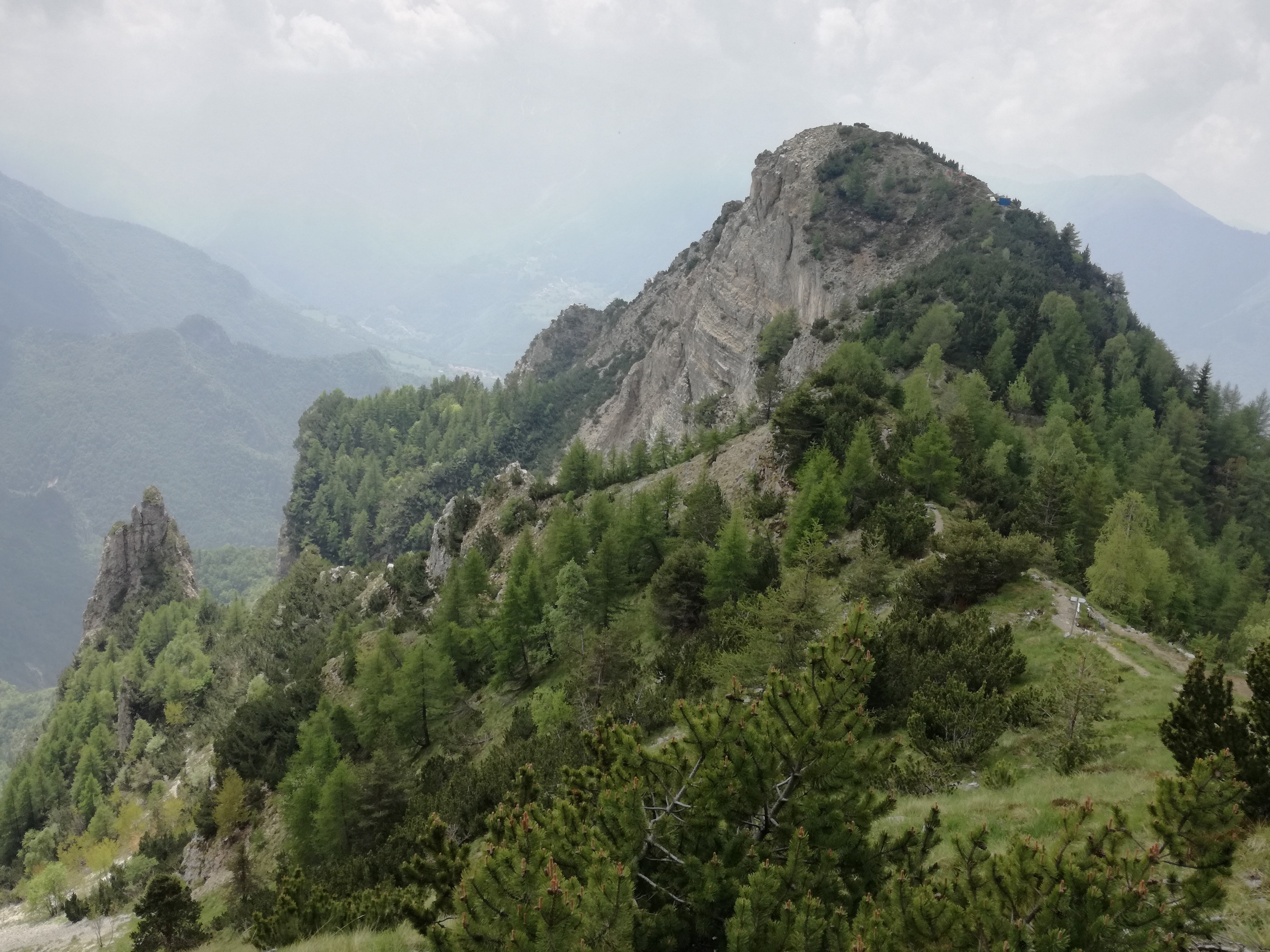

Highest point
- Elevation: 1,778 m (5,833 ft)

Geography
- Location: Trentino, Italy
- Parent range: Vicentine Alps

Monte Corno Battisti, previously known as Monte Corno or Corno di Vallarsa, is a mountain of Trentino, Italy, with an elevation of 1,778 metres (5,833 ft). It is part of the Pasubio massif in the Vicentine Alps, in the Province of Trento.

Overlooking the Vallarsa and close to the border between Trentino and Veneto, which until 1918 marked the border between the Austro-Hungarian Empire and the Kingdom of Italy, Monte Corno was the theatre of heavy fighting in the First World War, especially during the battle of Asiago; it changed hands three times between 1916 and 1918, being finally seized by Italian troops on 13 May 1918. Italian irredentist Cesare Battisti was captured on Monte Corno on 10 July 1916 and executed by the Austro-Hungarians for treason (as he was an Austro-Hungarian citizen); the mountain was renamed Corno Battisti in his honor.

Tunnels and other remnants of the war can be seen to this day. A via ferrata named after Franco Galli was created in 1987, using some of the tunnels.
