= Col San Giovanni =

- Frazione
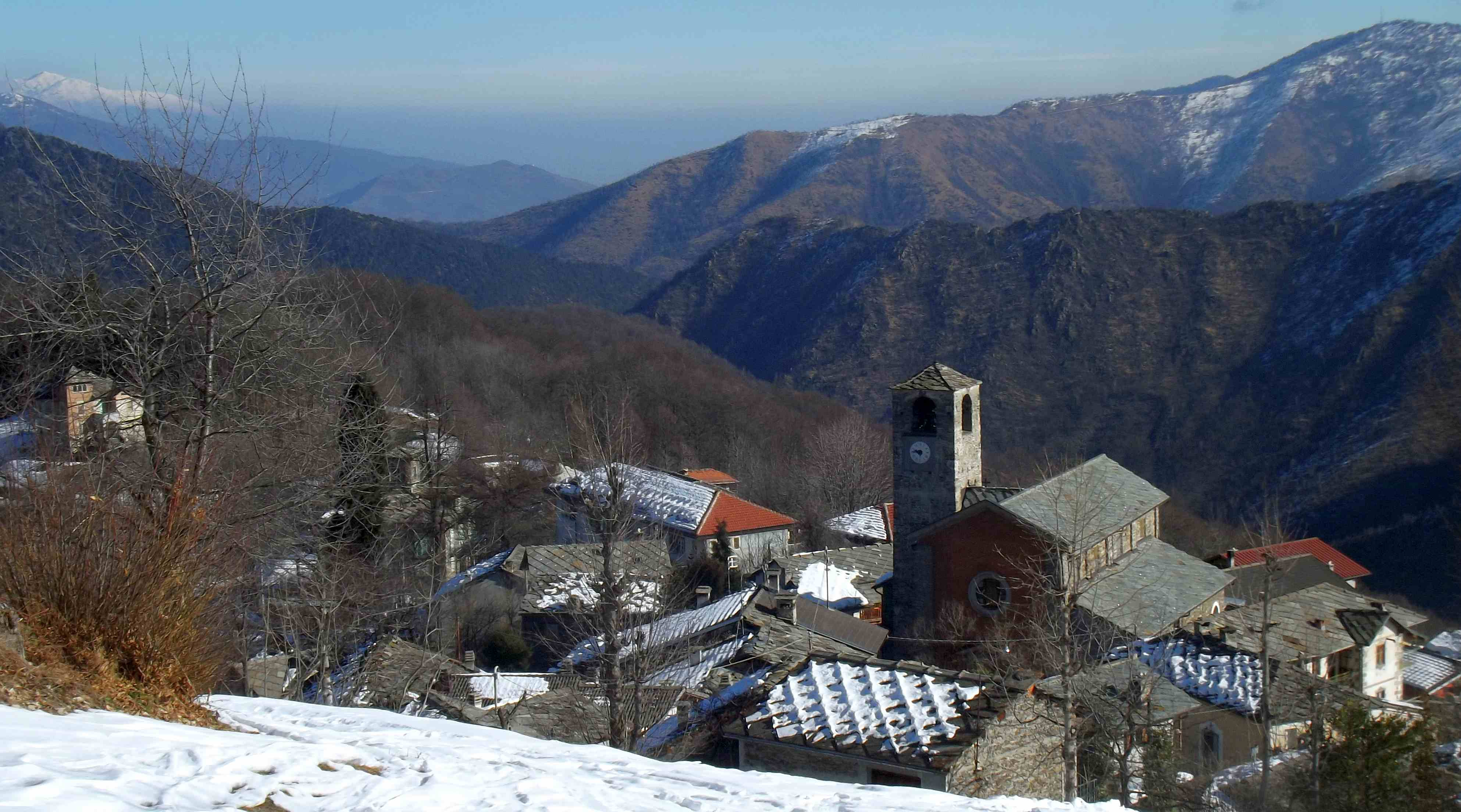
- Panorama from punta Sourela

- Location of Col San Giovanni in Italy
- Coordinates: 45°12′56″N 7°22′38″E
- Country: Italy
- Region: Piedmont
- Province: Turin (TO)
- Comune: Viù
- Elevation: 1,118 m (3,668 ft)

Population (2001)
  - Total: 55
- Time zone: UTC+1 (CET)
  - Summer (DST): UTC+2 (CEST)
- Postal code: 10070
- Dialing code: (+39) 0123

Col San Giovanni is a frazione (and a parish) of the municipality of Viù, in Piedmont, northern Italy.

== Name ==
In former times the village was named Collis ad sancti Joannis or Collo di San Giovanni.

== History ==
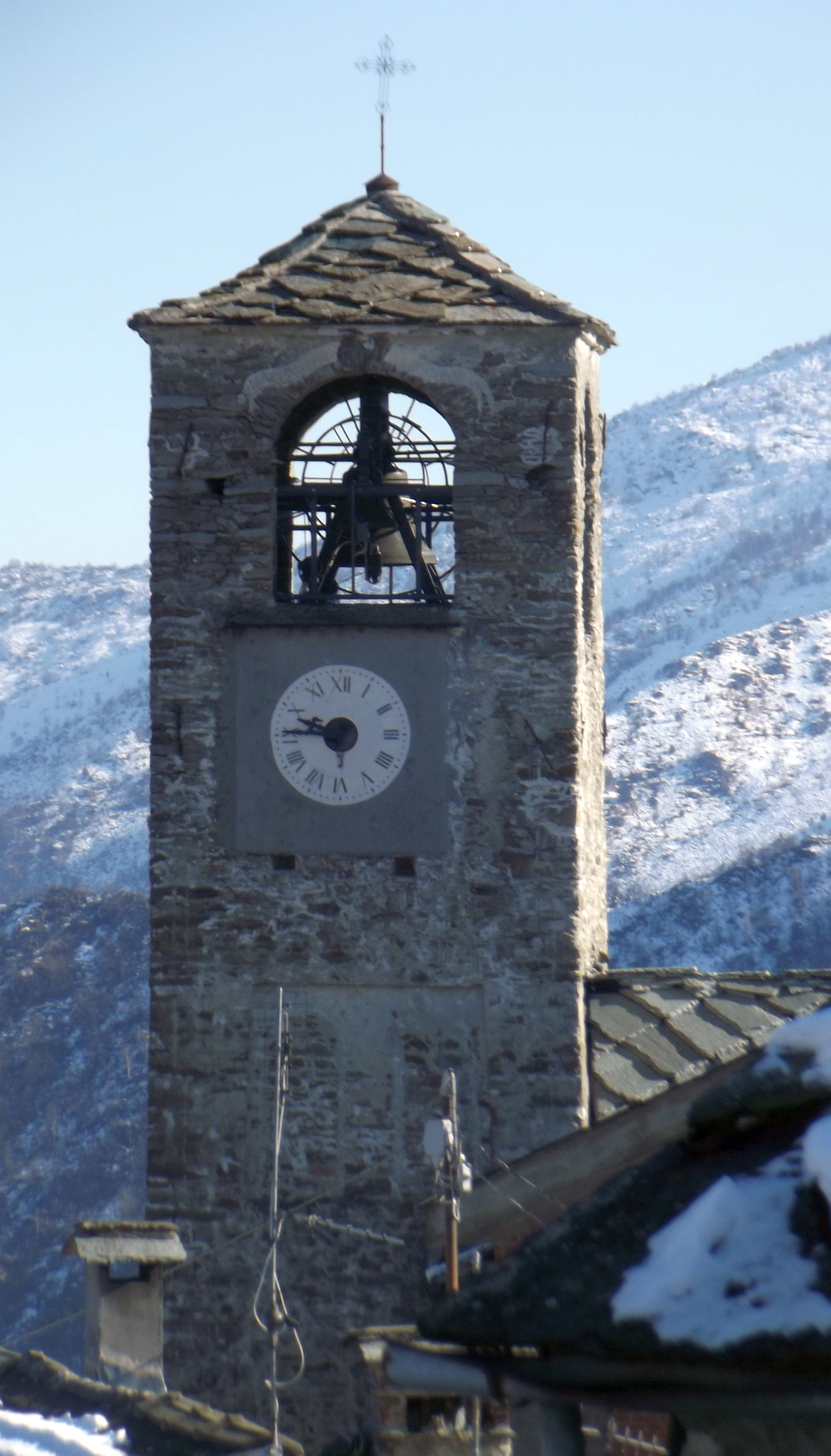
Church tower

Col San Giovanni was first mentioned in a document signed in 1011 by Landolfo, archbishop of Turin.

Since 1927 it was a separate comune (municipality).

== Relevant buildings ==
The local church was built from 1614 on the site of a previous one and it was renovated in 1922 to allow the transit of a new road. Its bell tower is the oldest of the Lanzo Valleys and was built at the end of the 11th century.
