= Vittorio Italico Zupelli =

Italian politician and officer (1859–1945)

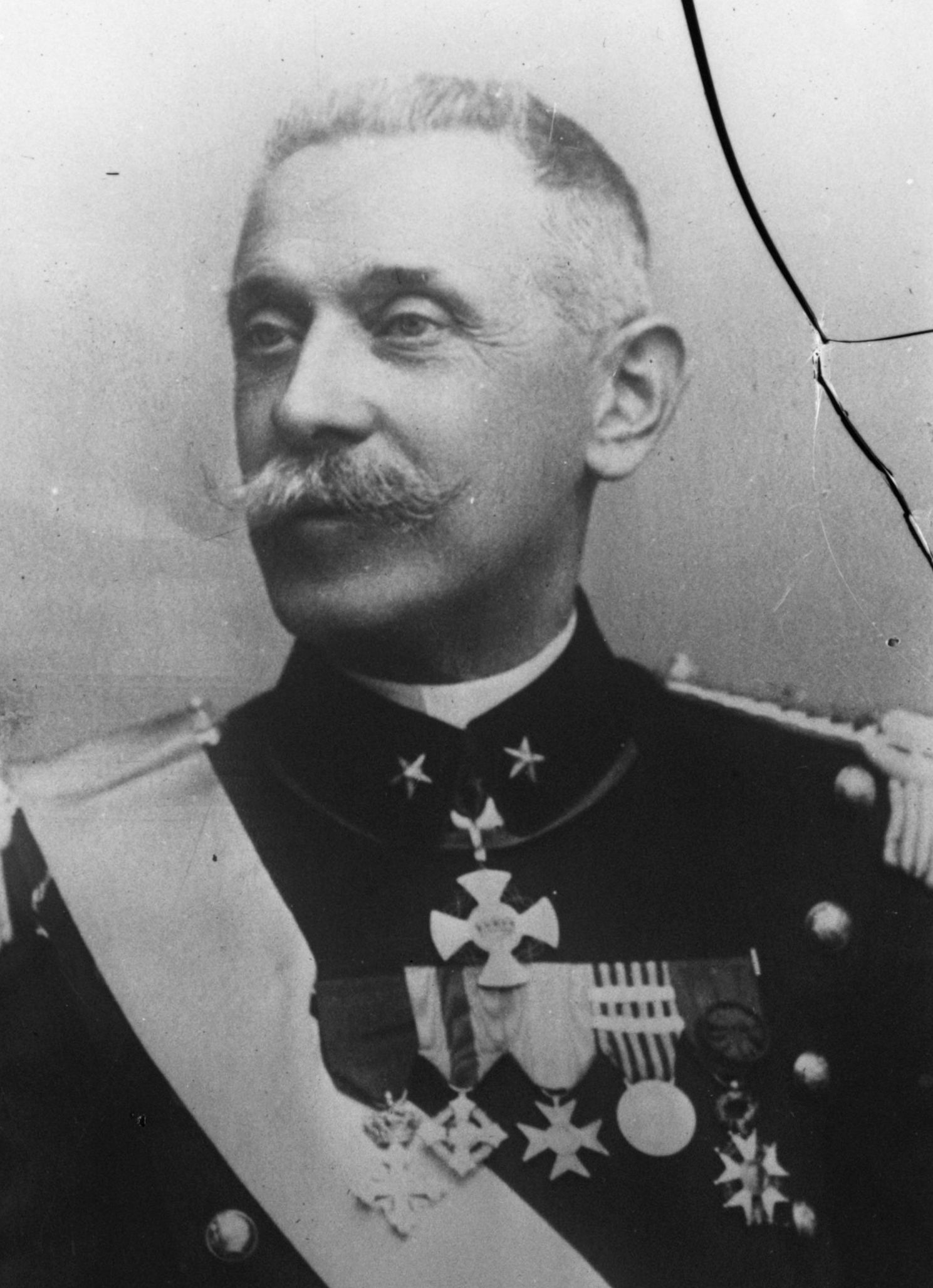

Senator
- In office 15 November 1914 – 22 January 1945

Minister of War
- In office 11 October 1914 – 4 April 1916
- Preceded by: Domenico Grandi
- Succeeded by: Paolo Morrone
- In office 21 March 1918 – 17 January 1919
- Preceded by: Vittorio Luigi Alfieri
- Succeeded by: Enrico Caviglia

Minister of Arms and Munitions
- In office 15 May 1918 – 15 September 1918

Minister of Military Assistance and War Pensions
- In office 1 January 1919 – 17 January 1919

Vittorio Italico Zupelli also known as Vittorio Zupelli, Vittorio Zuppelli and as Elio Vittorio Italico Zupelli (Koper, 6 March 1859 – Rome, 22 January 1945) was an Italian general and politician. He was the first Istrian to be appointed general of the Royal Italian Army and to hold the position of minister of the Kingdom of Italy. He was Minister of War twice, once when Italy entered the World War I in May 1915, and again at the time of the Armistice of 11 November 1918.

== Early life ==
Zupelli was born in the Austrian town of Koper to a middle-class family, with no military traditions. His father Giuseppe, a man of irredentist views, was a teacher at the Imperial Regio Ginnasio Giustinopolitano, which Vittorio Italico attended.

Upon the death of his father in 1871 the family moved to Udine in Italy. Since Vittorio had been born abroad, he had to apply for Italian citizenship before he could enroll at the Military Academy of Modena in 1877 where he attended the officers' course. He graduated with rank of sub-lieutenant of artillery in 1881. He then went on to the Royal Academy of Turin, from which he graduated as captain in 1888. In 1899 he was appointed lieutenant colonel and eight years later colonel, seconded to the Ministry of War in Rome.

== Libya and Berlin ==
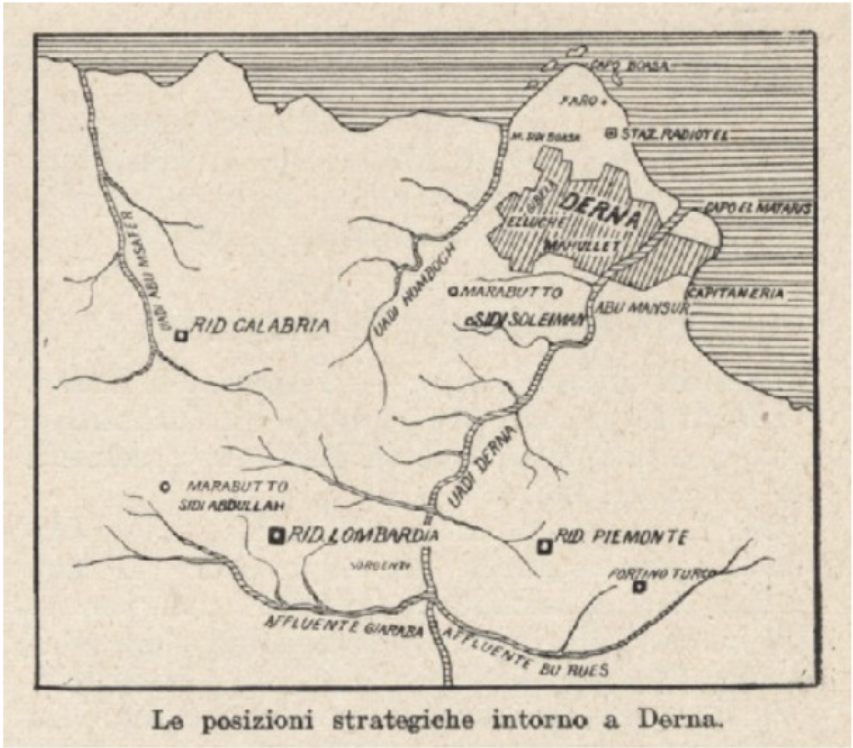
Derna and its surroundings during the Italo-Turkish War, 1912

During the Italo-Turkish War Zupelli was sent to Libya in October 1911. There he distinguished himself in the conquest of Derna which he made possible by occupying the drinking water outside the city. In November he was appointed chief of staff to General Pietro Frugoni, commander of the X Special Army Corps. Zupelli distinguished himself not only for the punctual supply of equipment, supplies and ammunition to the troops, but also for his logistical coordination in the difficult conditions of Libya. Recalled to Rome before the end of hostilities, he was appointed major general in 1912.

In 1912 the Triple Alliance with the German Empire and Austria-Hungary was due for renewal. Under this treaty Italy was obliged to provide military assistance to Germany in the event of an attack by France. At the same time the outbreak of the First Balkan War prompted Germany to consider the possibility of a general European mobilisation that would trigger the provisions of the Triple Alliance, and sought to establish how far Italy would be able to meet their obligations. Chief of Staff Alberto Pollio therefore sent Zupelli as his personal envoy on a secret mission to Berlin make Italy's position clear.

Zuppelli's message was that the war in Libya had tied up a great deal of Italian resources. Italy was not confident that her troops could pass through Austria-Hungary to reach the Rhine and support Germany; equally a route through Switzerland did not seem feasible. The French had also massively fortified their Alpine border with Italy, making progress on that front effectively impossible too. When Moltke pressed Zupelli to say precisely what military commitments Italy was prepared to make, he remained evasive but affirmed that Italy would enter the war in the event that Germany was attacked by France.

== First term as Minister of War ==
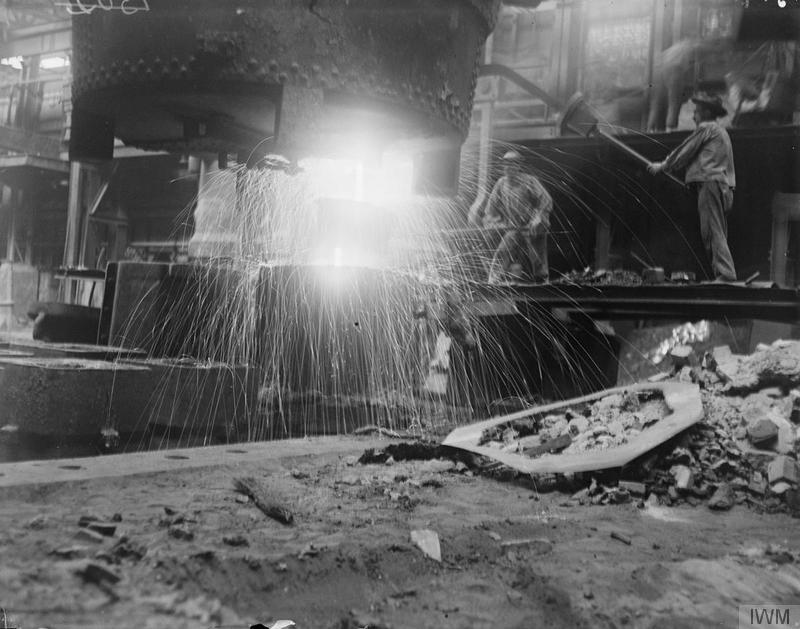
Workers pouring molten metal into gun molds in an iron foundry at an Italian munitions factory

In the summer of 1914 the First World War broke out and for ten months Italy remained uninvolved. On 11 October 1914, the Minister of War, Domenico Grandi, resigned and Prime Minister Antonio Salandra appointed Zupelli in his place on the recommendation of Chief of Staff Luigi Cadorna. On 15 November Zupelli also became, by royal appointment, senator of the Kingdom.

Despite the assurances he had given in Berlin two years previously, Zupelli was now convinced that Italy would eventually enter the war alongside the Triple Entente and he began urgent war preparations from the winter of 1914–15. He promised Britain and France that Italy would be able to mobilise one million men to join the fighting within 23 days of mobilisation.

As Minister of War Zupelli worked closely with Cadorna on the so-called Cadorna-Zupelli program in October 1914, with which the Italian troops stationed in Libya and Albania were to be upgraded in preparation for Italian entry into the First World War. The plan also involved a general rearmament of the armed forces, which were to be brought up to 1,400,000 men in strength and reinforced by additional artillery units. The plan was largely implemented through a generous increase in the military budget until Italy entered the war in May 1915, even if significant shortcomings and backlogs remained.

Both Zupelli and Cadorna rejected Salandra's demand for entry into the war in December 1914 or January 1915 at the latest. Both agreed that the Italian armed forces were far from ready for action before well into the spring of 1915. Zupelli also did not give way to Foreign Minister Sidney Sonnino's urging in February 1915 for a general mobilization as soon as possible and replied that such a move could not be ordered before April.

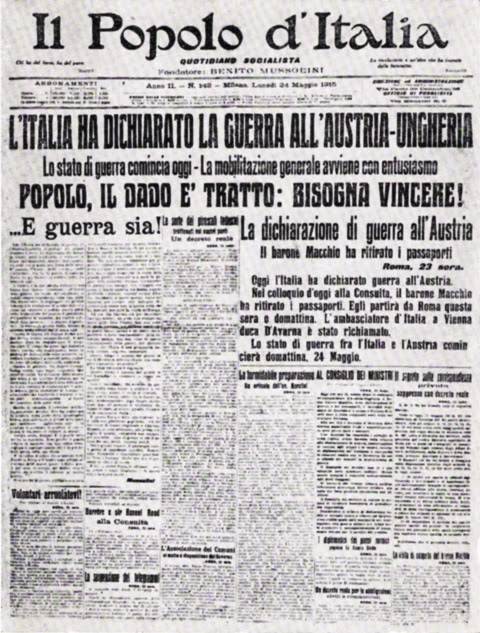
newspaper headline on the day Italy declared war

With Italy's declaration of war on Austria-Hungary in May 1915 Zupelli brought in a man he trusted, General Alfredo Dallolio, as undersecretary of the Ministry of War with responsibility for armaments.

In June 1915, when Mussolini was agitating in support of the war, Zupelli sent the following ministerial circular to the commands of the various army corps and divisions: “This ministry understands that... interventionist revolutionary fasci are carrying out active propaganda among their members who have been conscripted or voluntarily enlisted... Prof. Mussolini is the head of this movement... it is essential that discreet and energetic steps be taken to entirely prevent such insane propaganda from penetrating the ranks of the army everywhere" (extract from circular n. 2025 of 10 June 1915). Zupelli also rejected the request from Mussolini to volunteer as an officer.

Gabriele D’Annunzio also wrote to Zupelli in May 1915, asking to be commissioned as an officer of the Novara lancers, and enclosing a copy of the second edition of his it:Laudi with a personal dedication. His request was successful.

One of Zupelli's ministerial initiatives was to allow Jewish chaplains in the Italian army for the first time.

== Clash with Cadorna and resignation ==
Zupelli clashed on several occasions with Chief of Staff Luigi Cadorna. He opposed Cadorna's plan to conquer Trieste by diverting three hundred thousand men from the Isonzo front; he was against Cadorna's proposal to being in large numbers of colonial askari troops to fight in the Alpine front, and had also objected to his plan to prematurely call up the class of 1896 to arms and establish eight new divisions to be used in the spring of 1916.

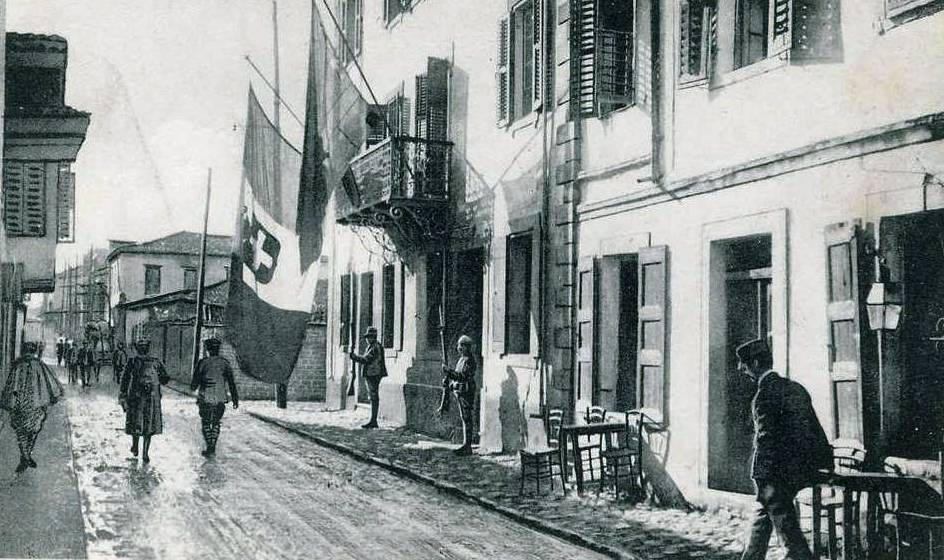
Valona (Vlorë) under Italian occupation

More serious differences of opinion emerged over Italian engagement in Albania. In late 1915 Zupelli, along with Salandra, Sonnino and other members of the cabinet wanted to break the impasse on the Isonzo front with an expedition to expand Italy's foothold in Albania. Cadorna objected that this was a dangerous distraction from the main theatre of war. He was therefore removed from the chain of command for the expedition which was undertaken by Zupelli instead. All of Cadorna's warnings were proved correct when the expeditionary force failed in its attempt to expand from its bridgehead at Valona (Vlorë) towards Durazzo (Durrës). By the end of February 1916 Italian troops were back at Valona, where they remained, essentially doing nothing, until the end of the war.

Unchastened by this reversal, Zupelli came up with another plan to achieve a breakthrough with Austria-Hungary. He pointed out to the cabinet that future offensives on the Isonzo would probably not do any better than those in the past; instead, he suggested a concentrated attack on a 12 kilometre front to take Trieste. Sonnino wanted to get rid of Cadorna, so he supported Zupelli's plan and added a proposal for a war council instead of allowing Cadorna to continue in sole command. With cabinet agreement, Zupelli was sent to put these ideas to Cadorna who responded with fury and refused to share his military authority with anyone.

Instead Cadorna insisted that Salandra to get rid of Zupelli. Cadorna's threat to resign himself if Zupelli was not removed and three weeks of pressure from the fanatically pro-Cadorna press, led to Zupelli's resignation (16 March 1916, made public only on the following 4 April). Now free from political commitment, Zupelli requested and was granted permission to go to the front in command of a division in the upper Isonzo area.

== Second term as Minister of War ==
Cadorna himself resigned in November 1917 after the disastrous defeat at Caporetto, and on 20 March 1918, Prime Minister Vittorio Emanuele Orlando, decided to replace the War Minister Vittorio Luigi Alfieri. Zupelli was recalled to hold this position for the second time.

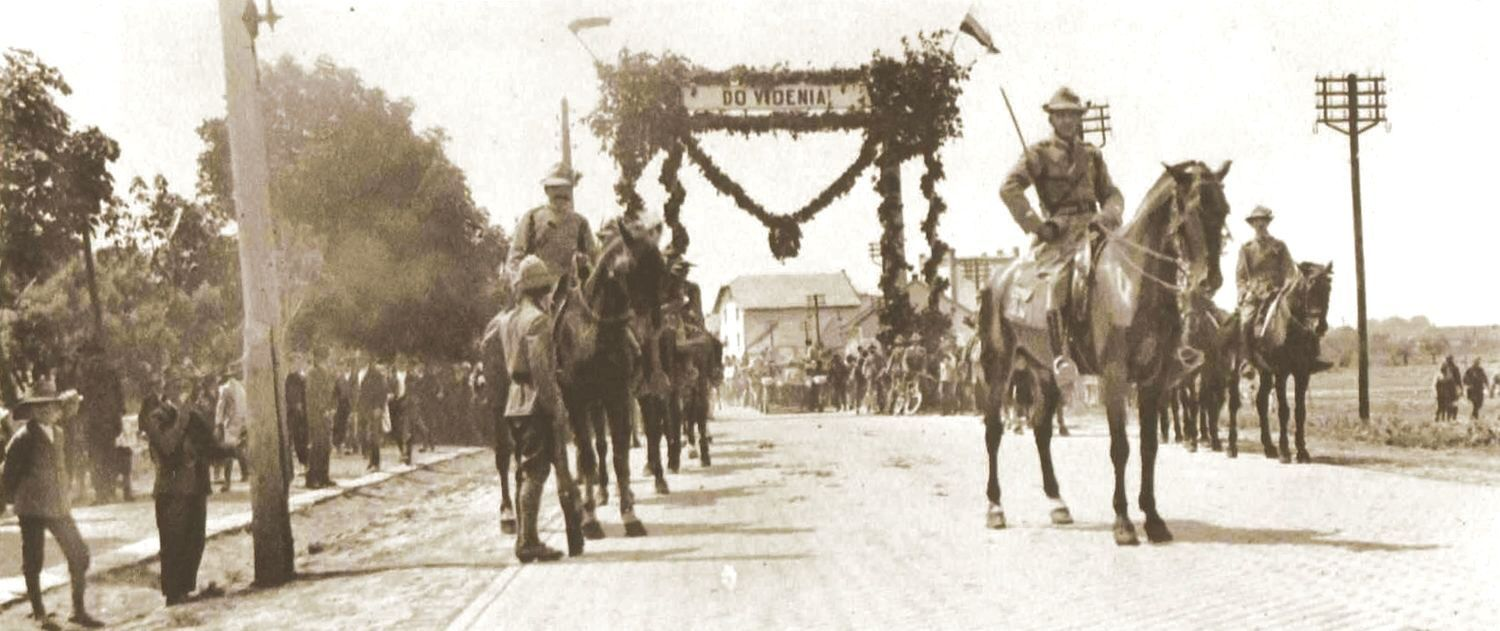
Czechoslovak Legion in Italy leaving for the Polish front, 1919

One of Zupelli's earliest actions as minister was to sign an agreement with Prime Minister Orlando and Milan Rastislav Štefánik of the Czechoslovak National Council allowing the formation of a Czechoslovak Legion in Italy from Austria-Hungarian prisoners of war in Italy. This was the first treaty that recognised the National Council as a sovereign political body and de facto national government.

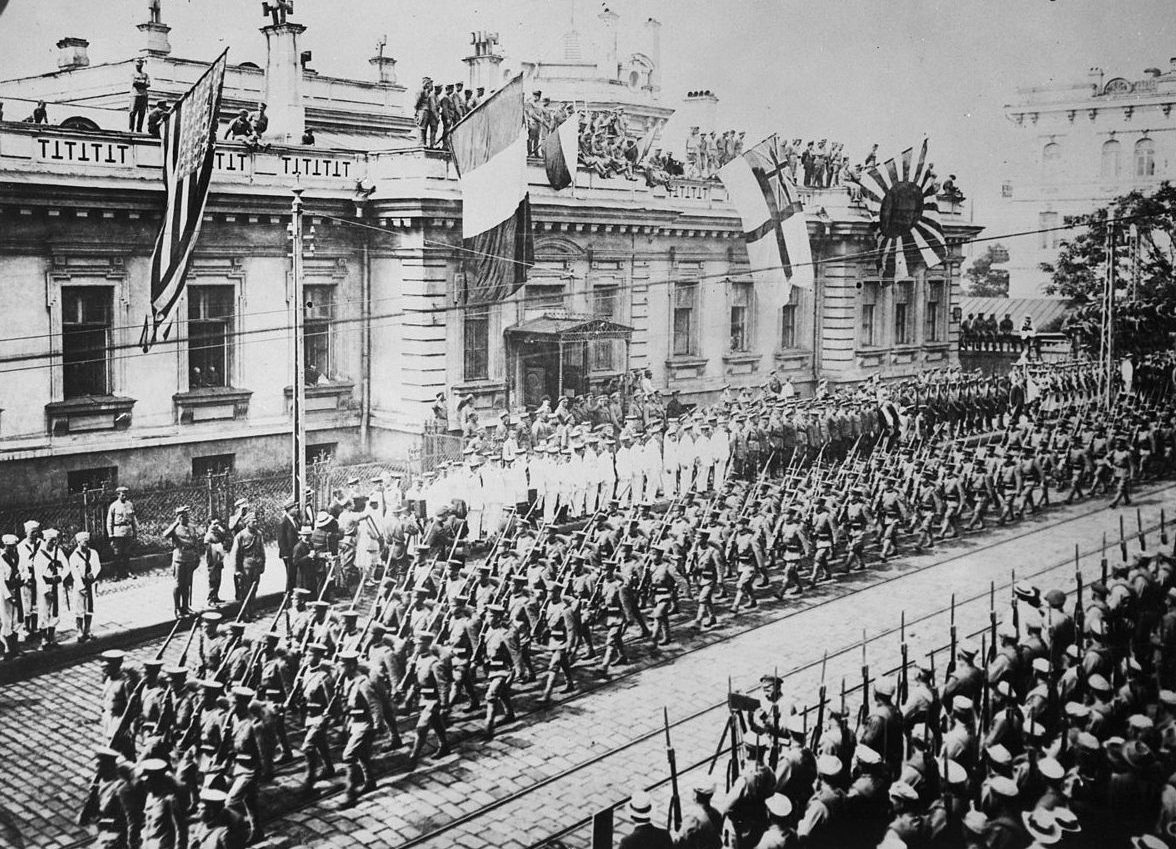
Legione redenta in Siberia

As well as allowing the formation of a Czechoslovak army in Italy, Zupelli also authorised the formation of the Legione Redenta, made up of ethnically Italian men from Austria-Hungary who had fought in the Hapsburg army, been taken prisoner by the Russians, and then released. The Legione Redenta joined a small expeditionary force that Zupelli had dispatched from Naples to the Italian concession of Tianjin in July 1918. From Tianjin they redeployed to Vladivostok, fighting the Bolsheviks in 1919.

Another task Zupelli had to take charge of in his second ministerial term was the provision of Italian military labourers to support the front in France. France had for years been urging a reluctant Italy to send manpower to fill the gaps in its own badly depleted labour force; after direct French military support for Italy after Caporetto, these demands grew more insistent. On 25 May 1918 France and Italy signed an agreement under which Italy agreed to provide 3,000 military labourers to support the American Expeditionary Forces in France. The Italians filled these numbers with men they considered unfit for frontline duty, including serial deserters. They were sent first to Arcachon where they worked keeping American troops supplied and later to Montierchaume to build a military camp for the U.S. army.

In addition to his main cabinet duties Zupelli also served in two junior ministerial roles on an interim basis, as Minister of Arms and Munitions after the resignation of Dallolio (15 May-15 September 2918) and as Minister of Military Assistance and War Pensions (1–17 January 1919).

== Vice President of the Senate ==
In early 1919 Zupelli's ministerial career ended and he returned to being an ordinary senator. In 1922 he coldly welcomed the appointment of Benito Mussolini as prime minister by king Vittorio Emanuele III, following the March on Rome. Of monarchist and conservative tendencies, Zupelli had little sympathy for Mussolini and did not trust him. Zupelli has even been defined as a "fierce anti-fascist".

In May 1924 he was appointed vice president of the Senate. He presided over the final part of the Senate investigative commission in the High Court of Justice, which on 12 June 1925 led to the acquittal of Emilio De Bono in the Matteotti trial.

The position of vice president of the Senate was held by General Zupelli until January 1934. After this he occasionally attended senate sessions until the beginning of the Second World War.

== Final years ==
A few weeks before the fall of fascism (25 July 1943), Zupelli visited king Vittorio Emanuele III together with Admiral Thaon di Revel to try to find a way out of Italy's military and political crisis by ousting Mussolini. However neither he nor the admiral "was willing to take the risks of taking the first step without an explicit order or at least without it being made clear enough to them that they would be supported” and the king could not be persuaded to take a lead, so nothing came of their meeting.

Zupelli died in January 1945 in Rome, recently liberated from Nazi occupation.

== Honours ==
Cavaliere di Gran Croce decorato di Gran Cordone dell'Ordine dei Santi Maurizio e Lazzaro – ribbon for ordinary uniform

Grand Cordon of the Order of Saints Maurice and Lazarus

Cavaliere di Gran Croce decorato di Gran Cordone dell'Ordine della Corona d'Italia – ribbon for ordinary uniform

Grand Cordon of the Order of the Crown of Italy

Cavaliere dell'Ordine militare di Savoia – ribbon for ordinary uniform

Knight of the Military Order of Savoy
