= Tonezza del Cimone =

- Comune
- Comune di Tonezza del Cimone
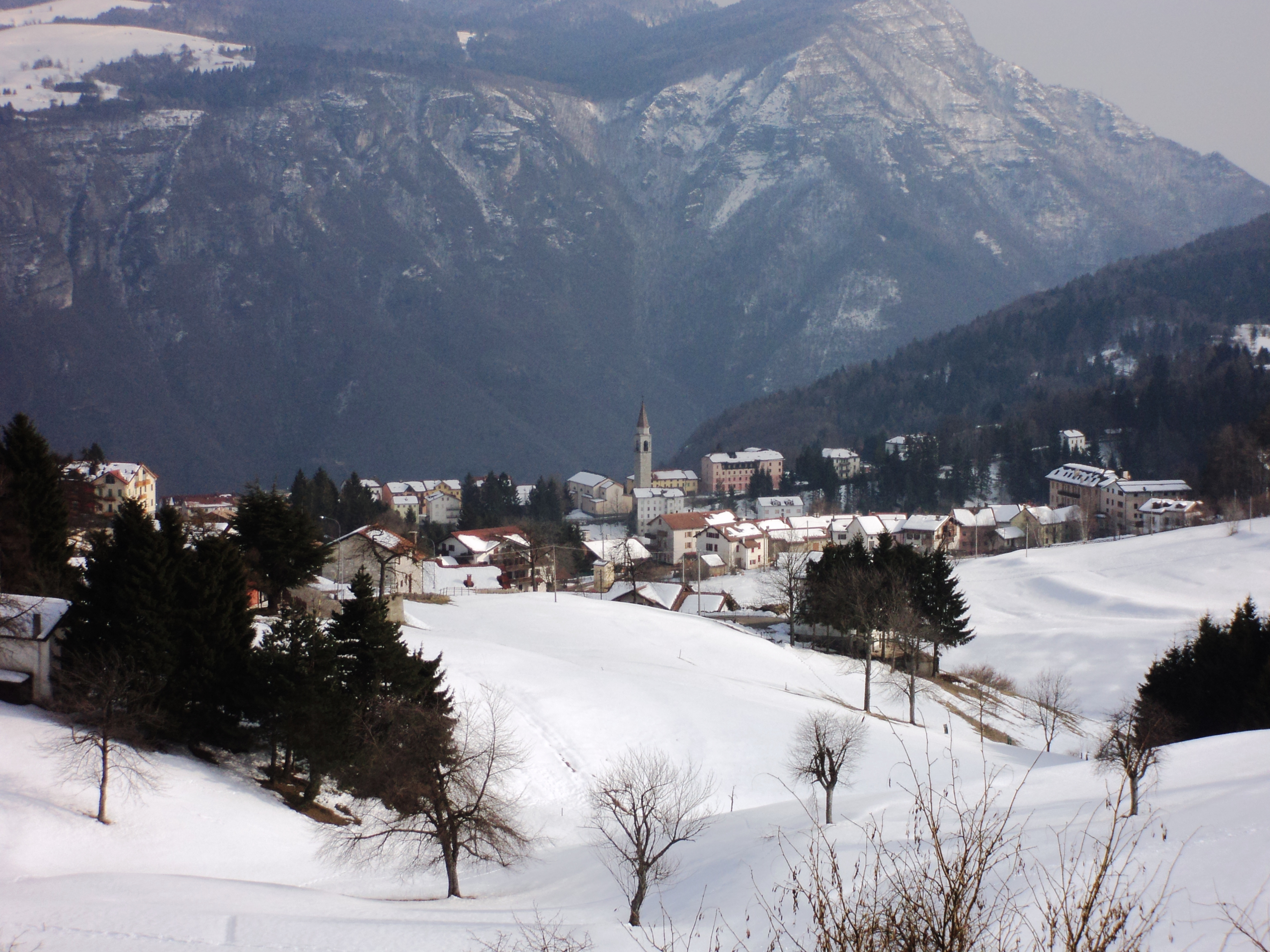
- View of Tonezza del Cimone

- Location within Italy Location within Veneto
- Coordinates: 45°51′N 11°21′E
- Country: Italy
- Region: Veneto
- Province: Vicenza (VI)

Government
  - Mayor: Diego Dalla Via

Area
  - Total: 14 km^{2} (5.4 sq mi)
- Elevation: 991 m (3,251 ft)

Population (1 January 2017)
  - Total: 525
  - Density: 38/km^{2} (97/sq mi)
- Demonym: Tonezzani
- Time zone: UTC+1 (CET)
  - Summer (DST): UTC+2 (CEST)
- Postal code: 36040
- Dialing code: 0445
- Website: Official website

Tonezza del Cimone (Cimbrian: Tonetsch) is a town in the province of Vicenza, Veneto, Italy. It is west of SP350 provincial road, in the Venetian Prealps, near the Monte Cimone di Tonezza.
