= Carlo Melotti =

Italian military personnel

- Born: 31 January 1882; Castelfranco Emilia, Kingdom of Italy
- Died: 20 December 1958 (aged 76); Rome, Italy
- Military career
- Allegiance: Kingdom of Italy
- Branch: Royal Italian Army
- Service years: 1899–1945
- Rank: Lieutenant General
- Commands: 1st Regiment "Granatieri di Sardegna"; 6th Infantry Brigade; 6th Infantry Division "Cuneo"
- Conflicts: Italo-Turkish War; World War I; Battles of the Isonzo; Battle of Asiago; World War II; Battle of the Western Alps; Greco-Italian War
- Awards: Silver Medal of Military Valor (three times); Bronze Medal of Military Valor; War Merit Cross; Military Order of Savoy; Croix de guerre 1914-1918

Carlo Melotti (Castelfranco Emilia, 31 January 1882 – Rome, 20 December 1958) was an Italian general during World War II.

== Biography ==
He was born on January 31, 1882, in Castelfranco Emilia, in the province of Modena. After enlisting in the Royal Italian Army, he trained as sergeant from 30 December 1899 to 29 June 1901 and was assigned to the 1st Regiment "Granatieri di Sardegna". Between 1903 and 7 September 1905 he attended the Royal Military Academy of Infantry and Cavalry in Modena, graduating with the rank of infantry second lieutenant, assigned to the 2nd Regiment "Granatieri di Sardegna". At his own request, on 9 April 1908 he was transferred to the Royal Corps of Colonial Troops of Eritrea, being assigned to the 3rd Colonial Battalion. Returning to Italy on 13 September 1908, he was promoted to lieutenant and transferred back to the 3rd Battalion of the 2nd "Grenadiers of Sardinia" Regiment, with which he served in Tripolitania during the Italo-Turkish War, remaining there from 28 October 1911 to 24 April 1912.

After promotion to captain on 31 December 1914, he was assigned to the 1st Regiment "Granatieri di Sardegna" when the Kingdom of Italy entered World War I on 24 May 1915, and participated in the early battles of the Isonzo, where he was wounded in action on 21 August 1915. He later participated in the battle of Monte Cengio as aide-de-camp to General Giuseppe Pennella, commander of the "Granatieri di Sardegna" Brigade, distinguishing himself during the battle of Asiago in May–June 1916. Afterwards he returned to the Isonzo Front, and by the end of 1916 he was among the very few surviving grenadier officers, and had been awarded three silver medals and two bronze medals for military valor as well as two war merit crosses. On 8 July 1917 he was promoted to major, and in August he left again for Tripolitania at the command of the 3rd Battalion of the 1st Grenadiers Regiment. On 18 June 1919 he returned to Italy and in September he was transferred to the Ministry of War for special assignments, being promoted to the rank of lieutenant colonel on 1 September 1920, and then to that of colonel on 1 June 1928.

On 1 May 1930 he was appointed commander of the 1st Regiment "Granatieri di Sardegna", and in 1934-1935 he commanded the Italian contingent deployed in the Saar during the 1935 Saar status referendum. He remained in command of the regiment until March 2, 1935, when he was transferred to the command of the Army Corps of Rome. From the following 22 July he was appointed head of the liaison office between the Royal Italian Army and the Volunteer Militia for National Security, and from 8 September 1936 he assumed command of the 6th Infantry Brigade in Milan. After promotion to brigadier general on 1 January 1937, he was appointed deputy commander of the 6th Infantry Division "Legnano" in Milan, a post he left the following July to take on that of deputy commander of the 21st Infantry Division "Granatieri di Sardegna" in Rome. From 12 September 1938 he held the presidency of the Infantry Weapons Inspectorate, and on 19 July 1939 he was promoted to major general.

On 16 November 1939 he assumed command of the 6th Infantry Division "Cuneo", which, after Italy entered the Second World War on June 10, 1940, was heavily engaged in the Battle of the Western Alps, and subsequently on the Greek-Albanian front from 22 December 1940. In July 1941, following the fall of Greece, the Division was transferred to the Cyclades and the Sporades islands for garrison duty, and Melotti established his headquarters in the island of Samos. On January 31, 1942, he was transferred to the Army reserve due to reaching age limits, and was repatriated. On May 26, 1942, he was awarded the honor of Knight of the Military Order of Savoy and promoted to lieutenant general. Following the Armistice of Cassibile he escaped capture by the Germans in Castelfranco Emilia, and reached Allied-controlled territory on 31 July 1944.

After the war he served as President of the National Grenadiers of Sardinia Association (replacing General Ugo Bignami) from 18 December 1945 to 20 December 1958, promoting the construction of a memorial for the soldiers killed during the defense of Rome in September 1943 near Porta Capena and another on Monte Cengio honoring the grenadiers killed there during the battle of Asiago. He died suddenly in Rome on December 20, 1958, at the age of 76.
