= Stefano Castagnola =

Italian lawyer, politician and mayor (1825–1891)

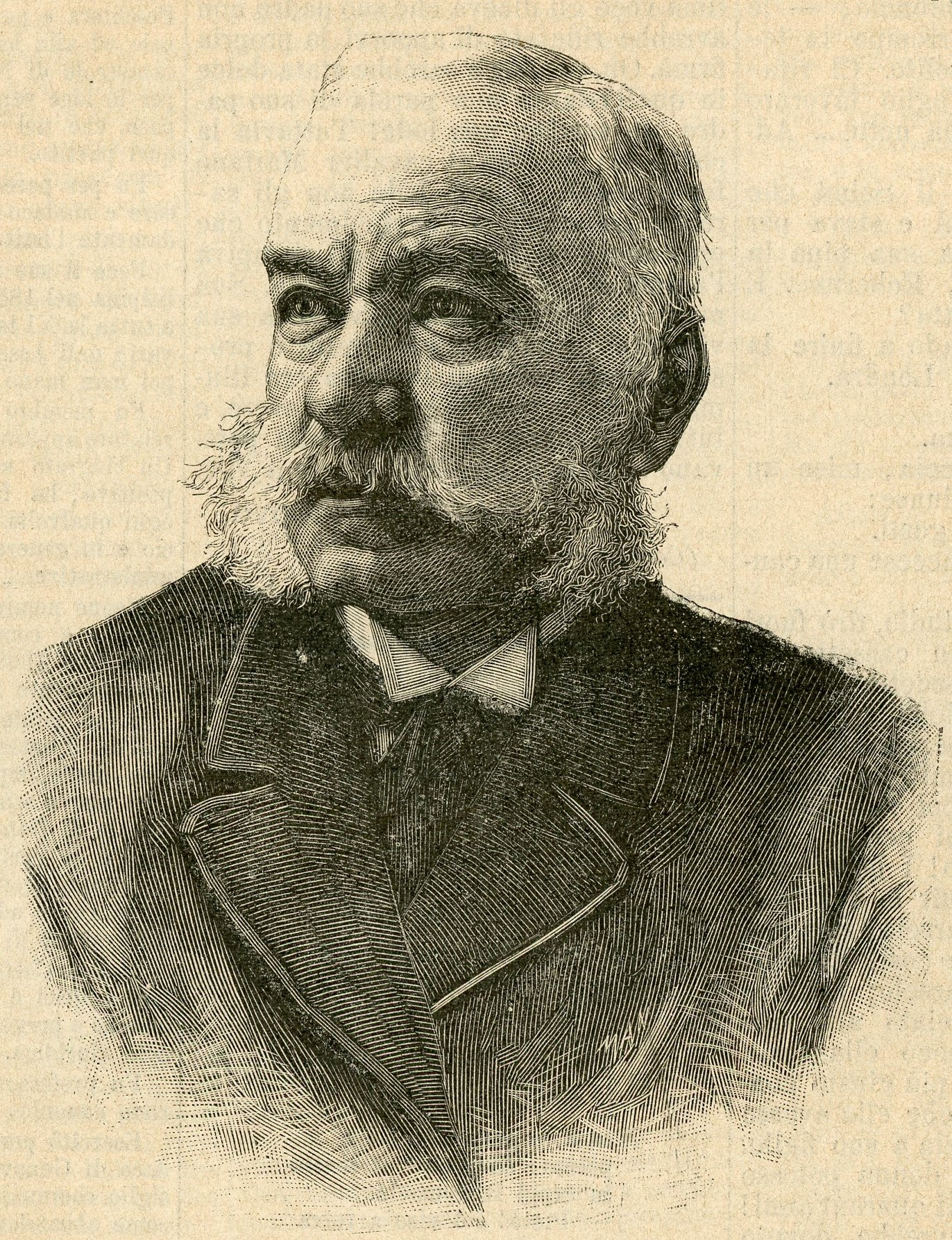

Minister of Agriculture
- In office 14 December 1869 – 10 July 1873
- Preceded by: Marco Minghetti
- Succeeded by: Gaspare Finali

Minister of the Navy, interim
- In office 14 December 1869 – 15 January 1870
- Preceded by: Augusto Riboty
- Succeeded by: Guglielmo Acton

Mayor of Genoa
- In office 27 May 1888 – 28 February 1891
- Preceded by: Riccardo Pavesi
- Succeeded by: Giacomo Doria

Member of the Chamber of Deputies of the Kingdom of Sardinia
- In office 14 December 1857 – 21 January 1860

Member of the Chamber of Deputies
- In office 8 February 1861 – 3 October 1876

Senator
- In office 2 March 1889 – 11 September 1891

Stefano Castagnola (Chiavari, 3 August 1825 – Genoa, 11 September 1891) was an Italian lawyer and politician. He served as Minister of Agriculture in the Lanza cabinet, as well as Minister of the Navy and Minister of Public Works on an interim basis.

== Early life ==
Stefano was the son of Giovanni Castagnola, a lawyer and member of the Royal Genoese Senate, and his wife Giovanetta Solari. In 1847 he graduated in law from the University of Genoa where he mixed in radical political circles, meeting Nino Bixio, Girolamo Ramorino and Goffredo Mameli. In 1848, he volunteered for the army and took part in the siege of Peschiera del Garda, as well as in a number of battles including Goito, Governolo and Custoza.

After the war was over he returned to Genoa and became active in Mazzini's party. He also often represented political defendants (including Nino Bixio in 1851) and radical newspapers in the courts. He was among the founders of Italia e Popolo and he promoted the it:Società di Tiro Nazionale, becoming its secretary together with it:Bartolomeo Savi.

== Parliamentary career ==
He stood for election to the Municipality of Genoa, becoming a councilor and later acting mayor. In 1857, after being forced to flee to Switzerland, he was elected from the constituency of Genoa III as a liberal-democratic deputy to the Subalpine Chamber. Although he was not elected to the next legislature, he was returned to every parliament between 1861 and 1876 from the constituency of Chiavarì; after another three-year absence he was re-elected in 1879 from the constituency of Albenga.

While he began his career sitting with the radical democrats, he increasingly moved closer to the moderates and ended up joining the parliamentary Right. This change earned him harsh attacks from his former Mazzinian companions, particularly through the Genoese newspaper it:Unità italiana e Dovere.

== Ministerial career ==
Castagnola entered the Lanza cabinet with two ministerial portfolios. The former Navy Minister Augusto Riboty had resigned with his colleagues in the third Menabrea government and his ambitious plans to build up the Italian navy had been shelved as too expensive, and Lanza wanted to adhere to strict expenditure limits. It was not immediately clear who would take this remit on while preserving the necessary regional and political balance in the cabinet. Eventually Lanza resolved this by appointing admiral Guglielmo Acton, who was found a seat in a by-election to enable him to serve. In the meantime from 14 December 1869 to 15 January 1870 Castagnola held the navy portfolio.

His main and enduring cabinet role however was as Minister of Agriculture, Industry and Commerce which he held for the duration of the government. His work as minister included promoting industrial research, establishing a shipping register and setting up postal savings banks. He worked for the abolition of common land in Sardinia, created the irrigation trusts and reformed the regulation of forestry and fishing. He established a naval high school in Genoa and schools of arts and crafts in Chiavari, Savona, Ferrara, Cagliari. In cabinet he enthusiastically supported the occupation of Rome advocated by his colleague Quintino Sella.

== Later life ==
Castagnola remained in parliament until 1876. In 1888 he ran for election as mayor of Genoa, defeating Andrea Podestà and serving until 1891. He had development work carried out in the port, and prepared for the Columbian Exhibition which took place in 1892.

He had a strong commitment to welfare and public health, attending to the care of those affected during the cholera epidemics of 1854 and 1866–67; for these efforts in 1869 he was awarded the medal of merit for public health in 1869. He also served as president of the administration of the Genoese hospitals.

In the later years of his life he dedicated himself to university teaching: first as a substitute professor in Roman law, then in charge of ecclesiastical law and then full professor of commercial law at the University of Genoa. He wrote extensively on legal topics and from 1881 to 1887 he was a member of the Council of the Bar Association of Genoa.

He was buried in the Monumental Cemetery of Staglieno where his tomb was created by it:Demetrio Paernio.

== Honours ==
Stefano Castagnola received a number of Italian and foreign honours.

Grand Cordon of the Order of the Crown of Italy - ribbon for ordinary uniform

Grand Cordon of the Order of the Crown of Italy

Commander of the Order of Saints Maurice and Lazarus - ribbon for ordinary uniform

Commander of the Order of Saints Maurice and Lazarus

Knight Grand Cross of the Imperial Order of Franz Joseph (Austria-Hungary) - ribbon for ordinary uniform

Knight Grand Cross of the Imperial Order of Franz Joseph (Austria-Hungary)

Knight Grand Cross of the Order of Christ - ribbon for ordinary uniform

Knight Grand Cross of the Order of Christ (Portugal)

Knight Grand Cross of the Order of Charles III (Spain) - ribbon for ordinary uniform

Knight Grand Cross of the Order of Charles III (Spain)
