= Third La Marmora government =

7th Government of Kingdom of Italy

La Marmora II government
- 7th Cabinet of Italy

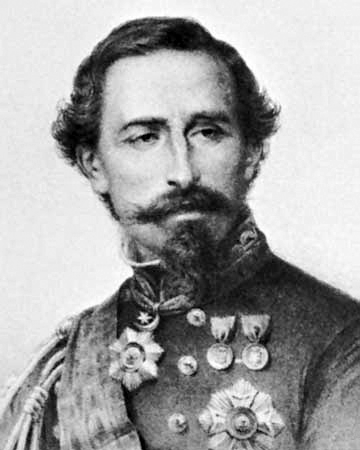
- Date formed: 31 December 1865
- Date dissolved: 20 June 1866

People and organisations
- Head of state: Victor Emmanuel II
- Head of government: Alfonso Ferrero La Marmora
- Total no. of members: 9
- Member party: Historical Right

History
- Predecessor: La Marmora II Cabinet
- Successor: Ricasoli II Cabinet

The La Marmora III government of Italy held office from 31 December 1865 until 20 June 1866, a total of 171 days, or 5 months and 20 days.

== Government parties ==
The government was composed by the following parties:

Party	Ideology	Leader
Historical Right	Conservatism	Marco Minghetti

== Composition ==
Office	Name	Party	Term
Prime Minister	Alfonso Ferrero La Marmora	Military	(1865–1866)
Minister of the Interior	Desiderato Chiaves	Historical Right	(1865–1866)
Minister of Foreign Affairs	Alfonso Ferrero La Marmora	Military	(1865–1866)
Minister of Grace and Justice	Giovanni De Falco	Independent	(1865–1866)
Minister of Finance	Antonio Scialoja	Historical Right	(1865–1866)
Minister of War	Ignazio De Genova	Military	(1865–1866)
Minister of the Navy	Diego Angioletti	Military	(1865–1866)
Minister of Agriculture, Industry and Commerce	Domenico Berti	Historical Right	(1865–1866)
Minister of Public Works	Stefano Jacini	Historical Right	(1865–1866)
Minister of Public Education	Domenico Berti	Historical Right	(1865–1866)
