= Girolamo Cantelli =

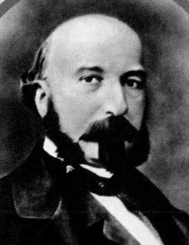

Ministry of Public Education
- In office 27 October 1867 – 18 November 1867
- Prime Minister: Luigi Federico Menabrea
- Preceded by: Michele Coppino
- Succeeded by: it:Emilio Broglio
- In office 6 February 1874 – 27 September 1874
- Prime Minister: Marco Minghetti
- Preceded by: it:Antonio Scialoja
- Succeeded by: it:Ruggiero Bonghi

Minister of the Interior
- In office 10 September 1868 – 13 May 1869
- Prime Minister: Luigi Federico Menabrea
- Preceded by: Carlo Cadorna
- Succeeded by: Luigi Ferraris
- In office 10 July 1873 – 25 March 1876
- Prime Minister: Marco Minghetti
- Preceded by: Giovanni Lanza
- Succeeded by: Giovanni Nicotera

Minister of Public Works
- In office 27 October 1867 – 5 January 1868
- Prime Minister: Luigi Federico Menabrea
- Preceded by: it:Antonio Giovanola
- Succeeded by: it:Lodovico Pasini
- In office 10 September 1868 – 13 May 1869
- Prime Minister: Luigi Federico Menabrea
- Preceded by: Lodovico Pasini
- Succeeded by: Antonio Mordini

senator
- In office 4 December 1865 – 7 December 1884

Deputy (Kingdom of Italy)
- In office 27 February 1861 – 7 September 1864

Deputy (Kingdom of Sardinia)
- In office 2 April 1860 – 17 December 1860

Count Girolamo Giuseppe Maria Gaspare Cantelli (sometimes also spelled Gerolamo Cantelli) (Parma, 22 June 1815 – Parma, 7 December 1884 ) was an Italian patriot and politician, senator and minister of the Kingdom of Italy.

== Early life in Parma ==
Girolamo’s father was count Lodovico of Rubbiano in the modern commune of Solignano and his mother was Luigiia Rizzini from a noble family in Mantua.

Born a subject of the Duchy of Parma and Piacenza, he was educated at the it: Collegio dei Nobili and trained in law. In 1845 he was chosen as podestà of Parma, a position he held under duchess Maria Luisa and Charles II. During the riots of 1848, he was a member of the regency (20-29 March 1848) and then President of the provisional government of the Duchy of Parma (11 April-14 May 1849 ), favouring the annexation of the Duchy of Parma to the Kingdom of Sardinia. When the new duke Charles III returned to the throne, Cantelli had his assets confiscated and went into exile in Genoa. He was able to return to his homeland only after duke Charles’ death. In 1859 he was elected president of the Assembly of the People's Representatives of the Duchy of Parma and played an important part in the annexation of Parma to Piedmont.

== Kingdom of Italy ==
In the new Kingdom of Italy, on 14 July 1861 Cantelli was appointed civil commissioner to the king's lieutenant, Enrico Cialdini. in the provinces of the former Kingdom of the Two Sicilies. Cantelli clashed with Cialdini who, in order to crush the resistance of the supporters of the former Bourbon kingdom, had chosen to come to terms with the left and to be able to implement repressive actions and often resort to very harsh reprisal measures. Cantelli opposed Cialdini for having relied on the left, rather than the moderates. The quarrel was not well received by Ricasoli in Turin: Cialdini resigned as lieutenant on 16 August 1861 (only to reassume it when it was rejected) but he was replaced by Giovanni Visone in 1861 and appointed prefect of Florence in 1864, a position he held until 3 November 1867. Cantelli's attitude towards the former subjects of the Grand Duchy of Tuscany was not very friendly since, in his opinion, they were not very favourable to the policies of the central government. On 8 October 1865 Cantelli was appointed senator.

https://storia.camera.it/deputato/gerolamo-cantelli-18150622

== Ministerial career ==
He served as Minister of Public Works in the First and Second Menabrea governments and as Minister of the Interior in the Second Menabrea government and the Second Minghetti governments; in the second Minghetti government, following the resignation of it:Antonio Scialoja, he also took on the role of Minister of Public Education on an interim basis.

His most controversial actions were as Minister of the Interior, which led it:Alessandro Galante Garrone to define Cantelli's policy as "obtuse persecution". His aversion to republicanism led him to have 28 republicans arrested, mostly from Romagna, including Aurelio Saffi and Alessandro Fortis), for conspiracy without even an arrest warrant, and imprisoned in the fortress of Spoleto (this event became famous as “the arrests at the Villa Ruffi”). A few days later, other arrests followed, including Andrea Costa and the Garibaldian Alberto Mario. A few months later, on 5 December 1874, Cantelli, together with Justice Minister Paolo Onorato Vigliani, presented a bill aimed at outlawing the opposition, allowing for the house arrest of opposition figures for one to five years by decree of the Minister of the Interior on the proposal of the prefect. After the fall of the Right in 1876, the new Minister of the Interior Giovanni Nicotera attacked Cantelli in the Senate not only for his authoritarian policies, but also for his illicit interventions in elections and for his covert financing of certain newspapers.

As Interior Minister one of the issues Cantelli had to deal with was the scandal of Italian emigrants being encouraged to move to Venezuela by that county’s government, only for them to be treated harshly and given very poor land to work. Cantelli unmasked the exploitative scheme and warned prospective colonists of what the might expect.

== Later years and personal life ==
In his later years Cantelli dedicated himself to the administrative life of Parma (municipal councillor and president of the provincial council of Parma). Between 1876 and 1883 he was also President of the Publishing Company of the Gazzetta di Parma. He died in Parma, his hometown, in 1884 and was buried in the Shrine of Santa Maria della Steccata.

Cantelli married Teresa Stocchi, by whom he had four sons, Antonio, Giacomo, Alberto and Marco.

== Honours ==
Grande Ufficiale dell'Ordine dei Santi Maurizio e Lazzaro - ribbon for ordinary uniform

Grande Ufficiale dell'Ordine dei Santi Maurizio e Lazzaro

Grande Cordone dell'Ordine dei Santi Maurizio e Lazzaro
— 13 maggio 1869

Gran Cordone dell'Ordine della Corona d'Italia
— 1868
