= Riboty =

Riboty may refer to:

- Augusto Riboty (1816–1888), Italian admiral and politician
- Italian destroyer Augusto Riboty, an Italian scout cruiser commissioned in 1917, reclassified as a destroyer in 1938, and scrapped in 1951
