= List of successful votes of no confidence in Italian governments =

This is a list of successful votes of no confidence in Italian governments, which resulted in their resignation or dismissal. It includes both governments who served under the Kingdom of Italy and governments who served under the Republic of Italy. The first such vote took place on 19 December 1865, while the most recent one took place on 28 January 2008.

== Practice ==
=== Kingdom of Italy ===
The Kingdom of Italy was a constitutional monarchy, in which the Council of Ministers, which exercised executive power, was appointed by the King and required parliamentary confidence in order to remain in office. Although the Italian Parliament was bicameral, being composed of both a Senate and a Chamber of Deputies (with bills needing the approval of both before becoming law), by convention the government only needed the support of the latter.

=== Republic of Italy ===
Under the Constitution of Italy, the government is appointed by the President and can only remain in office as long as it enjoys the confidence of both houses of Parliament.

== List ==
=== Kingdom of Italy ===
Assembly	Government in office	Date	Subject of motion	Result Majority against the government
Chamber of Deputies	Second La Marmora government	19 December 1865	Motion inviting the government not to enforce the Decree on the Treasury until its conversion into law by Parliament	196-1 195
Chamber of Deputies	First Menabrea government	22 December 1867	Motion of confidence	199-201 2
Chamber of Deputies	Lanza government	25 June 1873	Motion of confidence	156-86 70
Chamber of Deputies	First Cairoli government	11 December 1878	Motion of confidence	189-263 74
Chamber of Deputies	Third Depretis government	3 July 1879	Motion of no confidence	251-159 92
Chamber of Deputies	Third Cairoli government	7 April 1881	Government-backed motion to change the order of business	192-171 21
Chamber of Deputies	Second Crispi government	31 January 1891	Government-backed motion to begin consideration of the Bill on Tariffs and Taxes on Alcoholic Substances	186-193 7
Chamber of Deputies	First Di Rudinì government	5 May 1892	Motion of confidence	185-193 8
Chamber of Deputies	Third Di Rudinì government	3 December 1897	Government-backed Bill on Career Advancement in the Royal Italian Army	Unknown (Note: The number of votes for and against the proposal was not entered into the journal.)
Chamber of Deputies	Saracco government	6 February 1901	Amendment to motion	318-102 216
Chamber of Deputies	First Fortis government	17 December 1905	Conversion into law of the Decree on the Modus Vivendi with Spain	145-293 148
Chamber of Deputies	Second Fortis government	2 February 1906	Motion of confidence	188-288 100
Chamber of Deputies	First Sonnino government	17 May 1906	Motion to reject the Government's proposal to set a deadline for consideration in committee of the Bill on Southern Railways	179-152 27
Chamber of Deputies	Boselli government	25 October 1917	Motion of confidence	96-314 218
Chamber of Deputies	Orlando government	19 June 1919	Government-backed motion to sit in private	68-261 193
Chamber of Deputies	First Facta government	19 July 1922	Motion of confidence	103-288 185
Grand Council of Fascism	Mussolini government	24 July 1943	Motion calling on the King to restore the constitutional regime	19-8 11

=== Republic of Italy ===
Assembly	Government in office	Date	Subject of motion	Result Majority against the government
Chamber of Deputies	Eighth De Gasperi government	28 July 1953	Motion of confidence	263-282 19
Chamber of Deputies	First Fanfani government	30 January 1954	Motion of confidence	260-303 43
Senate of the Republic	First Andreotti government	26 February 1972	Motion of confidence	152-158 6
Senate of the Republic	Fifth Andreotti government	30 March 1979	Motion of confidence	149-150 1
Chamber of Deputies	Sixth Fanfani government	28 April 1987	Motion of confidence	131-240 109
Chamber of Deputies	First Prodi government	9 October 1998	Motion of confidence	312-313 1
Senate of the Republic	Second Prodi government	24 January 2008	Motion of confidence	156-161 5
