= Paolo Cortese =

Italian politician

Minister of Justice
- In office 10 August 1865 – 31 December 1865
- Prime Minister: Alfonso La Marmora
- Preceded by: Giuseppe Vacca
- Succeeded by: Giovanni De Falco

Member of the chamber of Deputies
- In office 18 February 1861 – 20 September 1874

Paolo Cortese (Naples, 11 December 1827 – Naples, 21 December 1876) was an Italian politician. Born into a family originally from Basilicata, he was a deputy for the constituencies of Naples and Potenza, and Minister Justice in the second La Marmora government.

== Early life ==
Son of Luca Cortese and Rosa Papa, he began his legal studies from a young age, although he soon allowed himself to be distracted by his political passion. In January 1848, together with his friend it:Filippo Agresti, the young student took part in the insurrection in the province of Potenza, aimed at asking King Ferdinand II of the Two Sicilies to grant a constitution. However, the outbreak of the riots of 1848 did not prevent Cortese from graduating in law in June of the same year and starting a career as a lawyer.

In the following years, after the return to absolutism by the Bourbon sovereign, the young lawyer with patriotic liberal ideas was persecuted by the police, although in 1854 the Council Chamber of Naples did not consider it necessary to proceed criminally against him. In 1860, on the eve of the Expedition of the Thousand he joined the "Committee of the Order", secretly established by Cavour in Naples to prompt a moderate pro-Piedmontese revolt to break out before the arrival of Giuseppe Garibaldi.

== Political career ==
After the unification of Italy, Cortese devoted himself to a political career: in the by-elections of 21 December 1862 he was elected deputy for the constituency of Naples, sitting in the Chamber of Deputies on the benches of the liberal Right. Due to his legal and financial abilities, Cortese was called to numerous parliamentary positions: for example, in 1864 he became rapporteur of a report on the bill presented by Keeper of the Seals Giuseppe Pisanelli concerning the suppression of religious bodies. In June 1865 the Minister of Finance, Quintino Sella, called him to the ministry as general secretary, and two months later, on 10 August, the President of the Council of Ministers Alfonso La Marmora appointed him Minister of Justice in place of the outgoing Giuseppe Vacca.

His work as minister was intense, although the ministry was short-lived, falling on 31 December 1865: during this time Cortese moved his department’s headquarters from Turin to Florence, as a result of the September Convention; signed the code of penal procedure and the regulation of Italian civil status and attempted a reorganization of the national judiciary and judicial districts, to make judicial administration more efficient.

However, his most important project concerned the one on religious bodies, presented together with Minister Sella on 13 December 1865, which provided for their suppression. This bill established that all ecclesiastical property and all goods intended for religious expenses were subject to government control and regulated by civil law. It also standardized and secularized the administration of churches: required government approval for visits by foreign ecclesiastical superiors: established government authority over national metropolitan and diocesan councils; provided that only those "parish priests appointed according to the provisions of the Council of Trent would be recognized: and mandated the creation of representative councils in each cathedral or parish church. The bill was only partially approved on 7 July 1866, after the favorable opinion of a parliamentary commission which included Giovanni Lanza, Giuseppe Pisanelli and Matteo Raeli.

== Later life ==
From then on Cortese no longer held government positions, but continued his political commitment: elected deputy in 1865 for the Potenza constituency, in the spring 1871 elections he ran for Agnone, also becoming commissioner of the Cassa Depositi e Prestiti and a member of the Budget and Justice commissions. He also played an important role in the approval of bills such as the one on parliamentary incompatibility and on the organization of central and provincial administration, as well as voting in favor of the 1873 law for the suppression of Roman religious corporations.

Having retired from political life in 1874 due to a serious illness, Paolo Cortese died in Naples on 21 December 1876, aged just 49.

== Bibliography ==
- Un liberale moderno, Guido Cortese by Amelia Cortese Ardias, Mondadori 1967
