= Desiderato Chiaves =

Italian lawyer, poet, journalist, musician and conservative politician

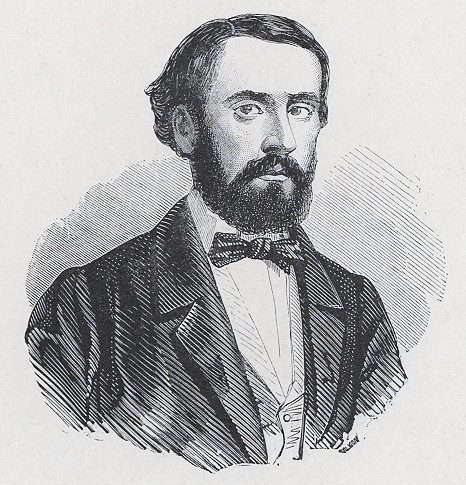

Minister of the Interior
- In office 4 December 1865 – 20 June 1866
- Monarch: Victor Emmanuel II
- Prime Minister: Alfonso La Marmora
- Preceded by: Giuseppe Natoli
- Succeeded by: Bettino Ricasoli

Senator
- In office 24 January 1891 – 29 June 1895

Deputy
- In office 18 February 1861 – 25 September 1882

Vice-President of the Chamber of Deputies
- In office 5 December 1870 – 27 November 1871)

Deputy
- In office 10 June 1886 – 22 October 1890

Deputy (Kingdom of Sardinia)
- In office 19 December 1853 – 17 December 1860

Desiderato Chiaves (Turin, 2 October 1825 – Turin, 29 June 1895) was an Italian lawyer, poet, journalist, musician and conservative politician.

== Early life and career ==
Desiderato Chiaves was the son of Carlo Chiaves, formerly an officer in the Napoleonic army, and his wife Maria Vandiol. He graduated in law in 1846 and took articles with a well-known Turin lawyer it: Giovanni Battista Cornero. He was one of the leaders of the popular movements that welcomed the reforms of King Charles Albert. When freedom of the press was granted he began contributing to began writing satirical poems for Il Fischietto under the pseudonym "Fra' Galdino." His caustic wit irritated Napoleon III, who complained to Cavour about him at the Congress of Paris, after which he was persuaded to desist. During the same period, he tried his hand for the first time at writing plays. He also published, in 1843, Il Giudice di Fatto, a theoretical and practical guide to serving on a jury, and a Giurì in materia di reati di stampa about the work of a jury in cases concerning the press. He was also elected to Turin City Council in 1852, where he served for some thirty years.

== Early career in the Sardinian and Italian parliaments ==
Chiaves was first elected to the Sardinian Chamber of Deputies, taking his seat on March 1, 1857. He took part in the debate on the proposed amendments to the Penal Code, presented by Minister it: Adolfo De Foresta. On April 25, 1859, he was appointed rapporteur of the bill granting the government full powers during the Second Italian War of Independence. After being re-elected he was tasked with leading the debate on the Treaty of Turin (1860), that would cede Savoy and Nice to France: he favoured the cession of Savoy, but had reservations about Nice. During the October 1860 debate on the law annexing the southern provinces, he spoke in support of Cavour's policy. A few months later, however, during the hearing of it:Rodolfo Audinot’s proposal to make Rome the new national capital, Chiaves was the only deputy to raise doubts about the wisdom of the proposal, as Venice was still under Austrian rule.

In the new Italian Chamber of Deputies he was elected continuously until 1882, first from the constituency of Bra and later for Acqui. He was initially a prominent figure in the group of Piedmontese deputies led by Giuseppe La Farina, and after La Farina’s death, Chiaves, who had been in favour of Ricasoli and Rattazzi, opposed the First Minghetti government. In 1864 he spoke in the chamber against a proposal from Pasquale Stanislao Mancini to abolish the death penalty.

== Ministerial and later parliamentary career ==
He served as Minister of the Interior of the Kingdom of Italy in the Second and Third La Marmora governments (4 December 1865 - 17 June 1866). Much of his time in office was occupied with the political and military preparations for the acquisition of Veneto.

After this Chiaves remained aligned with the politics of Quintino Sella with whom he opposed the Third Menabrea government last Menabrea ministry. After Menabrea's fall, he was invited to join the cabinet that Enrico Cialdini was trying to assemble; Chiaves however did not consider the financial policies of the proposed cabinet sufficiently rigorous and he declined, so Cialdini’s effort to form a government came to nothing.

From December 1870 to November 1871, during the first session of the Italian Parliament in Rome, Chiaves was elected vice president of the Chamber. He was a consistent opponent of Agostino Depretis, and when the new electoral list system was introduced in 1882, he decided to abstain from the elections. However, in the elections of 1886 he returned to the Chamber and from 1887, he opposed the establishment of the office of the Prime Minister, fearing the centralisation represented by Francesco Crispi and rejecting the Triple Alliance. On 27 October 1890 he was appointed senator.

== Honours ==
Grand Officer of the Order of Saints Maurice and Lazarus - ribbon for ordinary uniform

Grand Officer of the Order of Saints Maurice and Lazarus
— 20 June 1866

Grand Officer of the Order of the Crown of Italy - ribbon for ordinary uniform

Grand Officer of the Order of the Crown of Italy
