= Vigliani =

Vigliani is a surname. Notable people with the surname include:

- Paolo Onorato Vigliani (1814–1900), Italian magistrate
- René Vigliani (born 1929), French football referee
