= Angioletti =

Angioletti is an Italian surname. Notable people with the surname include:

- Diego Angioletti (1822–1905), Italian general and Minister of the Navy
- Giovanni Battista Angioletti (1896–1961), Italian writer and journalist
- Matteo Angioletti (born 1980), Italian artistic gymnast
