= Jessie White Mario =

English (and naturalized Italian) writer and philanthropist

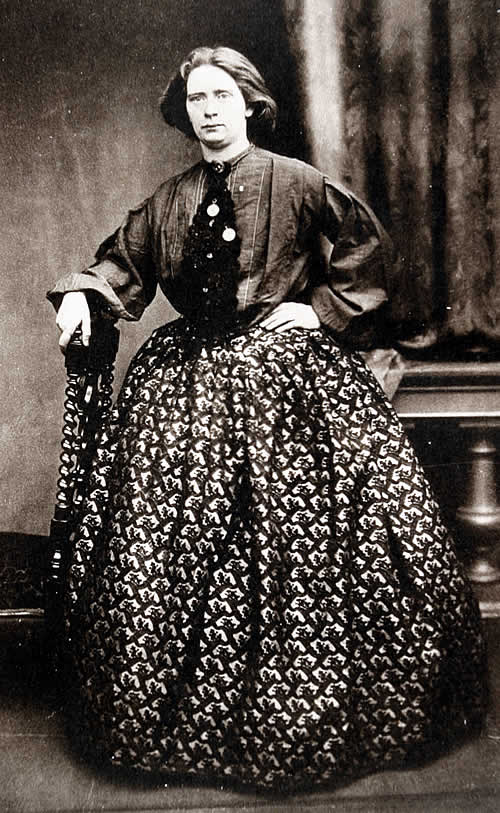
- Jessie White Mario
- Born: 9 May 1832; Gosport, Hampshire, England
- Died: 5 March 1906 (aged 73); Florence, Italy
- Occupations: Journalist; writer; philanthropist
- Known for: Biographer of Giuseppe Garibaldi
- Spouse: Alberto Mario (m. 1857)

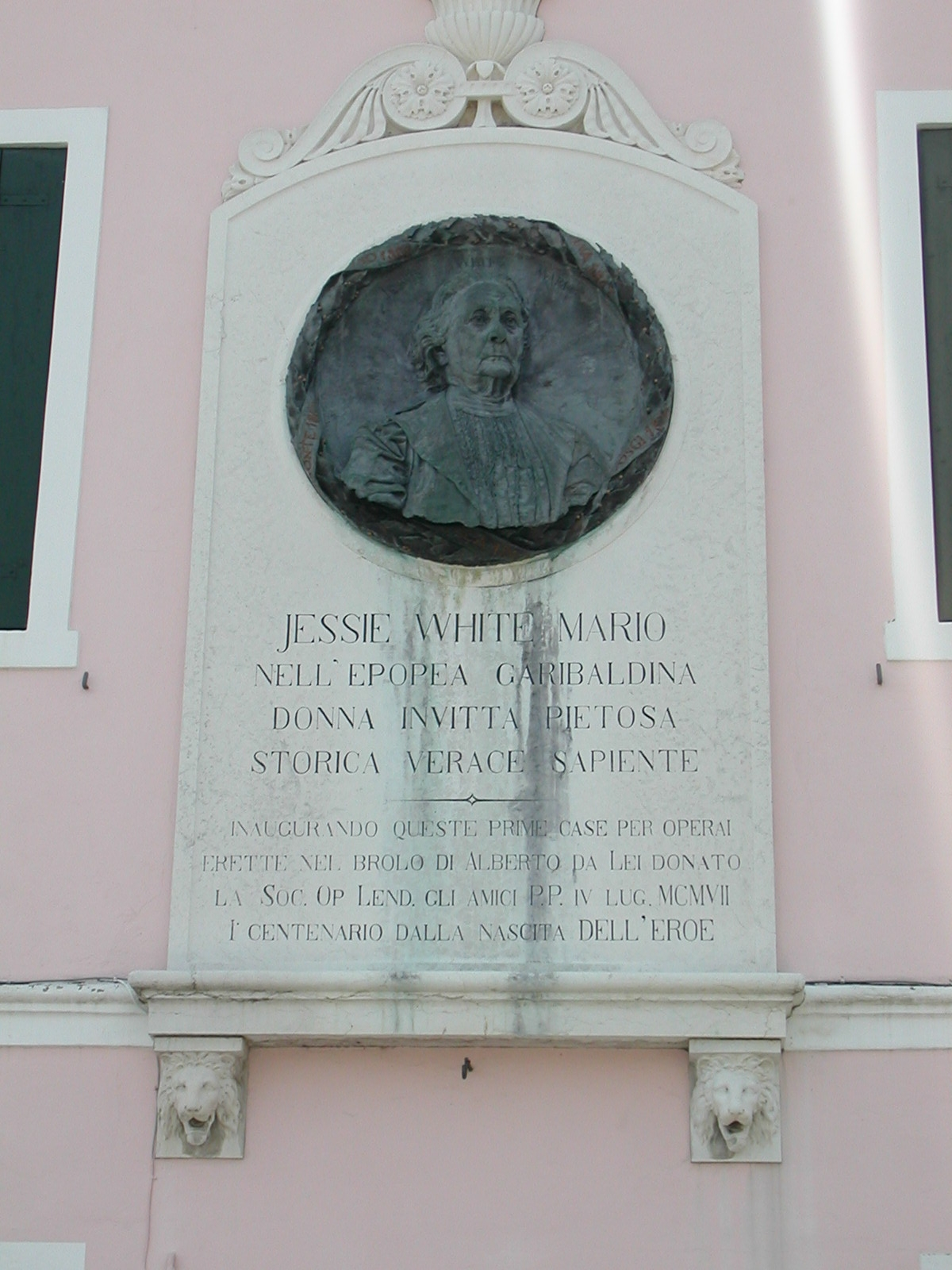
Jessie White remembered in Italy.

Jessie White Mario (9 May 1832 – 5 March 1906) was an English (and naturalized Italian) writer and philanthropist. She is sometimes referred to as "Hurricane Jessie" in the Italian press.

She was a nurse to Giuseppe Garibaldi's soldiers in four wars for the Unification of Italy (Risorgimento); she researched living conditions of the poor in the slums in subterranean Naples and working conditions in Sicily's sulphur mines. She wrote copiously (in English and Italian) as both a journalist and a biographer. For four decades, as a correspondent for the American periodical The Nation from 1866 to 1906, Jessie White provided readers in the U.S. with extensive coverage on the political, social, and cultural changes unfolding in Italy.

Her most famous biography was about Giuseppe Garibaldi.

== Youth and education ==
Born Jessie Jane Meriton White, she was the daughter of Thomas White and Jane Teage Meriton of Gosport, Hampshire, England. Thomas was part of the White family of Cowes, Isle of Wight, boat builders for generations, but he moved to the mainland and switched from building boats to building docks and warehouses. His was a religiously strict, non-conformist, household.

After her mother's premature death in 1834, young Jessie was brought up by Jane Gain, her father's third wife—a schoolteacher and devoted follower of educational reformer Johann Heinrich Pestalozzi. Jessie began her schooling in the village of Portsmouth, continued in Reading, and later moved to London before relocating to Birmingham at the age of seventeen.

Through her childhood educators, John Daniel Morell and George Dawson, she was introduced to liberal and radical thought of John Stuart Mill and Giuseppe Mazzini, and the revolutionary ideas of the Revolutions of 1848. This intellectual foundation eventually led her to pursue philosophy at the Sorbonne in Paris, where she studied between 1852 and 1854 under Victor Cousin, having been recommended to him by Dawson.

In Paris she lived in a pension with her sister Lou, and supported herself by writing articles and stories with French contemporary backgrounds for English magazines, and by teaching. She met the philosopher and supporter of the French Revolution of 1848, Hugues Félicité Robert de Lamennais. Jessie wrote a long appreciation of his life as he had recounted it to her and as she had observed it, which was published in the Biographical Magazine.

Also in Paris during those years was Mrs. Emma Roberts who considered herself engaged to Giuseppe Garibaldi. Jessie and Mrs. Roberts became friends and when Mrs. Roberts went to visit Garibaldi first in Nice and then Sardinia, she took Jessie as her companion.

== Italian unification ==
Jessie, like many in Britain, had heard for some time about the atrocities of the Austrian, French and Bourbon dictatorships in various parts of the Italian peninsula. Garibaldi fired her imagination and she dedicated herself to the Unification of Italy.

Upon her return to London in the spring of 1855, Jessie applied to medical schools with the hope of becoming a doctor – some have said she was the first woman in England to do so. All her applications were rejected because of her gender.

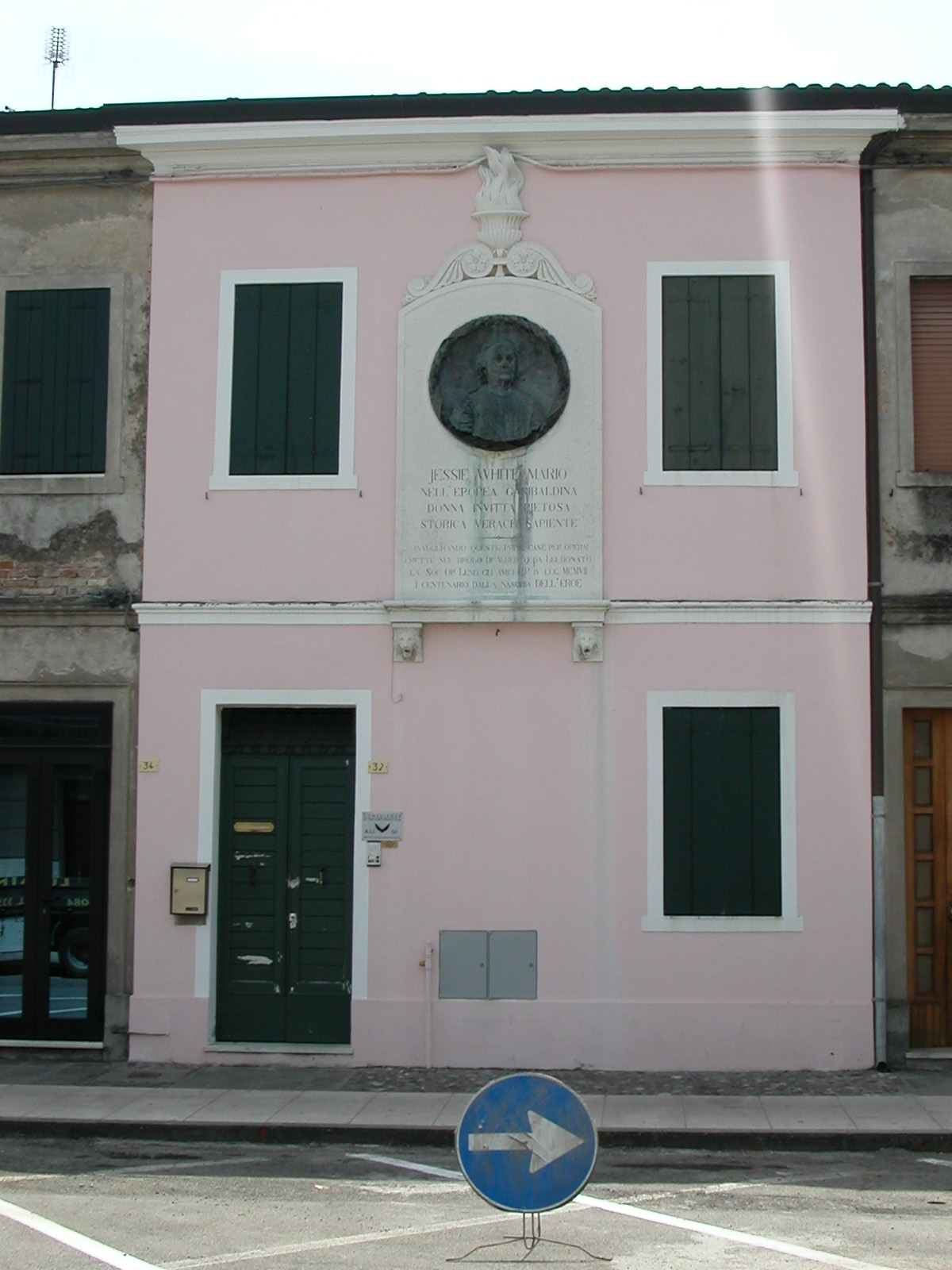
Jessie White's house in Lendinara (Rovigo).

She became a propagandist for the Italian cause working with Giuseppe Mazzini, then in exile in London, who noted approvingly that "she is very absolute in her opinions". She wrote newspaper articles explaining the issues in Italy, gave lectures and raised funds for the Italian cause in northern England and Scotland.

When, in 1857, Mazzini went to Genoa, Jessie followed him. Her arrival was announced in the Italia del Popolo newspaper, which had been publishing accounts of her speaking tours. She was treated as a celebrity, toured the area and successfully deflected attention away from Mazzini, who was working on a clandestine expedition to break patriots out of a Bourbon prison near Naples. The operation failed badly, Mazzini escaped the police round-up and returned to London. Jessie was captured and sent to prison in Genoa for four months, where she met the man who would become her husband, Alberto Mario. They married in December 1857 at her family's home in England.

Jessie continued her speaking tours in England and Scotland, to much acclaim. In the Fall of 1858 Jessie and Alberto went to New York City to continue lecturing and fund-raising; she to English speaking audiences and he to Italian speakers.

Spring 1860 found them in Lugano, Switzerland, from where they rushed to Genoa to be part of the second wave of volunteers going to Sicily to join Garibaldi in his lightning-fast conquest of the Bourbon-controlled southern half of Italy. Alberto was on Garibaldi's staff and Jessie was nurse to the wounded, doing whatever was needed. This included tightly holding a boy while his arm was amputated without anaesthesia. Skills learned and refined during this war were used again in 1866 in the war against the Austrians west of Venice; in 1867 at Monterotondo and Mentana, north of Rome; and in the 1870–71 Franco-Prussian War when Garibaldi led an army against the Germans in eastern France.

As the unification of the Italian peninsula became complete, in 1870, with the addition of Rome which quickly became the capital, attention shifted to the problems of this new country. Social issues were not high on the agenda; in fact, most social problems were not even recognised by the new government.

== Social concerns ==
Starting in the early 1870s Jessie devoted herself to philanthropic work among the urban poor of South Italy, working particularly on three research projects aimed at raising governmental awareness and encouraging subsequent action.

The first was to research the causes, effects and possible solution to the problem of pellagra. This disease, of the three D's — dermatitis, diarrhoea and dementia — is caused by lack of protein-rich foods in the diet and a subsequent lack of vitamin B_{3}. Jessie's research into pellagra lasted for ten years, and her findings showed that even such simple, readily available diet supplements as two glasses of red wine per week reduced the effects of the illness.

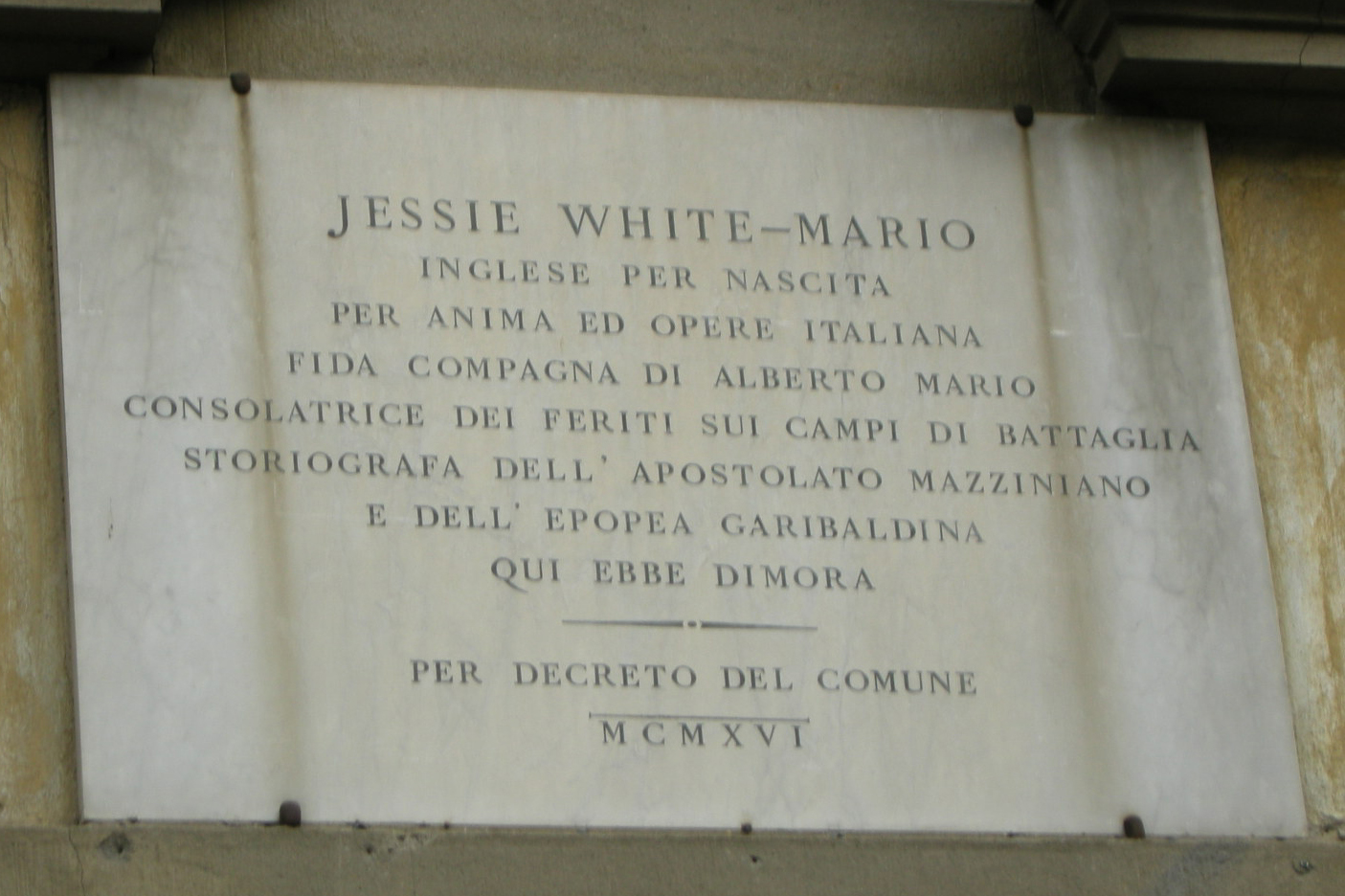
Plaque in Florence

The second was research into the living conditions of the poor in Naples, which was viewed by the government as a very prosperous city. Jessie found large numbers of people living in grottos, under Naples' streets – huge communal spaces with no sanitation, where only crude curtains separated one family's area from the others, all unseen and ignored by Neapolitan citizens in the streets above, except for the grotto landlords who collected exorbitant rents. Her report, La miseria in Napoli ("The Poor of Naples"), was published in 1877, and is cited in timelines of important events in southern Italy. (see The New History of the Italian South, edited by Robert Lumley and Jonathan Morris, 1997)

The third was research into working conditions in the Sicilian sulphur mines. There was a concern about child labour and the general health of the miners: many of whom were physically unfit for military service. Jessie made extensive personal tours and investigations of the mines, both above and below ground, and published her report, Le miniere di Zolfo in Sicilia (The Sulphur Mines in Sicily) in 1894.

== Writings ==
Jessie made her living writing. Jessie's career as a journalist had started in England writing for British newspapers (Litta Visconti Arese in his introduction to The Birth of Modern Italy, says Jessie was the first woman journalist in England.) She also wrote for newspapers in the United States and Italian press. Starting in 1866 the first of what would be 143 articles over 40 years appeared in The Nation published weekly in New York. She was also a frequent contributor to Nuova Antologia a semi-monthly magazine published in Florence. (Rossella Certini [see below] has written that Jessie was the first journalist in Italy to explore the 'cracks' in the Italian reality.)

Writing was also a way of expressing her passion for Italy and its people. She wanted to make sure that some of the lesser known heroes of the Risorgimento were not forgotten. She wrote biographies of Giuseppe Garibaldi and Giuseppe Mazzini, to be sure; but also biographies of Dr. Agostino Bertani, Carlo Cattaneo (with Alberto Mario), Giuseppe Dolfo, Alberto Mario (with Giosuè Carducci), Giovanni Nicotera. She was gathering material for several more at the time of her death.

Jessie also wrote a couple of histories: I Garibaldini in Francia about the Franco-Prussian War; and The Birth of Modern Italy, which was published posthumously.

She died on 5 March 1906 in Florence. A non-religious ceremony was held at her apartment followed by a procession through the streets of Florence. Her ashes are buried in the cemetery at Lendinara, south of Venice, next to Alberto's.

Giosuè Carducci, the 1906 Nobel Laureate for Literature, said: Jessie White Mario 'is a great woman to whom we Italians owe a lot.'

== See also ==
- Sir James Stansfeld
- Giuseppe Garibaldi
- Italian Risorgimento

== Sources ==
- Certini, Rossella (1998). Jessie White Mario una giornalista educatrice: tra liberalismo inglese e democrazia italiana (in Italian). Firenze: Casa Editrice Le Lettere. ISBN 978-8871663609.
- Daniels, Elizabeth A. (1972). Jessie White Mario: Risorgimento revolutionary. Athens, OH: Ohio University Press. ISBN 0-8214-0103-3.
- Holt, Edgar (1971). The Making of Italy, 1815-1870. New York: Atheneum. (Published in Great Britain under the title Risorgimento: The Making of Italy, 1815–1870, London: Macmillan, 1970).
- Pisano, Laura (2012). "Jessie White Mario". Enciclopedia delle donne (in Italian). ISSN 3035-4927.
- Pratt, Edwin A. (1897). Pioneer Women in Victoria's Reign. London: George Newness.
- Sarti, Roland (2004). Italy: A Reference Guide from the Renaissance to the Present. New York: Facts on File. ISBN 0-8160-7474-7.
- Sutcliffe, Marcella Pellegrino (2014). Victorian Radicals and Italian Democrats (PDF). Woodbridge: The Royal Historical Society, published by the Boydell Press. ISBN 978-0-86193-322-8.
- Zazzeri, Angelica (2020). "White Mario, Jessie". Dizionario Biografico degli Italiani (Vol. 100) (in Italian). Treccani.
