= Lendinara =

- Comune
- Comune di Lendinara
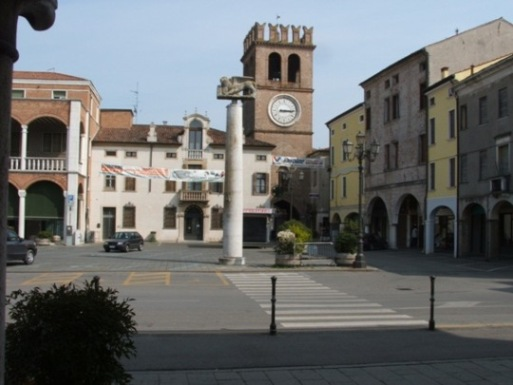
- Risorgimento (“Resurgence”) Square in Lendinara

- Coat of arms

- Location within Italy Location within Veneto
- Coordinates: 45°5′6″N 11°36′2″E
- Country: Italy
- Region: Veneto
- Province: Province of Rovigo (RO)
- Frazioni: Barbuglio, Campomarzo, Valdentro, Molinella, Ramodipalo, Rasa, Sabbioni, Saguedo, Treponti

Government
  - Mayor: Francesca Zeggio

Area
  - Total: 55.06 km^{2} (21.26 sq mi)
- Elevation: 9 m (30 ft)

Population (31 December 2015)
  - Total: 11,873
  - Density: 215.6/km^{2} (558.5/sq mi)
- Demonym: Lendinaresi
- Time zone: UTC+1 (CET)
  - Summer (DST): UTC+2 (CEST)
- Postal code: 45026
- Dialing code: 0425
- Patron saint: Beata Vergine del Pilastrello
- Saint day: September 8
- Website: Official website

Lendinara is a comune in the province of Rovigo, Veneto, northern Italy. It is part of the historical and geographical region of Polesine.

It is the birthplace of Domenico Montagnana (1680–1750), one of the world's finest violin and cello makers. Tenor Domenico Ronconi was also born in the town.

In the latter part of the 19th century, it was the home of Jessie White Mario, the English woman who took an active part in the struggle for the Unification of Italy at the side of Mazzini and Garibaldi. Outside of the town stands the Sanctuary of Nostra Signora del Pilastrello (Our Lady of the Pilaster), at the site of a shrine built in the 16th century to house an icon of the Madonna. The abbey and church were reconstructed in the 19th century.

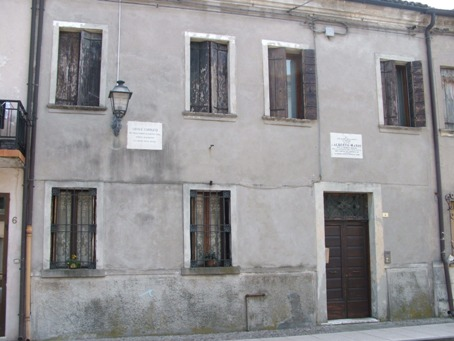
Jessie White's house in Lendinara.

== Geography ==
=== Territory ===
Lendinara is located in the north-east of the Italian peninsula, in the middle western part of Polesine province and it's crossed by the Adigetto river, that divides it in two. Lendinara is 16 km far from the provincial capital Rovigo.

Geographical coordinates:

- sexagesimal system: 45 ° 5 '6,72 "N 11 ° 36' 2,52" E
- decimal system: 45.0852 ° N 11.6007 ° E
- World Wide Locator: JN55TC

Seismic classification: zone 4 (Very low seismic hazard)

=== Climate ===
According to the Köppen climate classification, Lendinara's has a humid subtropical climate (Cfa). This is a temperate climate with hot and sometimes muggy summers and cold, wet winters. Precipitation is concentrated in the spring and autumn seasons.

== History ==
=== Antiquity ===
Numerous archaeological finds such as cinerary urns, tombstones, coins, glass and even traces of road and hydraulic works, show that a primitive center already existed in Roman times. Perhaps there were older settlements since some findings seem to derive their origin from the Middle East.

=== Middle Ages ===
The first historical document about Lendinara dates back to 870, when Uberto Cattaneo, from Verona, obtained from the Carolings the lordship over the town, a lordship that lasted for more than four centuries. Already in the XI century Lendinara was "illustrious Castle, enriched with many factories and towers, cultured population", as the Muratori called it. The castle was located to the left of the Adigetto canal and was surrounded by fortifications that contained a large part of the town. Outside the walls, however, there was the church of Santa Sofia and the convent of San Biagio around which various districts were forming.

Lendinara was located in the middle of a very fertile territory and its rivers, Adige and Adigetto, fostered communications. The development was continuous and rapid with the construction of churches and villas and the presence of notaries, city families, and a developed municipal organization. From 1225 Lendinara had a Podesta and from 1321 it was given the first statute in the Polesine region. The city was destroyed by Ezzelino da Romano in 1246 because of the friendship of its inhabitants (Lendinaresi) with San Bonifacio. After this fire, a new city nucleus arose around the convent of the Franciscans, called 'San Marco'. The convent was suppressed in 1810, like the Abbey of Vangadizza di Badia Polesine. Around 1275, for a short period, the city became a republic. The Paduan bought the city in 1283 and then sold it to the Estensi. In this period the "Granarone”, a large store of provisions, was built. The castle had a five-story tower, and a pit that surrounded the whole town, only a wooden bridge connected the center with the fortress. Four doors regulated access to the city. The fifteenth century was the golden age for culture for Lendinara, after being sold to the Venetians. The great school of the wood artisans Canozio was also born, among which excelled Lorenzo Canozio (1426–1477), author of works of gothic art.

== A.S.D Lendinara Tchoukball ==
A.S.D. Lendinara Tchoukball, founded on September 9, 2009, is a very active sports club in the municipal area in organizing events and in scholastic dissemination. From a competitive point of view, it participates in the Italian Serie A championship with the Lendinara Celtics, and in the Italian Serie B Tchoukball championship with the Lendinara Dragons team. Among its ranks it also presents the Lendinara Wolves, an under 15 youth team, Italian champion of the category in the 2021-2022 season.

== Notable people ==
- Alberto Mario, politician, journalist and supporter of Giuseppe Garibaldi.
- Adolfo Rossi, journalist, writer and diplomat.
- Carlo Zoppellari, footballer.
- Domenico Montagnana, violin maker.
