= Lanza government =

13th Government of Kingdom of Italy

- 13th Cabinet of Italy

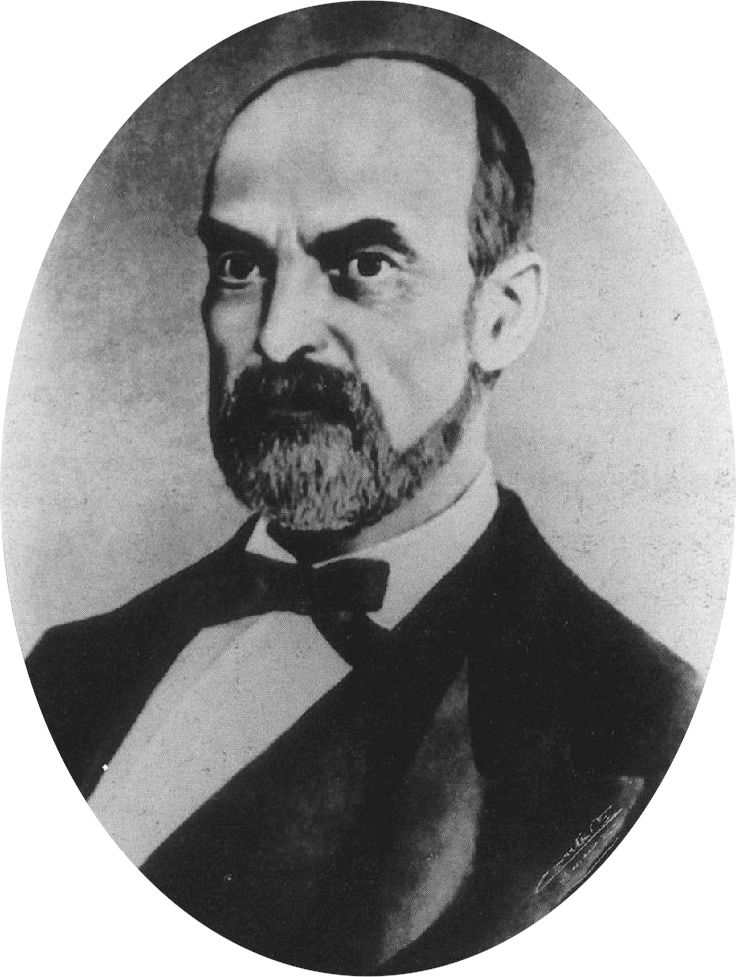
- Date formed: 14 December 1869
- Date dissolved: 10 July 1873

People and organisations
- Head of state: Victor Emmanuel II
- Head of government: Giovanni Lanza
- Total no. of members: 9
- Member party: Historical Right

History
- Predecessor: Menabrea III Cabinet
- Successor: Minghetti II Cabinet

The Lanza government of Italy held office from 14 December 1869 until 10 July 1873, a total of 1,304 days, or 3 years, 6 months and 26 days. It is the second longest government in the history of the Kingdom of Italy, after the Mussolini Cabinet, and the fourth-longest government in Italian history in general after the Mussolini, Berlusconi II and Meloni governments.

== Government parties ==
The government was composed by the following parties:

Party	Ideology	Leader
Historical Right	Conservatism	Giovanni Lanza

== Composition ==
Office	Name	Party	Term
Prime Minister	Giovanni Lanza	Historical Right	(1869–1873)
Minister of the Interior	Giovanni Lanza	Historical Right	(1869–1873)
Minister of Foreign Affairs	Emilio Visconti Venosta	Historical Right	(1869–1873)
Minister of Grace and Justice	Matteo Raeli	Historical Right	(1869–1871)
Minister of Grace and Justice	Giovanni De Falco	Historical Right	(1871–1973)
Minister of Finance	Quintino Sella	Historical Right	(1869–1873)
Minister of War	Giuseppe Govone	Military	(1869–1870)
Minister of War	Cesare Ricotti-Magnani	Military	(1870–1873)
Minister of the Navy	Stefano Castagnola	Historical Right	(1869–1870)
Minister of the Navy	Guglielmo Acton	Military	(1870–1872)
Minister of the Navy	Augusto Riboty	Military	(1872–1873)
Minister of Agriculture, Industry and Commerce	Stefano Castagnola	Historical Right	(1869–1873)
Minister of Public Works	Giuseppe Gadda	Historical Right	(1869–1871)
Minister of Public Works	Giuseppe Devincenzi	Historical Right	(1871–1873)
Minister of Public Education	Cesare Correnti	Historical Right	(1869–1872)
Minister of Public Education	Quintino Sella	Historical Right	(1872–1872)
Minister of Public Education	Antonio Scialoja	Historical Right	(1872–1873)
