= Giuseppe Vacca =

Italian jurist, magistrate and politician (1810 –1876)

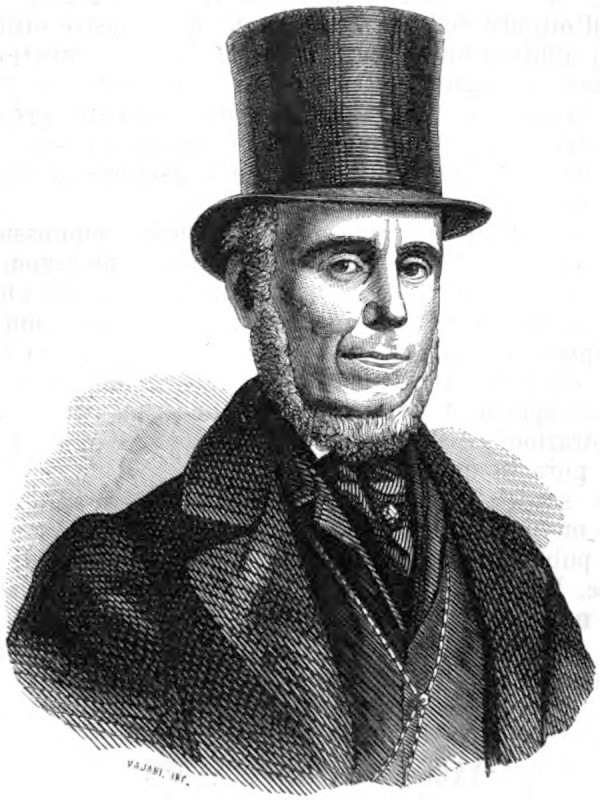

Minister of Justice
- In office 28 September 1864 – 10 August 1865
- Prime Minister: Alfonso La Marmora
- Preceded by: Giuseppe Pisanelli
- Succeeded by: Paolo Cortese

Senator of the Kingdom of Italy
- In office 29 January 1861 – 6 August 1876

Giuseppe Vacca (6 July 1810 (Note: Some sources give his date of birth as 1808.) – 6 August 1876) was an Italian jurist, magistrate and politician.

== Career in the Kingdom of the Two Sicilies ==
Giuseppe Vacca was born in Naples. After graduating in law, in 1848 he became a magistrate and attorney general of the Grand Criminal Court of Naples; he was then appointed Undersecretary of the Interior and subsequently of Justice in the Troya government. He drafted the government's protest note addressed to King Ferdinand II on the parlous conditions of the kingdom. After the fall of the liberal ministry and the king’s abrogation of the Constitution, Vacca was first arrested and then, in 1850, condemned to exile. In 1859 King Francis II pardoned him and invited him to serve as Minister of Justice, but he refused. In 1860 he was general secretary of the southern action committee which advocated Garibaldi's entry into Naples.

== Career in the Kingdom of Italy ==
After the unification of Italy, Vacca was attorney general of the Court of Cassation of Naples, and in 1861 he was appointed senator by Victor Emmanuel II. He also served as Minister of Justice in the second La Marmora government, from 28 September 1864 to 10 August 1865.

His role in the government in 1864 was important, as he presented a bill to Parliament for legislative unification, asking Parliament to delegate its right to discuss the draft civil code directly to the government. A commission was therefore created, chaired by him, which drew up a new civil code and another of civil procedure, both of which came into force on 1 January 1866. The situation was different with the Penal Code, which was developed from the Savoy Penal Code and extended to all of Italy, except Tuscany (due to Tuscan rejection of the death penalty); only in 1889 did Keeper of the Seals Giuseppe Zanardelli succeed in extending a new penal code to the entire kingdom.

== Honours ==
Cavaliere di Gran Croce decorato con Gran Cordone dell'Ordine dei Santi Maurizio e Lazzaro - ribbon for ordinary uniform

Knight of the Grand Cross of the Order of Saints Maurice and Lazarus

Grand'Ufficiale dell'Ordine della Corona d'Italia - ribbon for ordinary uniform

Grand Officer of the Order of the Crown of Italy
