= Pompeo Provana del Sabbione =

Italian admiral and senator

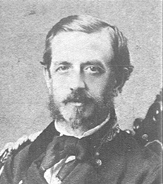

Minister of the Navy
- In office 18 November 1867 – 5 January 1868
- Preceded by: Luigi Federico Menabrea, interim
- Succeeded by: Augusto Riboty

Senator
- In office 17 August 1868 – 2 January 1884

Personal details
- Born: 10 April 1816; Turin
- Died: 1 January 1884 (aged 67); Turin

Count Rufo Pompeo Provana del Sabbione (10 April 1816 – 1 January 1884) was an Italian admiral and senator who briefly served as Minister of the Navy in 1867 and 1868.

== Early life and career ==
Pompeo was the son of Count Casimiro Provana Del Sabbione and his wife Adelaide Romagnano. He was born into an old and distinguished house of the Piedmontese nobility. One of his uncles, Luigi, was also a senator and a member of the Academy of Sciences of Turin; another uncle, Michele, was mayor of Turin, as was his grandfather Francesco.

On 1 September 1828 he enrolled at the Royal Navy School of Genoa from which he graduated and on 13 March 1833 was appointed ensign second class in the general staff corps. He took part in the First Italian War of Independence as a lieutenant second class, and in the Crimean War as frigate captain in command of the paddle corvette Malfatano, towing the it: Azzardoso from Genoa to the Black Sea. In 1859, as commander of the second-rate wheeled pyrofrigate Governolo he transported French troops from Toulon to Genoa to fight in the Second Italian War of Independence.

On 19 June of that same year he joined the naval division in the Adriatic. On 10 July ignoring the armistice agreed two days earlier, he captured four small Austrian merchant units near the Bay of Kotor but had to release them after protests from the Habsburg government. On 16 October 1859 he was promoted to captain second class and given command of the first-rate frigate San Michele, on board which in September 1860 he took part in the siege of Ancona, earning the officer's cross of the Military Order of Savoy.

Provana del Sabbione’s next command was modern first-rate propeller-driven pyrofrigate Vittorio Emanuele and distinguished himself during the siege of Gaeta, earning the silver medal for military valor, and the siege of Messina.

On 1 April 1861 he was promoted to rear admiral and in 1863 he was given command of the first-rate propeller frigate Maria Adelaide. He made a tour of the western Mediterranean, sailed to Portugal and took part in the first naval review in Naples after the proclamation of the Kingdom of Italy. After the defeat at the Battle of Lissa, he was invited to assume command of the fleet but refused.

== Ministerial career ==
In December 1867 Provana Del Sabbione agreed instead to serve as Minister of the Navy in the first Menabrea government. Menabrea had held the portfolio himself on an interim basis after the resignation of Federico Pescetto amid accusations of collusion with other Freemasons and with opponents of the disgraced admiral Carlo Pellion di Persano.

His brief tenure was marked by three main initiatives. He supported the early phase of Italian colonialism, sending captain Luigi Bertelli to explore the coasts of the Red Sea. He also drafted a bill to create a single institute in Livorno for training Navy officers in the old quarantine hospital, but was opposed by the Ministry of the Interior which wanted to preserve its public health use. Last, he withdrew the bill laid before the chamber by his predecessor Pescetto concerning the reorganization of the Marine infantry.

The cabinet in which Provana Del Sabbione served was short-lived, losing a vote of confidence in the chamber. Menabrea was obliged to form a new cabinet that was more politically balanced and less reliant on courtiers, senators and senior officials from outside the chamber. Provana Del Sabbione resigned with his colleagues and was replaced in the new cabinet by Augusto Riboty.

== Later career ==
After resigning as Minister of the Navy, Provana Del Sabbione returned to active service as vice admiral and resuming command of the second Maritime Department. Four days later he was appointed to the Senate. On 25 February 1869 he became a member of the commission for the examination of the maritime penal code. He retired when he reached the age limit for active service on 1 December 1870.

He died in Turin on 2 January 1884.

== Honours ==
Grand'Ufficiale dell'Ordine della Corona d'Italia - ribbon for ordinary uniform

Grand Officer of the Order of the Crown of Italy

Commendatore dell'Ordine dei Santi Maurizio e Lazzaro - ribbon for ordinary uniform

Commander of the Order of Saints Maurice and Lazarus

Medaglia d'argento al valor militare - ribbon for ordinary uniform

Silver Medal of Military Valor

Commendatore dell'Ordine del Leone dei Paesi Bassi (Paesi Bassi) - ribbon for ordinary uniform

Commander of the Order of the Netherlands Lion

Medaglia inglese della Guerra di Crimea - ribbon for ordinary uniform

British Crimea Medal
