= Michele Pironti =

Italian politician

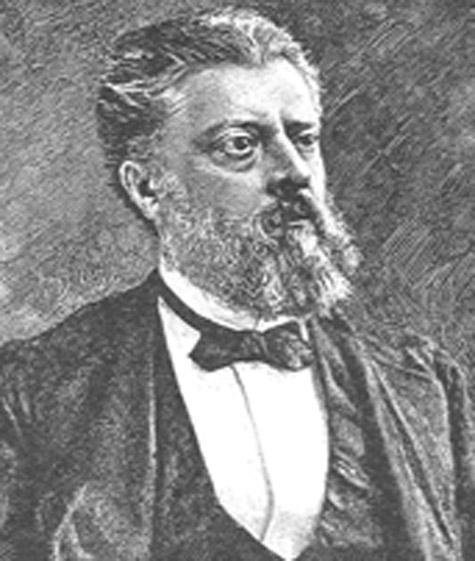

Minister of Justice
- In office 26 May 1869 – 22 October 1869
- Preceded by: Gennaro De Filippo
- Succeeded by: Paolo Onorato Vigliani

Senator
- In office 28 February 1869 – 14 October 1885

Member of the Chamber of Deputies
- In office 29 December 1861 – 9 September 1865

Count Michele Pironti (14 January 1814 – 14 October 1885) was an Italian politician and patriot, senator and Minister of Justice of the Kingdom of Italy.

== Early life and activism ==
He was born in Montoro, Campania, the son of Francesco Antonio Pironti and Rosa Belli and the second of thirteen children. His maternal uncle Alfonso Belli had been active in the Carbonari uprising and had been condemned to exile as a result. Pironti began his education in the parish school before attending high school in Nola, eventually graduating in law from the University of Naples.

After beginning his career in law, in 1844 he joined the Lucanian-Salerno Masonic lodge, where he met Luigi Settembrini. He was one of the signatories of a subscription to offer a sword of honor to Giuseppe Garibaldi, and took part in political discussions at the Caffè del Campo, but soon his own home became a place of meeting and political debate. The granting of a constitution and freedom of the press in 1848 opened the door to political activity for him for the first time.

In the elections of 27 April 1848 he was elected as a deputy in the Citerior Principality of Citra with 3904 votes, while on 8 May he was appointed judge of the Grand Criminal Court of Santa Maria Capua Vetere. In addition he began to publish, from 20 February a bi-weekly political newspaper La Guida del Popolo. He was active in the uprising against Bourbon rule which meant that he lost his job.

== Arrest and imprisonment ==
On 3 August 1849 Pironti was arrested and tried for having founded the underground patriotic organization “Grande Società dell'Unità Italiana” with Luigi Settembrini, it:Filippi Agresti and others. On 1 February 2851 he was sentenced to death but his sentence was commuted to 24 years imprisonment and he was confined in Nisida and Montefusco prisons, together with Luigi Settembrini and Carlo Poerio.

The British ambassador made representations on his behalf to the Neapolitan authorities The conditions of his confinement were so harsh that he eventually became paralyzed and lost the use of his legs. According to some sources, he eventually escaped with Settembrini and other political prisoners when they managed to divert a ship taking them into exile from its course to New York and landed in Cork, Ireland. According to other sources however, his severely weakened health meant that he was not deported along with Settembrini.

== Political career ==
After the unification of Italy, on 17 September 1860 he was appointed councilor of the Supreme Court of Naples and in January 1861 he was elected deputy from the constituency of Nocera Inferiore. He declined to take his seat however, due to his appointment from 25 July to 27 October as general secretary of Justice under the Royal Lieutenant in Naples, Enrico Cialdini. In this role he was noted for anti-clerical activity and for purging magistrates who were felt to be too close to the old Bourbon regime. In the run-off elections of 29 December 1861 he was re-elected to the Chamber of Deputies where he sat during the VIII Legislature.

He was appointed as a senator of the Kingdom of Italy on 28 February 2869. He was subsequently appointed Minister of Justice in the third Menabrea government (26 May-22 October 1869).

== Later life ==
After Pironti’s resignation as minister, Victor Emmanuel II ennobled him, making him a count. On 9 August 1873 he was elected first as provincial councilor in Montoro and then as president of the provincial administration of Avellino. In that period in Naples he was also president of the section of the Court of Cassation (21 October 1873) and first president of the court of appeal (1 April 1875). After the 1876 general election Italy’s new left wing government under Agostino Depretis appointed Pironti to Ancona as the first president of the court of appeal, but he never took up this post after supporters applied pressure for him to be given a more desirable position. Eventually in 1879 he was named attorney general of the court of appeals in Florence.

In 1881 he returned to Naples as attorney general at the court of appeals. His final appearance in politics was when he stood unsuccessfully in the 1883 local elections. He died in Torre del Greco on 14 October 1885. He was married to Giuseppina Mascilli; with whom he had a daughter, Carolina.

== Honours ==
Cavaliere di Gran Croce decorato di Gran Cordone dell'Ordine della Corona d'Italia – ribbon for ordinary uniform

Grand cordon of the Order of the Crown of Italy

Grand'Ufficiale dell'Ordine dei Santi Maurizio e Lazzaro – ribbon for ordinary uniform

Grand officer of the Order of Saints Maurice and Lazarus
