= Gennaro De Filippo =

Italian politician

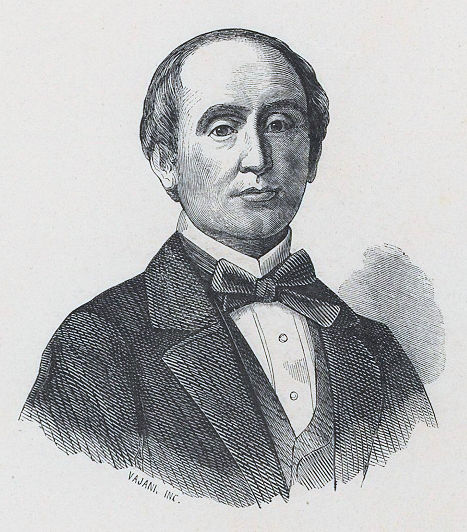

Minister of Justice
- In office 5 January 1868 – 9 November 1872
- Preceded by: Adriano Mari
- Succeeded by: Michele Pironti

Senator
- In office 9 November 1872 – 29 June 1887

Member of the Chamber of Deputies
- In office 18 February 1861 – 20 September 1874

Gennaro De Filippo (Naples, 9 February 1816 – Rome, 29 June 1887) was an Italian politician.

== Biography ==
He was elected to the Chamber of Deputies in the VIII legislature (1861–1865) and was re-elected to the IX, X, and XI legislatures. He was Minister of Justice of the Kingdom of Italy in the second and third Menabrea governments (5 January 1868 – 7 May 1869 and 13–26 May 1869) and was appointed a Senator in 1872.

== Honours ==
=== Italian honors ===
Grand Officer of the Order of Saints Maurice and Lazarus - ribbon for ordinary uniform

Grand Officer of the Order of Saints Maurice and Lazarus

Grand Cordon of the Order of the Crown of Italy - ribbon for ordinary uniform

Grand Cordon of the Order of the Crown of Italy

=== Foreign honors ===
Grand Cordon of the Order of Saint Michael (Bavaria) - ribbon for ordinary uniform

Grand Cordon of the Order of Saint Michael (Bavaria)
