= Second Minghetti government =

14th Government of Kingdom of Italy

Minghetti II government
- 14th Cabinet of Italy

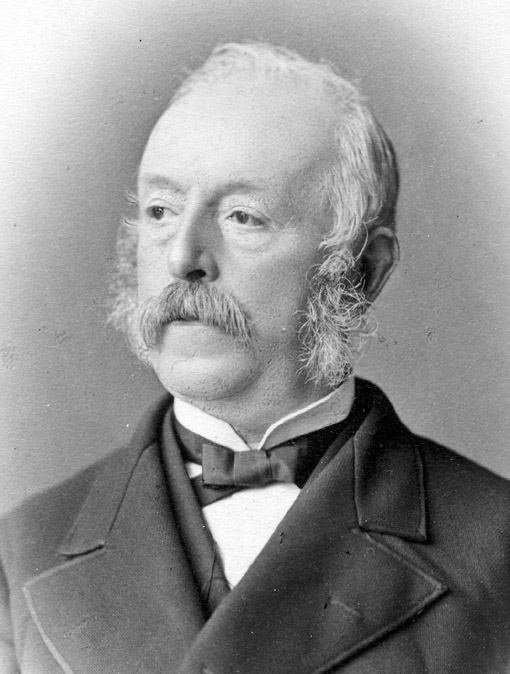
- Date formed: 10 July 1873
- Date dissolved: 25 March 1876

People and organisations
- Head of state: Victor Emmanuel II
- Head of government: Marco Minghetti
- Total no. of members: 9
- Member party: Historical Right

History
- Predecessor: Lanza Cabinet
- Successor: Depretis I Cabinet

The Minghetti II government of Italy held office from 10 July 1873 until 25 March 1876, a total of 989 days, or 2 year, 8 months and 15 days.

== Government parties ==
The government was composed by the following parties:

Party	Ideology	Leader
Historical Right	Conservatism	Marco Minghetti

== Composition ==
Office	Name	Party	Term
Prime Minister	Marco Minghetti	Historical Right	(1873–1876)
Minister of the Interior	Gerolamo Cantelli	Historical Right	(1873–1876)
Minister of Foreign Affairs	Emilio Visconti Venosta	Historical Right	(1873–1876)
Minister of Grace and Justice	Paolo Onorato Vigliani	Historical Right	(1873–1876)
Minister of Finance	Marco Minghetti	Historical Right	(1873–1876)
Minister of War	Cesare Ricotti-Magnani	Military	(1873–1876)
Minister of the Navy	Simone Antonio Saint-Bon	Military	(1873–1876)
Minister of Agriculture, Industry and Commerce	Gaspare Finali	Historical Right	(1873–1876)
Minister of Public Works	Silvio Spaventa	Historical Right	(1873–1876)
Minister of Public Education	Antonio Scialoja	Historical Right	(1873–1874)
Minister of Public Education	Gerolamo Cantelli	Historical Right	(1874–1874)
Minister of Public Education	Ruggero Bonghi	Historical Right	(1874–1876)
