= Giovanni De Falco =

Italian politician, magistrate and senator

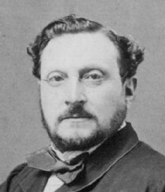

Minister of Justice
- In office 31 December 1865 – 20 June 1866
- Monarch: Victor Emmanuel II
- Prime Minister: Alfonso La Marmora
- Preceded by: Paolo Cortese
- Succeeded by: Francesco Borgatti
- In office 24 February 1871 – 10 July 1873
- Prime Minister: Giovanni Lanza
- Preceded by: Matteo Raeli
- Succeeded by: Paolo Onorato Vigliani

Senator of the Kingdom of Italy
- In office 8 October 1865 – 25 February 1886

Giovanni Raffaele Francesco De Falco (28 May 1818 – 25 February 1886) was an Italian politician, magistrate and senator of the Kingdom of Italy.

== Early life and legal career ==
De Falco was born in Bracigliano. His father Nicola was the lord of Bracigliano, while his mother Agnese belonged to a wealthy local family, the Amatos. After graduating in law from the University of Naples, De Falco became Attorney General at the Grand Criminal Court of Naples (27 July 1860); Counselor of the Supreme Court of Justice of Naples, then of the Court of Cassation of Naples (28 January 1861); Deputy Attorney General at the Supreme Court of Justice of Naples, then at the Court of Cassation of Naples (6 April 1862) and eventually Attorney General at the Court of Cassation of Naples (27 December 1863). After the unification of Italy he was appointed Attorney General at the Court of Cassation of Rome (13 January 1876 -25 February 1886) and later served as a member of the Diplomatic Litigation Council (1885).

== Political career ==
De Falco was appointed senator on 8 October 1865. He then served as Minister of Justice twice, in the second La Marmora government (31 December 1865 - 20 June 1866) and the Lanza government (24 February 1871 - 5 July 1873).

As Justice Minister, De Falco led two initiatives to furnish the new Kingdom of Italy with a single criminal code. In 1866 he brought forward a draft code he had been working on since 1864, but parliament failed to pass it. He tried again in 1873 during his second term but left office before it could be presented to parliament.

De Falco died in Naples on 25 February 1886, at the age of 67.

== Honours ==
=== Italian honours ===
Grand Cordon of the Order of the Crown of Italy (5 July 1873) - ribbon for ordinary uniform

Grand Cordon of the Order of the Crown of Italy (5 July 1873)

Grand officer of the Order of Saints Maurice and Lazarus (20 June 1866) - ribbon for ordinary uniform

Grand officer of the Order of Saints Maurice and Lazarus (20 June 1866)

=== Foreign honours ===
Grand Cross of the Order of the Rose (Brazil)(20 August 1873) - ribbon for ordinary uniform

Grand Cross of the Order of the Rose (Brazil)(20 August 1873)
