= Carlo Zoppellari =

Italian footballer (1921-2011)

Personal information
- Date of birth: July 13, 1921
- Place of birth: Lendinara, Italy
- Date of death: March 21, 2011
- Position: Midfielder

Senior career*
| Years | Team | Apps | (Gls) |
| 1939–1940 | Rovigo | 0 | (0) |
| 1940–1941 | Ambrosiana-Inter | 6 | (1) |
| 1941–1942 | Rovigo | 29 | (10) |
| 1942–1943 | Vicenza | 15 | (0) |
| 1945–1946 | Rovigo | 0 | (0) |
| 1946–1947 | Modena | 5 | (0) |
| 1947–1949 | Fiorentina | 35 | (2) |
| 1949–1950 | Bari | 12 | (1) |
- * Club domestic league appearances and goals

Carlo Zoppellari (July 13, 1921, in Lendinara – 2011) was an Italian professional football player.
