= Third Menabrea government =

12th Government of Kingdom of Italy

Menabrea III government
- 12th Cabinet of Italy

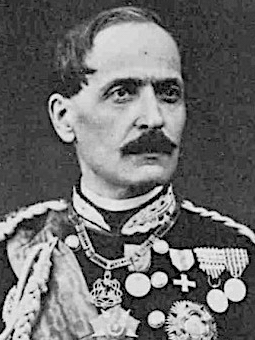
- Date formed: 13 May 1869
- Date dissolved: 14 December 1869

People and organisations
- Head of state: Victor Emmanuel II
- Head of government: Luigi Federico Menabrea
- Total no. of members: 9
- Member party: Historical Right

History
- Predecessor: Menabrea II Cabinet
- Successor: Lanza Cabinet

The Menabrea III government of Italy held office from 13 May 1869 until 14 December 1869, a total of 215 days, or 7 months and 1 days.

== Government parties ==
The government was composed by the following parties:

| Party | Ideology | Leader |
|---|---|---|
| Historical Right | Conservatism | Luigi Federico Menabrea |

== Composition ==
| Office | Name | Party | Term |
|---|---|---|---|
| Prime Minister | Luigi Federico Menabrea | Historical Right | (1869–1869) |
| Minister of the Interior | Luigi Ferraris | Historical Right | (1869–1869) |
| Minister of the Interior | Antonio Starabba di Rudinì | Historical Right | (1869–1869) |
| Minister of Foreign Affairs | Luigi Federico Menabrea | Historical Right | (1869–1869) |
| Minister of Grace and Justice | Gennaro De Filippo | Historical Right | (1869–1869) |
| Minister of Grace and Justice | Michele Pironti | Historical Right | (1869–1869) |
| Minister of Grace and Justice | Paolo Onorato Vigliani | Historical Right | (1869–1869) |
| Minister of Finance | Luigi Guglielmo Cambray-Digny | Historical Right | (1869–1869) |
| Minister of War | Ettore Bertolè-Viale | Military | (1869–1869) |
| Minister of the Navy | Augusto Riboty | Military | (1869–1869) |
| Minister of Agriculture, Industry and Commerce | Marco Minghetti | Historical Right | (1869–1869) |
| Minister of Public Works | Antonio Mordini | Historical Right | (1869–1869) |
| Minister of Public Education | Angelo Bargoni | Historical Right | (1869–1869) |
