= Second La Marmora government =

6th Government of Kingdom of Italy

La Marmora II government
- 6th Cabinet of Italy

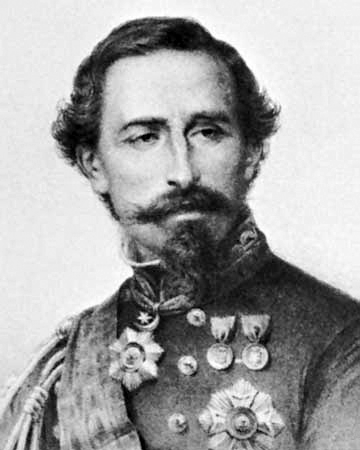
- Date formed: 28 September 1864
- Date dissolved: 31 December 1865

People and organisations
- Head of state: Victor Emmanuel II
- Head of government: Alfonso Ferrero La Marmora
- Total no. of members: 9
- Member party: Historical Right

History
- Predecessor: Minghetti I Cabinet
- Successor: La Marmora III Cabinet

The La Marmora II government of Italy held office from 28 September 1864 until 31 December 1865, a total of 459 days, or 1 year, 3 months and 3 days. It was defeated in a no-confidence motion on 19 December but Marmora reformed his government as the Third La Marmora government.

== Government parties ==
The government was composed by the following parties:

Party	Ideology	Leader
Historical Right	Conservatism	Marco Minghetti

== Composition ==
Office	Name	Party	Term
Prime Minister	Alfonso Ferrero La Marmora	Military	(1864–1865)
Minister of the Interior	Giovanni Lanza	Historical Right	(1864–1865)
Minister of the Interior	Giuseppe Natoli	Historical Right	(1865–1865)
Minister of the Interior	Desiderato Chiaves	Historical Right	(1865–1865)
Minister of Foreign Affairs	Alfonso Ferrero La Marmora	Military	(1864–1865)
Minister of Grace and Justice	Giuseppe Vacca	Independent	(1864–1865)
Minister of Grace and Justice	Paolo Cortese	Historical Right	(1865–1865)
Minister of Finance	Quintino Sella	Historical Right	(1864–1865)
Minister of War	Agostino Petitti Bagliani di Roreto	Military	(1864–1865)
Minister of the Navy	Alfonso Ferrero La Marmora	Historical Right	(1864–1864)
Minister of the Navy	Diego Angioletti	Military	(1864–1865)
Minister of Agriculture, Industry and Commerce	Luigi Torelli	Historical Right	(1864–1865)
Minister of Public Works	Stefano Jacini	Historical Right	(1864–1865)
Minister of Public Education	Giuseppe Natoli	Historical Right	(1865–1865)
