= Matteo Raeli =

Italian jurist (1812–1875)

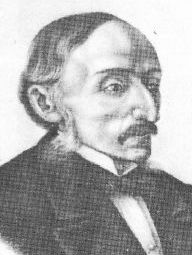

Minister of Justice
- In office 13 May 1869 – 24 February 1871
- Preceded by: Paolo Onorato Vigliani
- Succeeded by: Giovanni De Falco

Member of the Chamber of Deputies
- In office 3 February 1862 – ? September 1862
- In office ? December 1865 – ?

Matteo Raeli (Noto, 23 December 1812 – Noto, 26 November 1875) was an Italian patriot, jurist and politician. As Minister of Justice of the Kingdom of Italy he was responsible for the Law of Guarantees.

== Early life ==
Matteo Raeli was born in Noto to a wealthy family; his father Paolo was a member of the Decuria of Noto. He graduated from the University of Catania, where he graduated in Law, and embarked on a legal career. In 1839 he also became, like his father, Decurione in Noto. His years in the Decurionate were those in which he began to develop liberal and anti-Bourbon ideas.

== The uprisings of 1848-49 ==
Raeli led the liberals of Neto in the Sicilian revolution of 1848 which soon led to the temporary expulsion of the Bourbons. The revolutionary committee called elections for deputies to the House of Commons of the revolutionary Parliament in Palermo in March 1848. In Noto, Raeli he was elected together with the marquis Giuseppe Trigona. The revolutionary Parliament acclaimed Ruggero Settimo as president and the new State of Sicily was established, in which Raeli assumed the position first of Minister of Finance, and then of the Interior and Security. His appointments were short-lived however as General Carlo Filangieri entered Palermo on 15 May, the young Sicilian State ceased to exist and king Ferdinand II was restored. The Bourbon restoration made itself felt in the form of death sentences and exiles for those who had led the rebellion.

== Exile ==
The eventual amnesty extended by the king to the rebels did not include Raeli because he had been a leader of the revolt, Raeli went into exile in Malta with Ruggero Settimo, sharing his fate until the latter's death. In Malta he was commissioned by the British government to draw up a code of colonial law but in the meantime he established relationships with refugees from Sicily and the rest of Italy. There he became friends with Nicola Fabrizi and together with him Raeli dealt with all the political and organizational aspects of the Italian patriotic movement in exile, maintaining contacts with the local secret committees of south-eastern Sicily. It may be during his time in Malta, or possibly earlier, that he became a Freemason.

== With Garibaldi in Sicily ==
Raeli returned to Noto on 13 July 1860 after Garibaldi had successfully led the Expedition of the Thousand in driving King Francis II from most of Sicily. After Garibaldi retired to Caprera a Council of State was formed in Sicily, with Raeli one of its members. Shortly afterwards a referendum confirmed the popular desire to join the new Kingdom of Italy. In December 1860 he was part of the Council of Lieutenancy, in charge of the dicastery of grace and justice.

The first elections for the Chamber of Deputies of the Kingdom of Italy were called on 3 February 1861 and Raeli was elected in the single-member constituency of Noto for the eighth legislature, taking his seat with the historical Right. In September 1862 he resigned his seat after being appointed Attorney General at the Court of Appeal of Trani, and then general secretary of the Ministry of the Interior.

== Deputy and minister ==
In the following legislature he was elected to the Parliament, which had now moved from Turin to Florence, briefly the capital of the country. During the 9th legislature he presented the bill for the suppression of religious corporations. Once it was approved in 1866 the religious communities were abolished and their assets confiscated.

In March 1867 the first session of the X legislature opened. Raeli was elected to represent Caltagirone and was appointed Minister of Justice in the Lanza government and was a strong supporter of moving the nation’s capital from Florence to Rome, signing the order for the military occupation of the city.

In November 1870 he was re-elected to Parliament for the XI legislature, again representing Noto. His main contribution during this session was to draft the Law of Guarantees which put an end to the temporal power of the Popes and to which Pope Pius IX responded with the encyclical it:Ubi Nos. The law he drafted and the papacy’s response to it led to a deep rift between State and Church. Raeli was also elected to the 12th legislature but his health had recently worsened, forcing him to resign. He retired to Noto where he died on 25 November 1875.

The city of Noto dedicated a monument to him, the work of the sculptor Francesco Saverio Sortino.

== Honours ==
Cavaliere di Gran Croce dell'Ordine dei Santi Maurizio e Lazzaro – ribbon for ordinary uniform

Knight of the Grand Cross awarded the Grand Cordon of the Order of Saints Maurice and Lazarus

Knight Grand Cross of the Order of Charles III (Spain)
