= Gaspare Finali =

Italian jurist and politician (1829–1914)

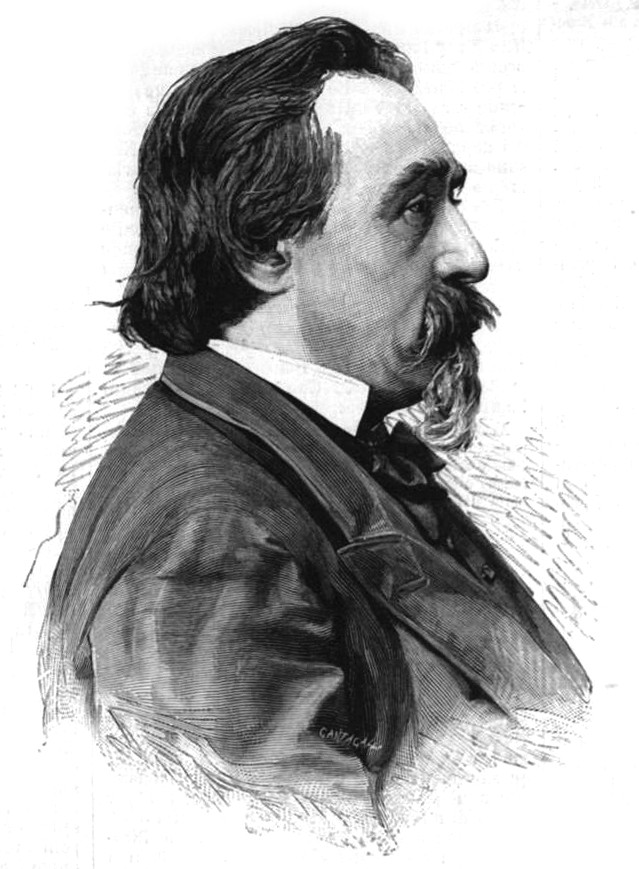

Personal details
- Born: 20 May 1829 Cesena, Papal States
- Died: 11 August 1914 (aged 85) Marradi, Kingdom of Italy
- Occupation: Academic; Jurist

Gaspare Finali (1829–1914) was an Italian academic and politician who held various cabinet posts, including minister of agriculture and commerce. He was also a member of the Parliament.

== Early life and education ==
Finali was born in Cesena on 20 May 1829. He graduated from the University of Bologna obtaining a degree in law.

== Career ==
He joined the republican movement in Rome in 1849. He went into exile in Romagna and then in Piedmont from 1855. He served as a deputy in the period between 1865 and 1870 and as a general secretary at the Ministry of Finance from 1868 to 1869. He was elected a senator in 1872 and was the vice president of the Senate between 1898 and 1904 with some interruptions. He was appointed minister of agriculture and commerce in the cabinet led by Marco Minghetti between 1873 and 1876. Next he was named the minister of public works in the cabinet of Francesco Crispi and held the post from 1887 to 1891. He was also minister of treasury in the cabinet of Giuseppe Saracco in 1901.

Finali was promoted to professorship in the field of state accounting in 1880. He was the president of the Court of Auditors from 1893 to 1907. During this period he was a senator and attempted to form a cabinet in 1898. He was also a member of the Lincean Academy.

== Personal life and death ==
Finali married twice and had a son. He died in Marradi on 11 August 1914.

=== Awards ===
Finali was the recipient of the following:

- Knight of the Order of Saints Maurice and Lazarus (1860)
- Knight of the Civil Order of Savoy (24 February 1898)
- Commander of the Order of the Crown of Italy
- Commander of the Order of Christ Cross (Portugal)
- Knight of the Supreme Order of Saints Annunziata (1904)
- Grand Cordon of the Order of Franz Joseph (Austro-Hungarian Empire)
- Grand Cordon of the Order of the Crown (Prussia)
- Grand Cordon of the Order of the Sun and Lion (Persia)
- Grand Officer of the Order of Charles III (Spain)
