= Alberto Mario =

Italian politician

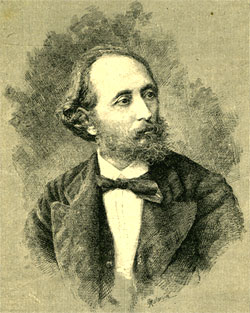

Alberto Mario (Lendinara, 4 June 1825 – 2 June 1883) was an Italian politician, journalist and supporter of Giuseppe Garibaldi. His wife was Jessie White, an English supporter of Garibaldi.
