= Giovanni Nicotera =

Italian politician (1828–1894)

Italian Minister of Interior
- In office 6 February 1891 – 15 May 1892
- Monarchs: Victor Emmanuel II; Umberto I
- Prime Minister: Antonio di Rudinì
- Preceded by: Francesco Crispi
- Succeeded by: Giovanni Giolitti
- In office 25 March 1876 – 26 December 1877
- Monarchs: Victor Emmanuel II; Umberto I
- Prime Minister: Agostino Depretis
- Preceded by: Girolamo Cantelli
- Succeeded by: Francesco Crispi

Member of the Italian Chamber
- In office 22 November 1882 – 22 October 1890
- Constituency: Naples
- In office 5 December 1870 – 3 October 1876
- Constituency: Naples

Personal details
- Born: 9 September 1828 Sambiase, Lamezia Terme, Two Sicilies
- Died: 13 June 1894 (aged 65) Vico Equense, Italy
- Party: Action Party (1848–53); Historical Left (1870–80; 1887–92); Dissident Left (1880–87)
- Profession: Soldier

Military service
- Branch/service: Royal Italian Army
- Years of service: 1848–1866
- Rank: Commandant
- Unit: 6th Volunteer Regiment
- Battles/wars: Italian Unification (1815–1871): Expedition of the Thousand (1860); Battle of Aspromonte (1862); Battle of Mentana (1867)

Giovanni Nicotera (9 September 1828 – 13 June 1894) was an Italian patriot and politician. His surname is pronounced as [niˈkɔːtera], with stress on the second syllable.

== Biography ==
Nicotera was born at Sambiase, in Calabria, in the Kingdom of the Two Sicilies.

Joining the Giuseppe Mazzini's movement of Giovine Italia ("Young Italy") he was among the combatants at Naples in May 1848, and battle with Garibaldi during the Republic of Rome (1849). After the fall of Rome, he fled to Piedmont. In 1857, he took part in the expedition to Sapri led by Pisacane, but shortly after their landing they were defeated; he was severely wounded by the Bourbon troops.

Condemned to death, but reprieved through the intervention of the British minister, he remained a prisoner at Naples and at Favignana until 1860, when he joined Garibaldi at Palermo. Sent by Garibaldi to Tuscany, he attempted to invade the Papal States with a volunteer brigade, but his followers were disarmed and disbanded by Ricasoli and Cavour. In 1862 he was with Garibaldi at Aspromonte; in 1866 he commanded a volunteer brigade against Austria; in 1867 he invaded the Papal States from the south, but the defeat of Garibaldi at Mentana put an end to his enterprise.

His parliamentary career dates from 1860. During the first ten years, he engaged in violent opposition, but from 1870 onwards he joined in supporting the military reforms of Ricotti. Upon the advent of the Left in 1876, Nicotera became minister of the interior and governed with remarkable firmness. He was obliged to resign in December 1877, when he joined Crispi, Cairoli, Zanardelli and Baccarini in forming the "pentarchy" in opposition to Depretis. He only returned to power thirteen years later as minister of the interior in the Rudinì cabinet of 1891. On this occasion, he restored the system of uninominal constituencies, resisted socialist agitation, and pressed, though in vain, for the adoption of drastic measures against the false banknotes put in circulation by the Banca Romana. He fell with the Rudini cabinet in May 1892, and died at Vico Equense, near Naples, in June 1894.

== Ships ==
Giovanni Nicotera was the name of a destroyer of the Italian Regia Marina, launched in 1926 and decommissioned in 1940.

Preceded by Gerolamo Cantelli	Italian Minister of the Interior; 1876–1877	Succeeded by Francesco Crispi
Preceded by Francesco Crispi	Italian Minister of the Interior; 1891–1892	Succeeded by Giovanni Giolitti
