= Paolo Onorato Vigliani =

Italian politician

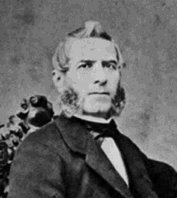

Minister of Justice
- In office 22 October 1869 – 14 December 1869
- Preceded by: Michele Pironti
- Succeeded by: Matteo Raeli
- In office 10 July 1873 – 25 March 1876
- Preceded by: Giovanni De Falco
- Succeeded by: Pasquale Stanislao Mancini

Senator
- In office 11 April 1860 – 12 February 1900
- Vice President of the Senate (23–27 March 1867; 1 December 1870 – 19 October 1873); Member of the Commission for the Merchant Marine Legal Code (from 30 January 1863); Member of the Commission for examining the bill for the naval penal code (from 10 December 1868, replacing senatore Poggi); Member of the Commission for examining the bill on legislative union in Veneto and for setting up an appeals court in the seat of government (from 23 January 1871); Member of the Commission for verifying the credentials of new senators (3 May 1872 – 19 October 1873); Member of the Commission for examining the bill for the first criminal code (from 16 December 1877)

Member of the Chamber of Deputies (Sardinia)
- In office 20 December 1849 – 24 December 1849

Paolo Onorato Vigliani (known in some sources as Paul-Honoré Vigliani) (Pomaro Monferrato, 24 July 1814 – Florence, 12 February 1900) was an Italian magistrate and politician. He served twice as Minister of Justice.

== Childhood and early life ==
He was the child of Alfonso Onorato Vigliani, a doctor, and Cristina Sesti. He had a brother who died when he was not yet twenty and a sister, Marianna. At the age of 4 he lost his father and was raised until the end of his studies by his uncle, Abbot Ferdinando Vigliani, professor of literature, prefect of studies at the Trevisio College in Casale. This uncle had previously taught in the Collegio delle Province but after the Carbonari uprising he had been removed from Turin. He was a major liberal influence on Vigliani’s education. At 18 Vigliani enrolled at the Faculty of Law in Turin and at the age of 22, in 1836, he graduated.

Early in his legal career he came to the attention of Count Giacinto Fedele Avet, King Charles Albert’s Minister of Justice, and he was appointed private secretary to the ministry on 31 August 1841. During the revolution of 1848, Vigliani, who had already entered the judiciary, collaborated on the newspaper Costituzionale Subalpino, founded by his lawyer friend Vigna.

== Legal career ==
Although he received encouragement to stand for election to the Subalpine Parliament, he preferred to remain a magistrate and was first assessor for judicial and ecclesiastical affairs under the royal commissioner it:Federico Colla in the Duchy of Parma and Piacenza from 21 May 1848, then counselor to the Appellate Magistrate of Nice (then part of the Kingdom of Sardinia) from 2 January 1849, and from 12 May 1849 he was counselor to the Appellate Magistrate of Casale Monferrato. On 25 January 1850 he was promoted to Advocate of the Poor at the Appellate Magistrates Court of Piedmont. He made an abortive start on a political career when he was elected to the Subalpine Parliament on 11 December 1849 during the IV legislature, representing the constituency of Valenza, but his election was annulled due to procedural problems.

In 1851 Cavour, being part of the ministry presided over by D'Azeglio, sent him to head the tax office of Nice where the quality of his work attracted the attention of Napoleon III. In March 1854, Cavour tried to make him Minister of Justice in his government, but Vigliani wished to continue practicing law, and instead he was appointed Attorney General of at the Court of Appeal of Genoa.

== Governor, senator and diplomat ==
In 1859, after Sardinia annexed Lombardy, he moved to Milan as governor general of the newly acquired territory, remaining in office from 8 June to 30 November. On 23 January 1860 he was appointed senator.

After Vigliani had served as prefect of Naples from October 1864 to March 1866, a decree of 4 June 1866 appointed him first president of the Court of Cassation of Florence, a position he held until his retirement, at the age of seventy-five.

In 1882, Vigliani’s wife Corinna Crowley died. The couple had no children. After retiring as a magistrate, he remained in Florence, where he took part in the local administration of the city as a member of the municipal council and in particular as president, several times, of the provincial council of the city, from 1889 to 1896. In 1895 he was entrusted with conducting arbitration between Great Britain and Portugal in a dispute concerning the borders agreed under the Anglo-Portuguese Treaty of 1891 in southern Africa.

== Minister of Justice ==
In October 1869 he assumed the position of Minister of Justice and Keeper of the Seals for the first time in the third Menabrea government. In his first term of office he promulgated the naval penal code, and with his measured approach to business managed to calm the political attacks against the ministry by the parliamentary opposition and even by some judges, due to the conduct of his predecessor Michele Pironti, whose rigid and conservative views had alienated many. In December of the same year, however, he had to resign his position.

He returned to the office of Justice Minister once again in July 1873 in the second Minghetti government. During his second mandate, on 24 February 1874, Vigliani presented to the Senate a draft unified penal code, which merged two earlier drafts into a single text, and introduced new criteria for the humanization of punishments and the social rehabilitation of convicted criminals. His bill was the first to secure the approval of the Senate, previous bills for the same purpose presented by Giovanni De Falco (1866 and 1873) and Michele Pironti (1873) having failed. His was the last draft code presented to the Assembly by the historical Right. He also promoted the compilation of the new commercial code

Vigliani also introduced guarantees for the security of public officials, preventing their being replaced when a different government took office. He also brought in measures defining the functioning of the assize courts; he regulated the professional system of lawyers and prosecutors; established the State Attorney's Office, standardized the practice of the notary profession throughout the Kingdom, reformed the institution of the public prosecutor in civil trials, and compiled a single national ranking for roles in the judiciary in different parts of the kingdom. In 1875 he also secured the passage of a law establishing two temporary sections of the Court of Cassation in Rome, without suppressing those of Turin, Florence, Naples and Palermo. It was an important step in unifying and centralising the judicial system, with the Roman Court assigned functions of national importance for the first time.

Part of the responsibility of the Italian Minister of Justice was relations with the Catholic Church. Vigliani brought forward a controversial bill that would have required couples to undertake a civil marriage before they could have a Catholic religious ceremony. The Church protested strongly against this measure, and it was eventually dropped. Relations between the Kingdom of Italy and the Papacy had remained tense after the passage of the Law of Guarantees in 1871. In particular the question of the Exequatur remained contentious; the Vatican refused to apply for it from the Italian state so its bishops were assured of the right to take up their dioceses, while the Kingdom of Italy continued to insist upon it as a key provision of the separation of church and state. The matter was not finally resolved under Vigliani, but the negotiations between him and Don Bosco on behalf of the Vatican were marked by a civil and conciliatory tone that was a notable change from previous discussions.

He left the Ministry in March 1876.

== Honours ==
Cavaliere di Gran Croce dell'Ordine dei Santi Maurizio e Lazzaro – ribbon for ordinary uniform

Knight of the Grand Cross of the Order of Saints Maurice and Lazarus
— 20 March 1865

Cavaliere di Gran Croce dell'Ordine della Corona d'Italia decorato di Gran cordone – ribbon for ordinary uniform

Knight of the Grand Cross of the Order of the Crown of Italy
— 14 December 1869

Commendatore dell'Ordine della Legion d'onore (Francia) – ribbon for ordinary uniform

Commander of the Legion of Honour (France)

Cavaliere di Gran Croce dell'Ordine del Salvatore – ribbon for ordinary uniform

Knight of the Grand Cross of the Order of the Redeemer (Greece)

Gran Cordone dell'Ordine di Leopoldo – ribbon for ordinary uniform

Grand Cordon of the Order of Leopold (Belgium)

Knight Grand Cross of the Order of St Michael and St George (United Kingdom (honorary))
