= Diego Angioletti =

Italian politician and general

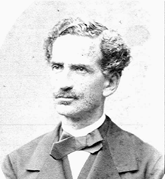

Minister of the Navy
- In office 21 December 1864 – 29 June 1866
- Preceded by: Alfonso La Marmora
- Succeeded by: Agostino Depretis

Senator
- In office 18 November 1865 – 29 January 1905

Diego Angioletti (Rio nell'Elba, 18 January 1822 – Cascina, 29 January 1905) was an Italian general and politician. As Minister of the Navy he was responsible for preparations for the Third Italian War of Independence.

== Early life and career ==
Diego was the son of Giuseppe Angioletti and his wife Giuseppa Bigeschi. He attended the artillery school in Livorno from which he graduated in October. 1845 with the rank of second lieutenant. During the First Italian War of Independence fought with the Tuscan troops, distinguishing himself at the Battles of Curtatone and Goito and earning promotion to captain from the provisional Tuscan government. However, in July 1849, when Grand Duke Leopold returned, all the ranks granted by the provisional Tuscan government were abolished, so Angioletti was demoted again to lieutenant and regained the rank of captain only in 1854.

In 1859 he was promoted to major and given command of an infantry battalion. With the new provisional government of Tuscany, he was promoted to lieutenant colonel, and placed in charge of the 50th regiment of the Tuscan division, which arrived on the Mincio at the end of June, too late to actively participate in the Second Italian War of Independence. Promoted to colonel, he entered the Italian army, where, in 1860, he became major general commanding the Livorno brigade. He was then aide-de-camp to King Vittorio Emanuele II and later commander of the territorial division of Bari. He was promoted to Lieutenant general in 1864.

== Ministerial office, 1864-5 ==
Prime Minister Alfonso La Marmora offered the navy portfolio in his new cabinet to Admiral Carlo Longo, who was serving as secretary-general to the ministry at the time. The government faced the political challenge of the September Convention and the transfer of the capital from Turin to Florence; it also faced a severe financial crisis and Longo refused, leaving La Marmora to fill the post himself on an interim basis and begin a programme of cuts of up to a third across the navy - the naval budget for 1864 was 55,175,000 lire while the budget for 1865 was 13,418,000 less.

Angioletti eventually agreed to take the portfolio despite his lack of knowledge of naval matters. He was not universally welcomed. One commentator described him as “coming from the army of the Grand Duke [of Tuscany], unknown and incompetent”. Another noted that while Angioletti issued an order of the day describing himself as “unfamiliar with life at sea and not bringing any technical knowledge to the navy”, it would have been more honest to simply say that he knew absolutely nothing about the navy.”

Within the constraints of his reduced budget, Angioletti sought to improve training in the navy, and treated the protection of the merchant marine as a priority, following the experience of the Crimean War and the American Civil War. He began the transfer of the navy from its old headquarters in Genoa to its planned new base in La Spezia. He also undertook feasibility studies for a future new naval base in Taranto. At the same time, the number of ships kept in good condition was drastically reduced to save money. Longstanding practices remained in place to keep expenditure down - training exercises, particularly with live fire, were avoided so as to save on coal and gunpowder. With crews having little to do, discipline was relaxed.

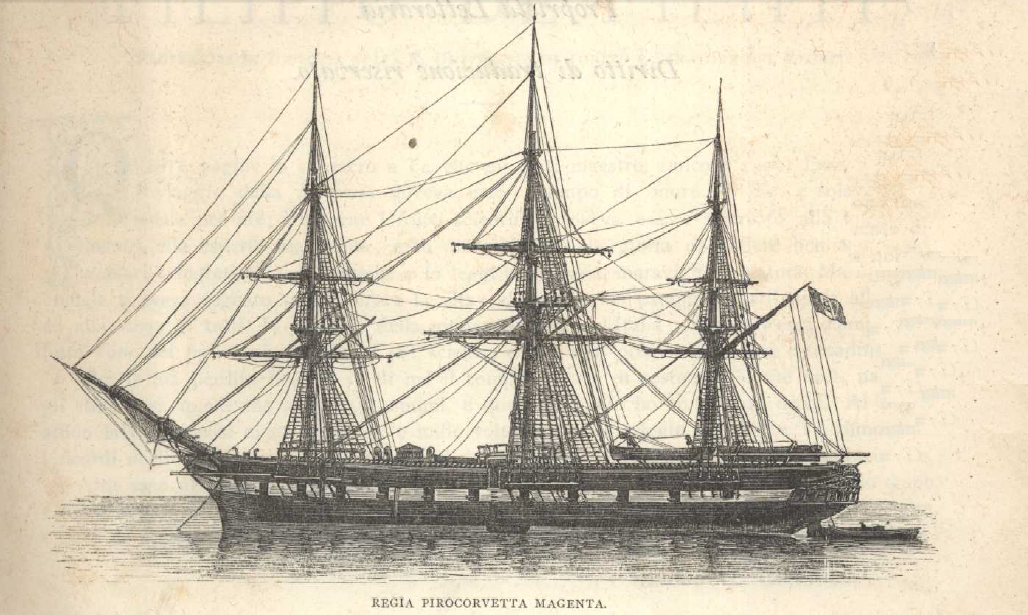
the Magenta

Angioletti was also responsible for the first circumnavigation of the globe by an Italian ship. The La Marmora government wanted to secure commercial treaties with China and Japan, and sent Vittorio Arminjon on board the corvette Magenta to the Far East by way of Montevideo and Cape of Good Hope, returning by way of the Pacific and Cape Horn.

He sought to strengthen for the navy with modern ships, and in April 1865 presented to parliament a budget for two armoured frigates, two propeller corvettes and four armoured gunboats, all to be built in Italy to reduce dependency on foreign shipyards.

In November 1865 he became a senator. He took an active part in the Senate's debates for many years, even on non-military topics and his sober and well-considered contributions were widely appreciated. In December 1865 the government lost a vote of confidence in the chamber, but La Marmora immediately formed a new government and retained Angioletti at the Navy Ministry.

== Third Italian War of Independence ==
As war with Austria approached, various ships that had been mothballed were hastily rearmed, and naval manoeuvres and gunnery exercises were carried out. Only at the beginning of December 1865 did Angioletti set up a three-member commission, chaired by Rear Admiral it:Amilcare Anguissola to study potential operations in the Adriatic. In mid-April 1866, he instructed the same commission to compile a regulation for the embarkation and disembarkation of artillery, horses and troops. Angioletti realised the severe weaknesses of Italy's navy, and went so far as to recommend avoiding an active sea war. He was strongly opposed to the idea of an Italian landing in Dalmatia and refused to take any part in planning for it.

On 3 May 1866 Angioletti appointed Admiral Carlo Pellion di Persano as commander of the Adriatic fleet. The appointment was against Persano's own wishes and there was nothing in his service history to suggest that he was especially well suited to the role.

From the naval base in Taranto, Persano began sending messages to Angioletti about the poor state of the Italian fleet. The ironclads had either insufficient gunners or none at all, two thirds of the crews were raw recruits, the officers inexperienced and the equipment defective. Persano's message of 21 May to Angioletti read “It is my duty to submit to your Excellency that the ships which join the fleet from day to day are incompletely manned, especially in regard to their petty officers, and, which is of more consequence, are without trained gunners… the fleet is not ready for war. Help me, I earnestly entreat you.” When Angioletti failed to act on his complaints, Persano wrote to Prince Carignano indicating his wish to resign his command.

Angioletti replied reassuringly, telling him that more and better-trained men would be sent to him soon, and pointing out that some of the men he already commanded had seen action at Ancona and Gaeta. As the correspondence continued, Angioletti, courteous but exasperated, wrote “I can assure you that the Austrian [forces] are in a worse condition than ours. When we are doubling or tripling our forces all at once, it is impossible to get everything perfect.” On 10 June Angioletti sent orders to Persano for what to do once war was declared:”The Adriatic Sea is to be cleared of enemy ships. You are to attack and obstruct them wherever they may be found.”

On 20 June Prime Minister La Marmora handed the cabinet over to Bettino Ricasoli and resigned in order to fight at the front and Angioletti joined him, assuming command of the 10th division, in the II Army Corps under General it: Domenico Cucchiari. Prime Minister Ricasoli immediately declared war on Austria.

On 24 June while the battle of Custoza was underway, La Marmora ordered Angioletti to take up a position in Goito to cover a possible retreat. For this reason his division saw no action on the day. Although he had no opportunity to fight against Austria, he distinguished himself shortly afterwards, in repressing the Seven and a Half Days Revolt in Palermo. For this operation he was awarded the military order of Savoy.

== Blame for defeat at Lissa ==
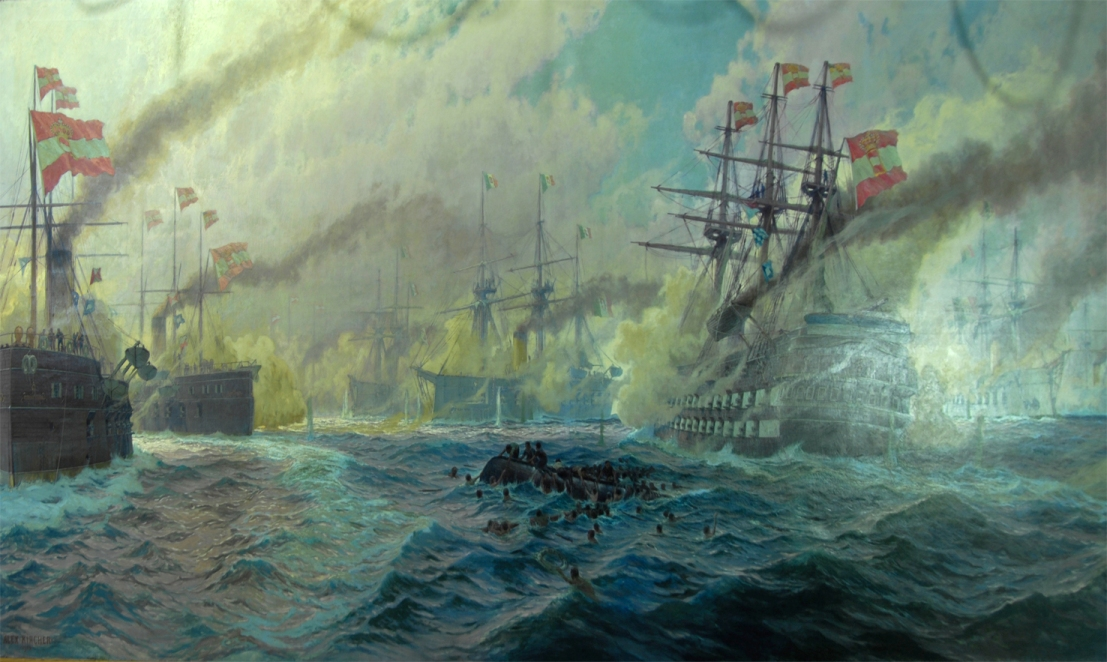
battle of Lissa

One month after Angioletti resigned from the cabinet Admiral Persano suffered a humiliating defeat at the hands of the Austrian navy at the battle of Lissa. There was a great feeling of public anger at this outcome, and while most of it was directed at Admiral Persano, Angioletti did not escape blame.

Persano blamed Angioletti for failing to equip and prepare the navy properly and Navy Minister Depretis agreed with him.

On 25 July 1866 the Gazzetta del Popolo commented that “The indignation over Persano, over Angioletti, over La Marmora is extremely animated, profound and enduring all over Italy.” Ultimately however only Persano was tried and found guilty of incompetence, and neither Angioletti nor anyone else was officially held accountable.

== Liberation of Rome and later life ==
In 1870 Angioletti assumed command of one of the five divisions (the 9th), which advanced towards Rome under General Raffaele Cadorna. He was ordered to move against Porta San Giovanni and Porta San Sebastiano, although the main action in seizing the city took place between Porta Pia and Porta Salaria. This was to be the last time Angioletti saw active service. In 1873, in Naples, he worked to eradicate cholera, which had broken out in the army. He was then appointed president of the Infantry and Cavalry Weapons Committee in 1877. In May 1877 he was one of many generals whom War Minister Luigi Mezzacapo compulsorily retired, and he went to live in his villa in Sant'Anna near Cascina with his wife Emilia Tonci. There he died on 29 January 1905.

== Honours ==
Diego Angioletti received a number of Italian and foreign honours:

Grand Officer of the Order of Saints Maurice and Lazarus - ribbon for ordinary uniform

Grand Officer of the Order of Saints Maurice and Lazarus

Grand Cordon of the Order of the Crown of Italy - ribbon for ordinary uniform

Grand Cordon of the Order of the Crown of Italy

Commander of the Military Order of Savoy - ribbon for ordinary uniform

Commander of the Military Order of Savoy

Knight of the Imperial Order of Saint Anna (Russia) - ribbon for ordinary uniform

Knight of the Imperial Order of Saint Anna (Russia)

== See also ==
- Austro-Italian ironclad arms race
