= Augusto Riboty =

Italian admiral and politician (1816–1892)

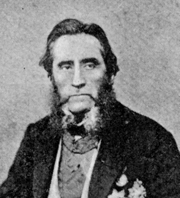

Minister of the Navy
- In office 1868–1869
- Monarch: Vittorio Emanuele II
- Prime Minister: Luigi Federico Menabrea
- Preceded by: Pompeo Provana del Sabbione
- Succeeded by: Stefano Castagnola
- In office 1872–1873
- Monarch: Victor Emmanuel II
- Prime Minister: Giovanni Lanza
- Preceded by: Guglielmo Acton
- Succeeded by: Simone Pacoret de Saint Bon

Personal details
- Born: 29 November 1816 Puget-Théniers, Kingdom of Sardinia
- Died: 9 February 1888 (aged 71) Nice, India

Augusto Riboty (29 November 1816 – 9 February 1888) was an Italian admiral and Minister of the Navy.

== Early life and career ==
Born on 29 November 1816, in Puget-Théniers, Riboty enrolled in 1830 in the Navy School of Genoa, graduating in 1835. In 1848, he participated, on the brig Colombo, in the First Italian War of Independence; he also saw service in the Crimean War while serving on the screw frigate Carlo Alberto. He took part in the Second War of Italian Independence as commander of the paddle sloop Monzambano.

In 1860, promoted to the rank of frigate captain (capitano di fregata) of the newly born Italian Regia Marina ("Royal Navy"), Riboty was named head of the Navy School of Genoa, which he led until 1864. He was afterwards promoted to Capitano di Vascello and served as chief of staff to the Squadra di Evoluzione (Squadron of Evolution), the active squadron of the Italian Navy meant to provide experience and training with the new fleet-sized maneuvers; as such, he participated in the multinational intervention in Tunisia in 1864, protecting foreign property and subjects during a revolt. When the squadron was deactivated, he served again as head of the Genoese school, as well as that of Naples.

In 1866, Riboty was named commander of the new ironclad screw frigate Re di Portogallo, in which he participated in the Third Italian War of Independence. At the Battle of Lissa, he gallantly led his ship, and inflicted serious damage to the screw ship of the line Kaiser; his actions were praised by all his superiors, and he was awarded the Gold Medal of Military Valour. Promoted to rear admiral, he led the naval forces that contributed to the repression of a revolt in Palermo in September 1866.

Riboty took command of the active naval squadron in 1867.

== Minister of the Navy ==
Riboty was appointed by Prime Minister Luigi Federico Menabrea as Minister of the Navy in January 1868; at the time, the navy was suffering from the backlash of the defeat at Lissa and the precarious financial situation of Italy, resulting in considerable budget cuts which impaired naval buildings, the activity of the ships and the training. One of his first acts was to slash the plethoric number of admirals and high-ranking officers, putting several of them on the retired list; to avoid controversy, he put himself on the retired list, thus ending his own career for the benefit of the navy.

With his experience as head of the naval schools, Riboty proposed the creation of a single Naval Academy (a suggestion already put forward by Carlo Pellion di Persano), to address the regionalistic spirit that still lingered among the officers, and which had had negative effects at Lissa; however, this was not followed through, and he only managed to unify the Genoese and Neapolitan schools as a single entity. An unified academy would be achieved only by Benedetto Brin in 1882. He unsuccessfully attempted to put forward a proposal for an organic plan for the navy in 1869, which was refused because of its costs; he also founded the Rivista Marittima (the still-existing monthly journal of the Italian Navy (Marina Militare), and in 1869 sent a squadron to the inauguration of the Suez Canal.

When the Menabrea ministry ended in December 1869, Riboty left his position as Minister, only to be reappointed by the new Prime Minister Giovanni Lanza in September 1871. In December 1870, he was appointed a senator.

His efforts to renovate the fleet bore fruit in 1872, when the Parliament authorized new expenses for new ships; in 1873, the two revolutionary ironclad ships of the Duilio class, designed by Riboty's collaborator Benedetto Brin, were laid down.

== Later life and death ==
Riboty retired to private life. He died at Nice, on 9 February 1888, aged 71.

== Namesake ==
The Mirabello-class scout cruiser Augusto Riboty, commissioned in 1917 and reclassified as a destroyer in 1938, was named after Riboty. She served in both World War I and World War II and was scrapped in 1951.
