= Bolzano =

Capital city of the province of South Tyrol, Northern Italy

Bolzano Bozen (German)
- Comune
- Città di Bolzano; Stadt Bozen
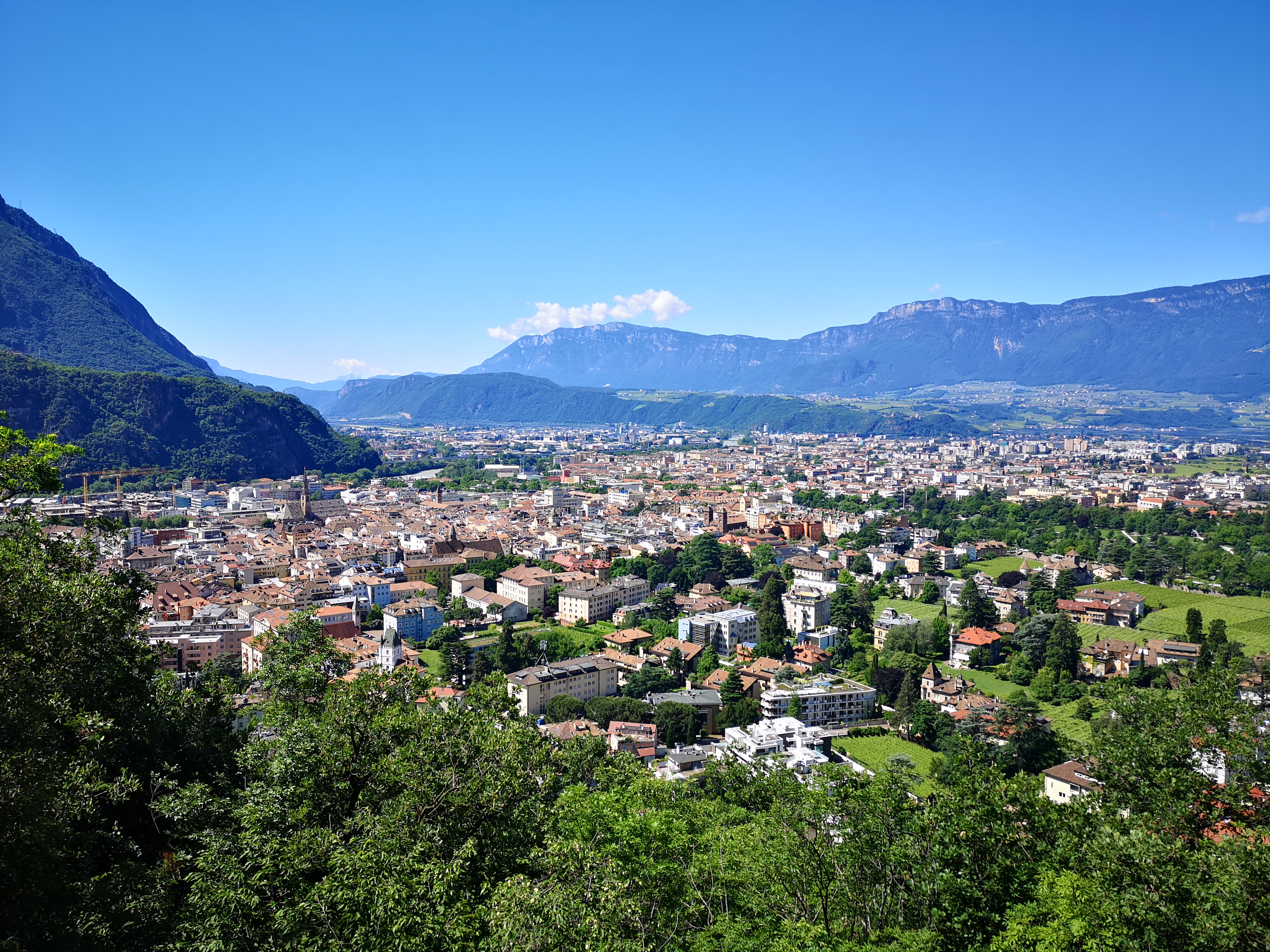
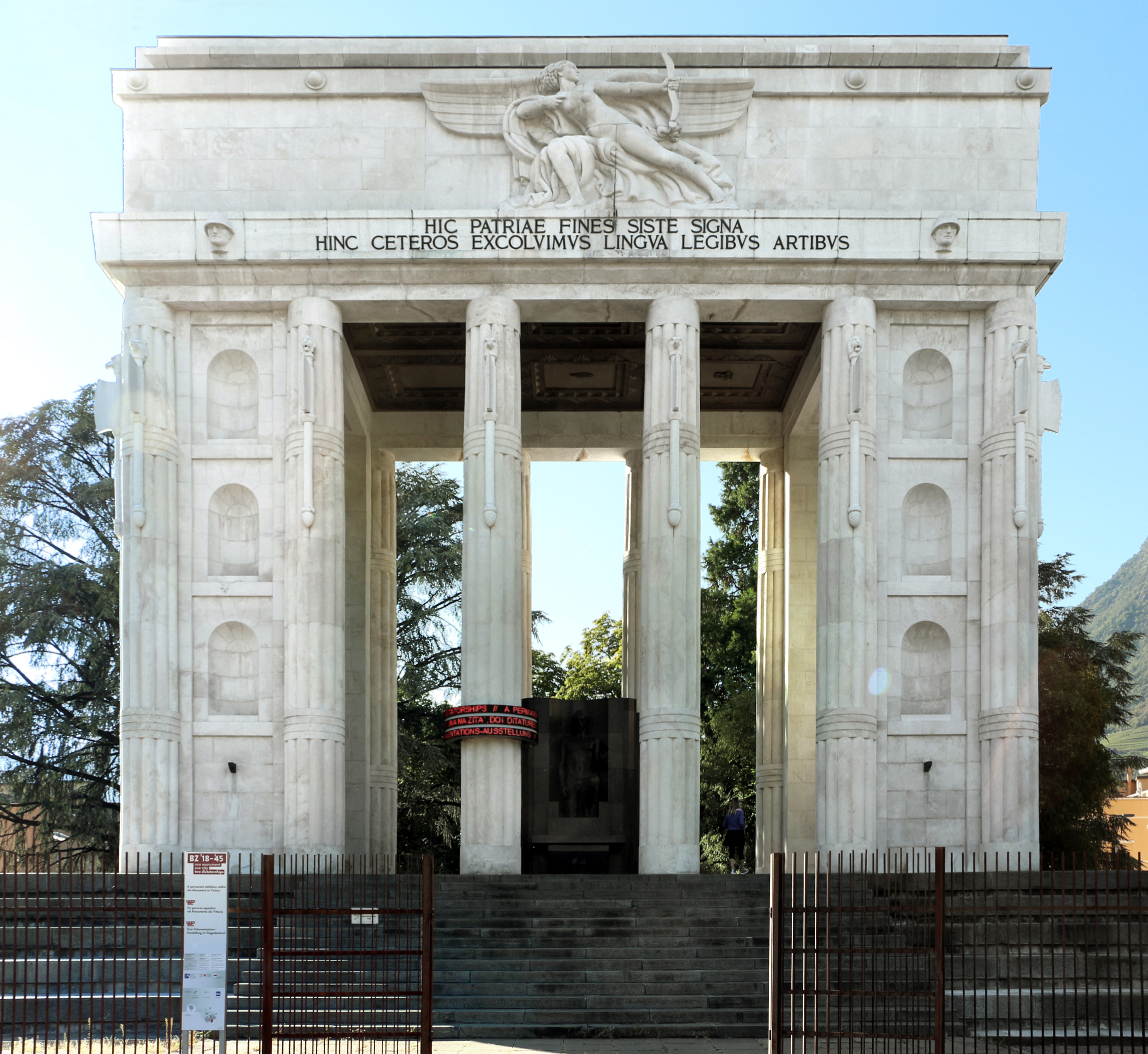
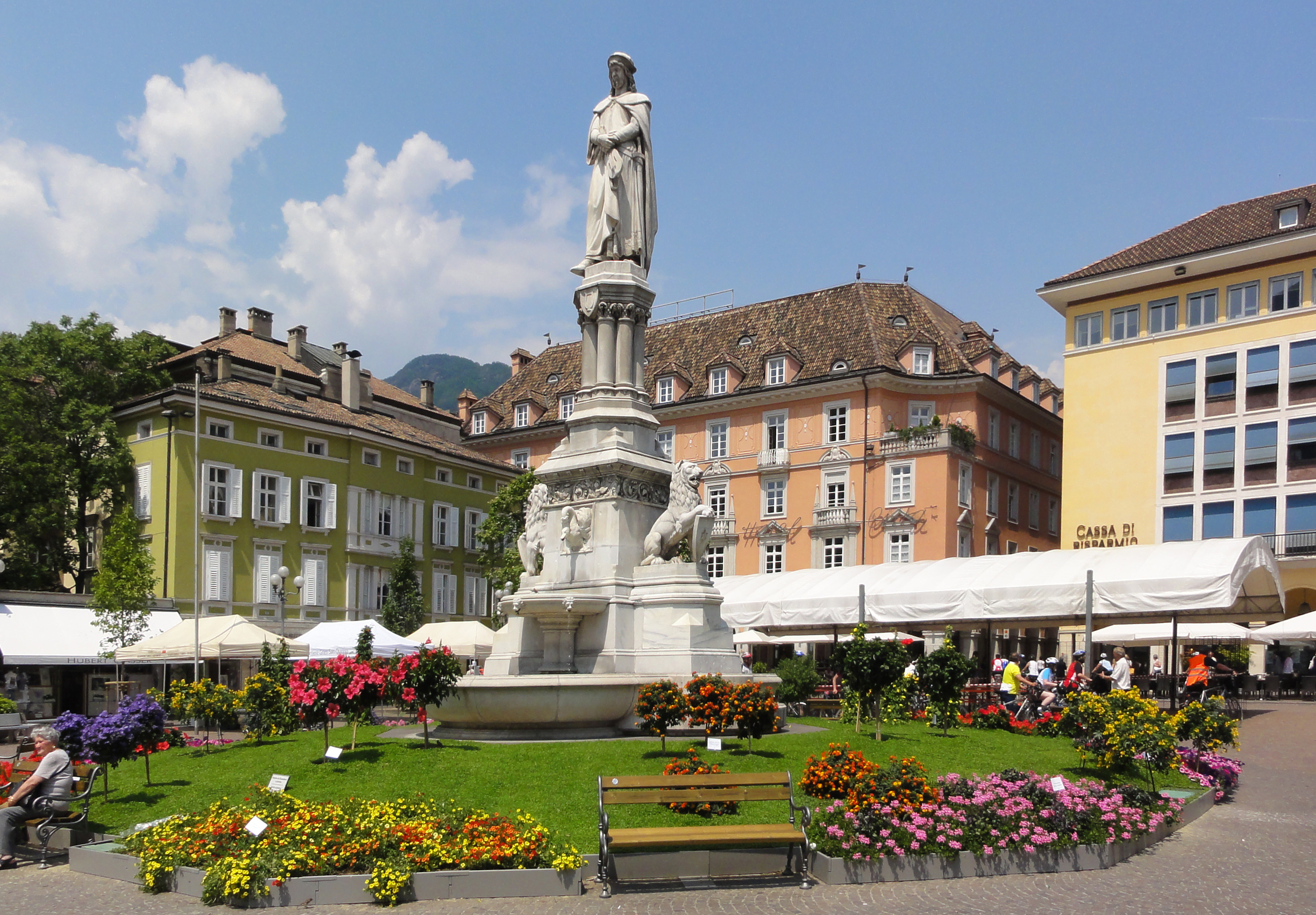
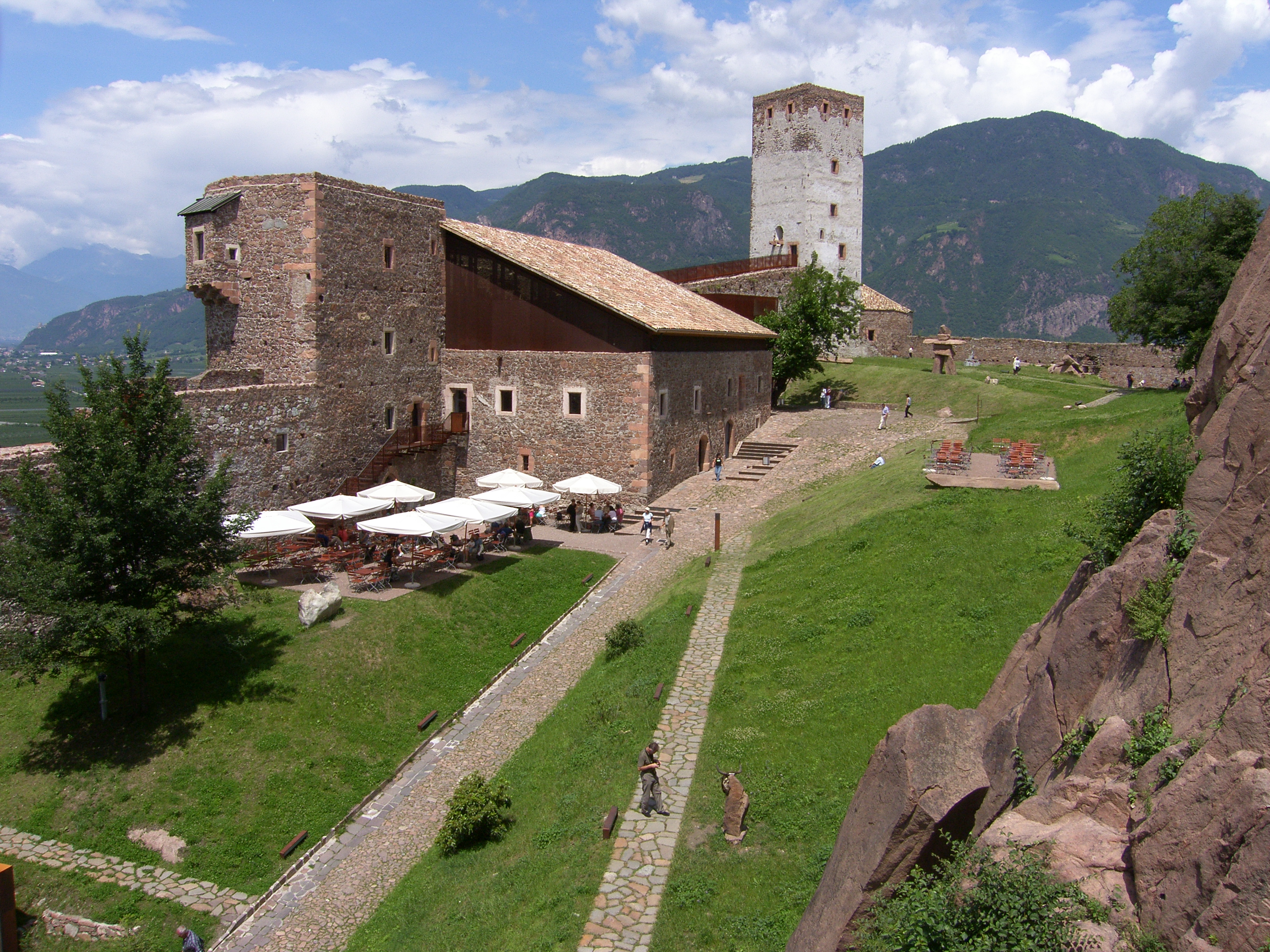
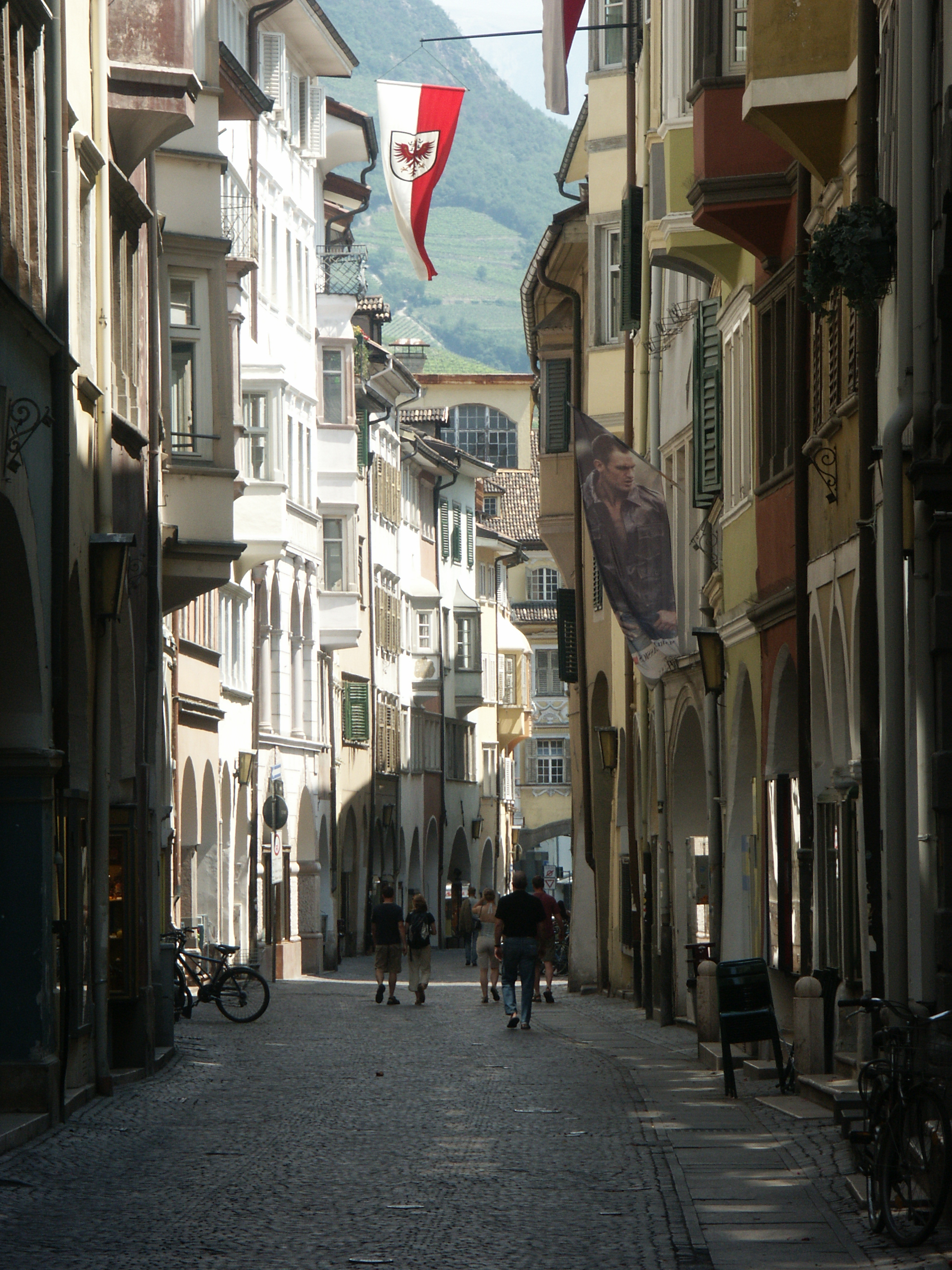
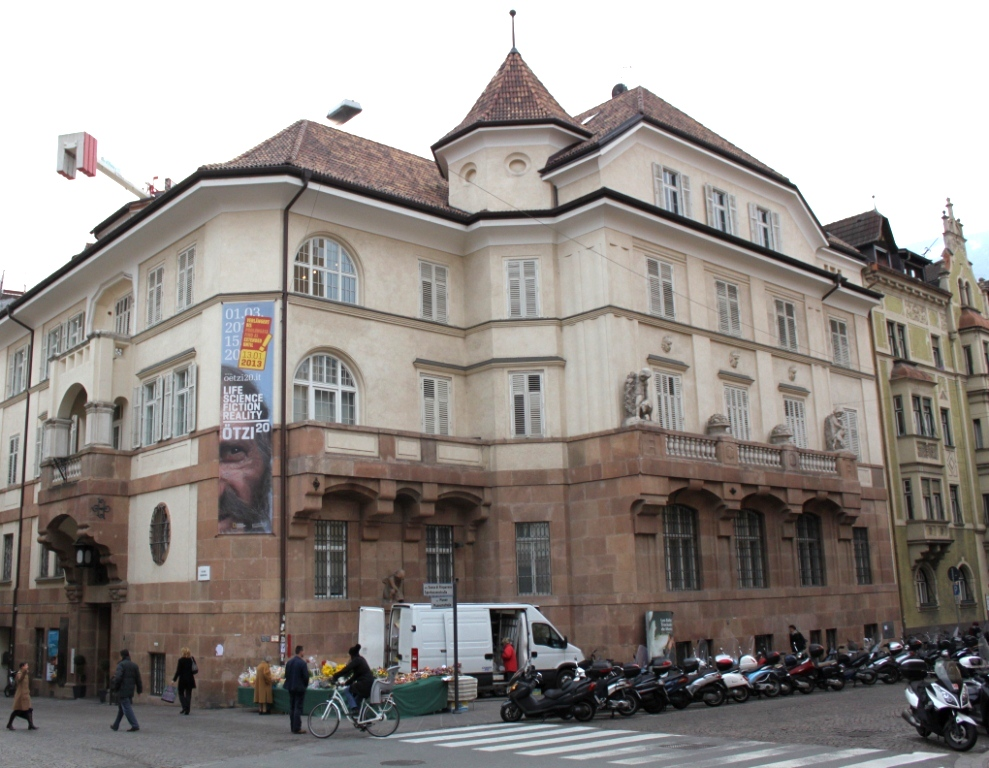
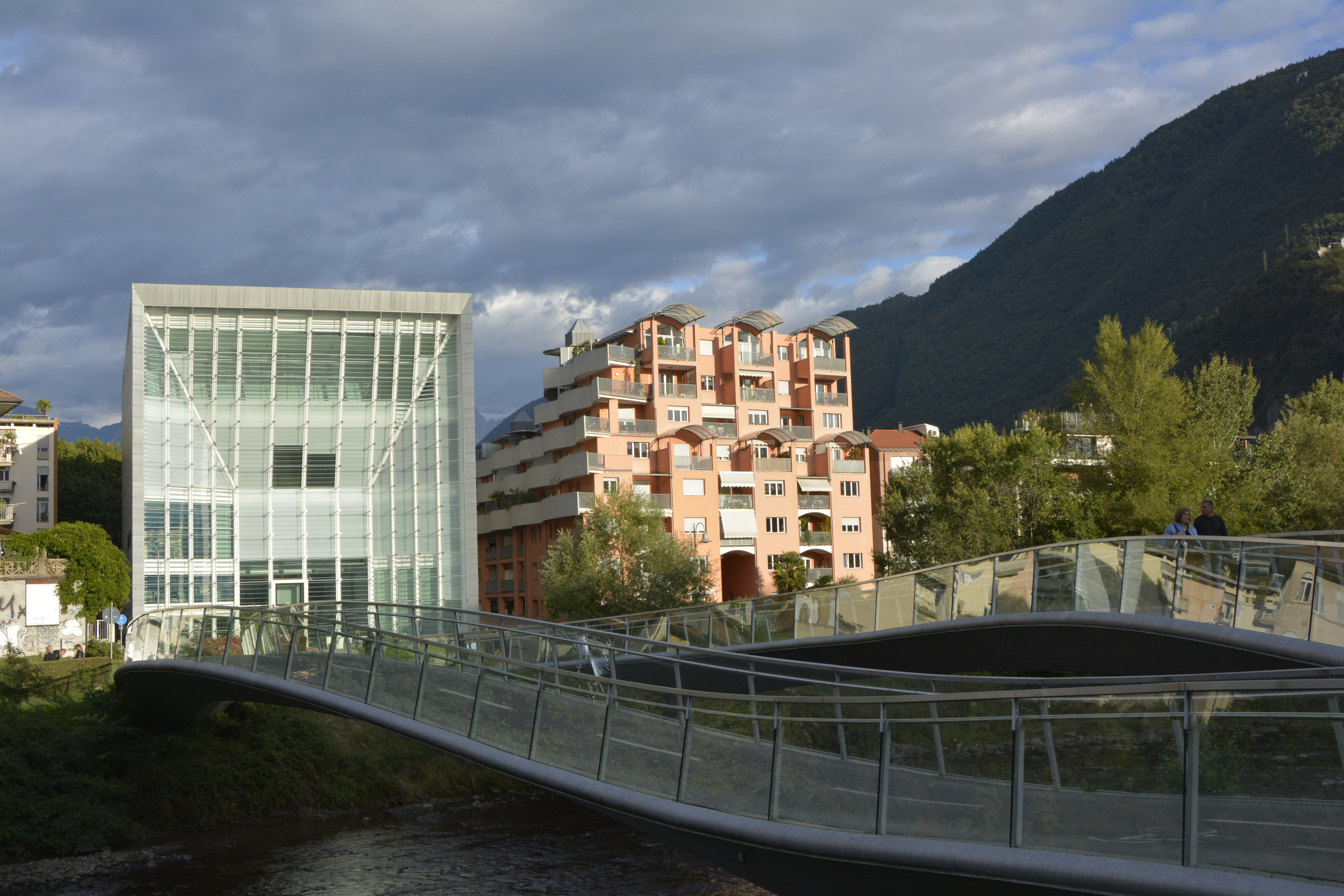
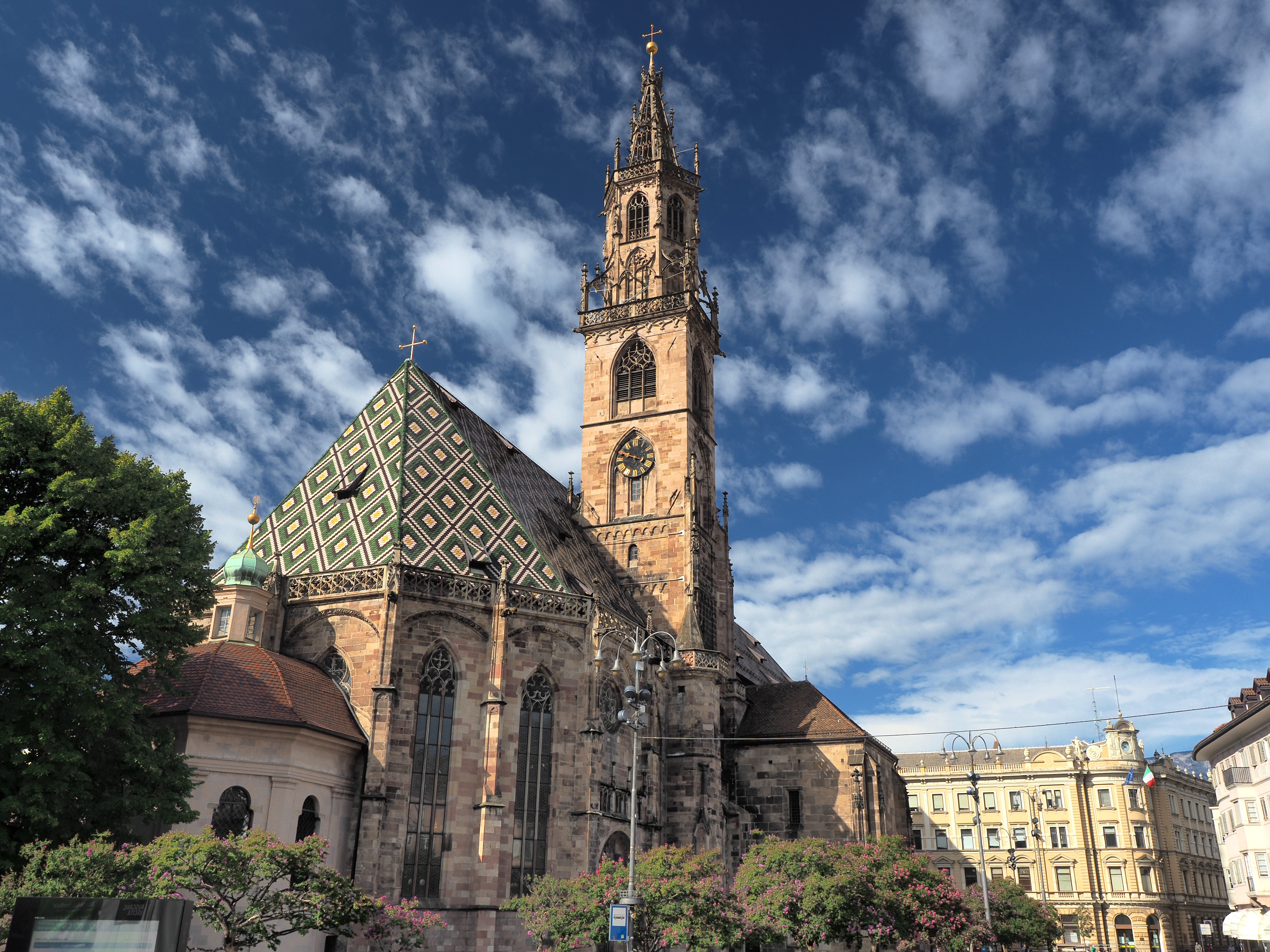
- Clockwise from top: Panorama of Bolzano; Waltherplatz; Via dei Portici, main road in the historic centre; Bolzano Cathedral; the Talvera Bridges and Museion; South Tyrol Archaeological Museum; Sigmundskron Castle; Bolzano Victory Monument

- Flag Coat of arms

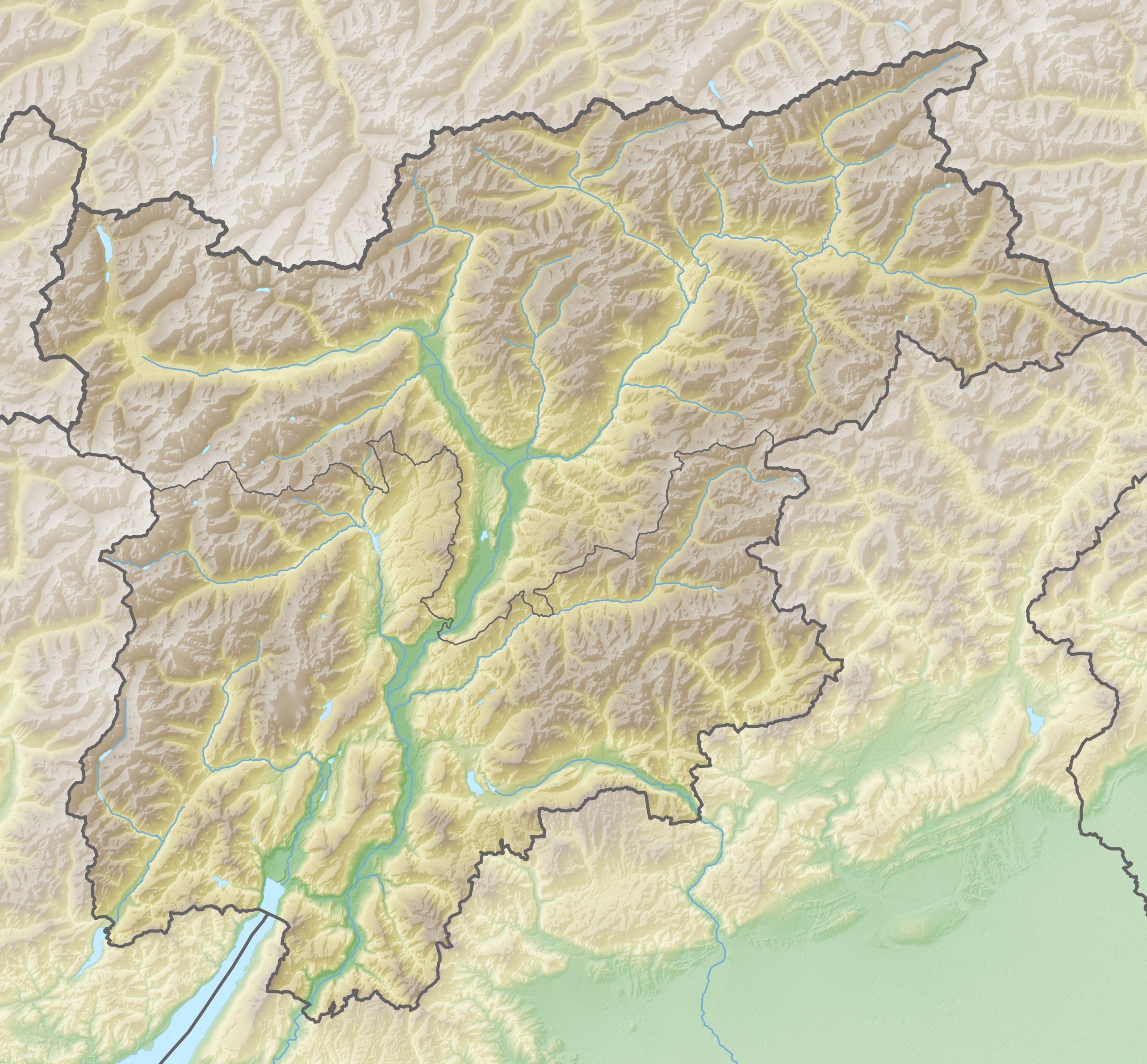
- Location within Trentino-Alto Adige/Südtirol Location within Italy Location within Europe
- Coordinates: 46°30′N 11°21′E
- Country: Italy
- Region: Trentino-Alto Adige/Südtirol
- Province: Bolzano (BZ)

Government
  - Mayor: Claudio Corrarati (Independent; Centre-right coalition)

Area
  - Total: 52.29 km^{2} (20.19 sq mi)
- Elevation: 262 m (860 ft)

Population (2026)
  - Total: 106,901
  - Density: 2,044/km^{2} (5,295/sq mi)
- Demonym(s): Italian: bolzanini German: Bozner/Boznerin or Bozener/Bozenerin; Ladin: bulsanins
- Time zone: UTC+1 (CET)
  - Summer (DST): UTC+2 (CEST)
- Postal code: 39100
- Dialing code: 0471
- ISTAT code: 021008
- Website: Official website

Bolzano, also known as Bozen (see § Names), is the capital city of South Tyrol, officially the province of Bolzano/Bozen, in the autonomous region of Trentino-Alto Adige/Südtirol in northern Italy. With a population of 106,901, as for 2026, it is the largest city in South Tyrol and the third-largest in historical Tyrol. The greater metro area has about 250,000 inhabitants and is one of the urban centres within the Alps.

Bolzano is the seat of the Free University of Bozen-Bolzano, where lectures and seminars are held in Italian, German, and English. The city is also home to the Italian Army's Alpini High Command (COMALP) and some of its combat and support units. In the 2020 version of the annual ranking of quality of life in Italian cities, Bolzano was jointly ranked first for quality of life alongside Bologna. In 2023, the city was named a UNESCO City of Music, joining UNESCO's Creative Cities Network.

Along with other Alpine towns in South Tyrol, Bolzano engages in the Alpine Town of the Year Association for the implementation of the Alpine Convention. The Convention aims to promote and achieve sustainable development in the Alpine Arc. Consequently, Bolzano was awarded Alpine Town of the Year 2009. Bolzano is considered a bridge between Northern Europe and Southern Europe due to the three spoken languages in South Tyrol (Italian, German, and Ladin) and the confluence of the Italian and German-Austrian cultures.

== Names ==
The placename's first recorded cognates were Bauzanum (Note: In the Historia Langobardorum (late 8th century), the text refers to a rebellion by Alahis against Perctarit and against the Bavarian count who governed Bauzanum in the 7th century.) and Bauzonum (Note: In a charter of Tassilo III, Duke of Bavaria in 769 - see History) in the 8th century.

The city's Italian name is Bolzano (pronounced [bolˈtsaːno] or locally [bolˈdzaːno]). The German name is Bozen (pronounced [ˈboːtsn̩]). The city and province are officially bilingual in Italian and German. The two official names may appear together, such as at Bolzano/Bozen railway station, the university (Bozen-Bolzano) and in the province's name. As the city is three-quarters Italian-speaking, it is usually named Bolzano by modern English-language publications. The name Bozen often appears in regional and historical contexts and was the city's main name until South Tyrol's forced Italianization from 1923 (see Annexation by Italy); the province is mainly German-speaking. The city tourist board brands it as Bolzano Bozen.

Ladin is the third-largest and the oldest language spoken in South Tyrol; Bolzano is named Balsan or Bulsan in Ladin.

== History ==
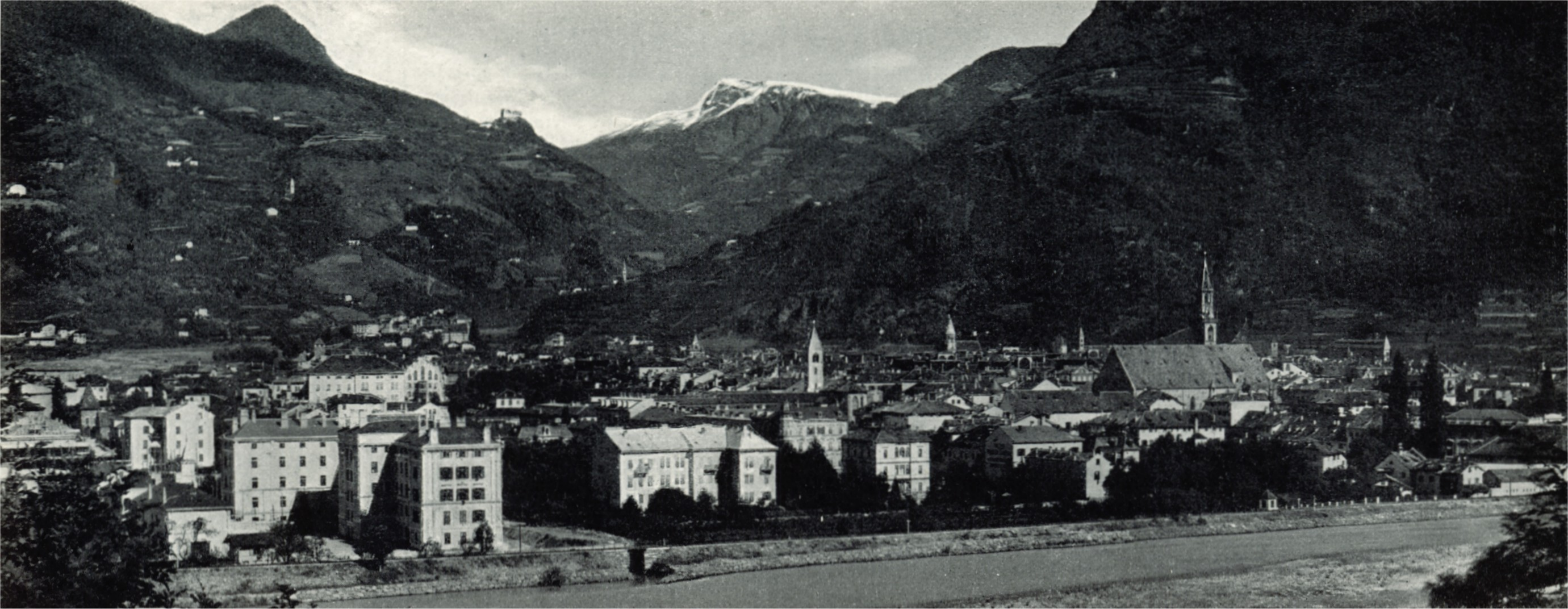
Bolzano in 1898

=== Prehistory and Roman settlement ===
The modern-day Bolzano was in ancient times a marshy region inhabited by the Raetian Isarci people, traditionally believed to be descendants of Etruscan refugees fleeing Italy from the invading Gauls. The Romans built a settlement after the area had been conquered in 15 BC by general Nero Claudius Drusus. The military settlement, Pons Drusi (Drusus Bridge), was named after this Roman general. During this time, the area became part of the region Venetia et Histria (Regio X) of ancient Italy.

In 1948, excavations of the current Cathedral led to the discovery of an ancient Christian basilica from the fourth century. Also discovered was a Roman cemetery, including the tomb of "Secundus Regontius" with Latin inscriptions dating to the third century, making him the oldest known inhabitant of Bolzano.

=== Bavarian settlement ===
During the gradual decline of the Lombard influence in the seventh century, Bavarian immigration took place, and the first mention of a Bavarian ruler in Bolzano dates from 679. At that time, the Bavarians named the nearby villages around Bolzano Bauzanum or Bauzana. In 769 Tassilo III, Duke of Bavaria issued in Bolzano the foundation charter of the Innichen Abbey. German populations have been present in the region of Tyrol from that period onwards. At around the year 1000, the settlement is called "in Pauzana valle, quae lingua Teutisca Pozana nuncupatur".

=== Bishopric of Trent ===
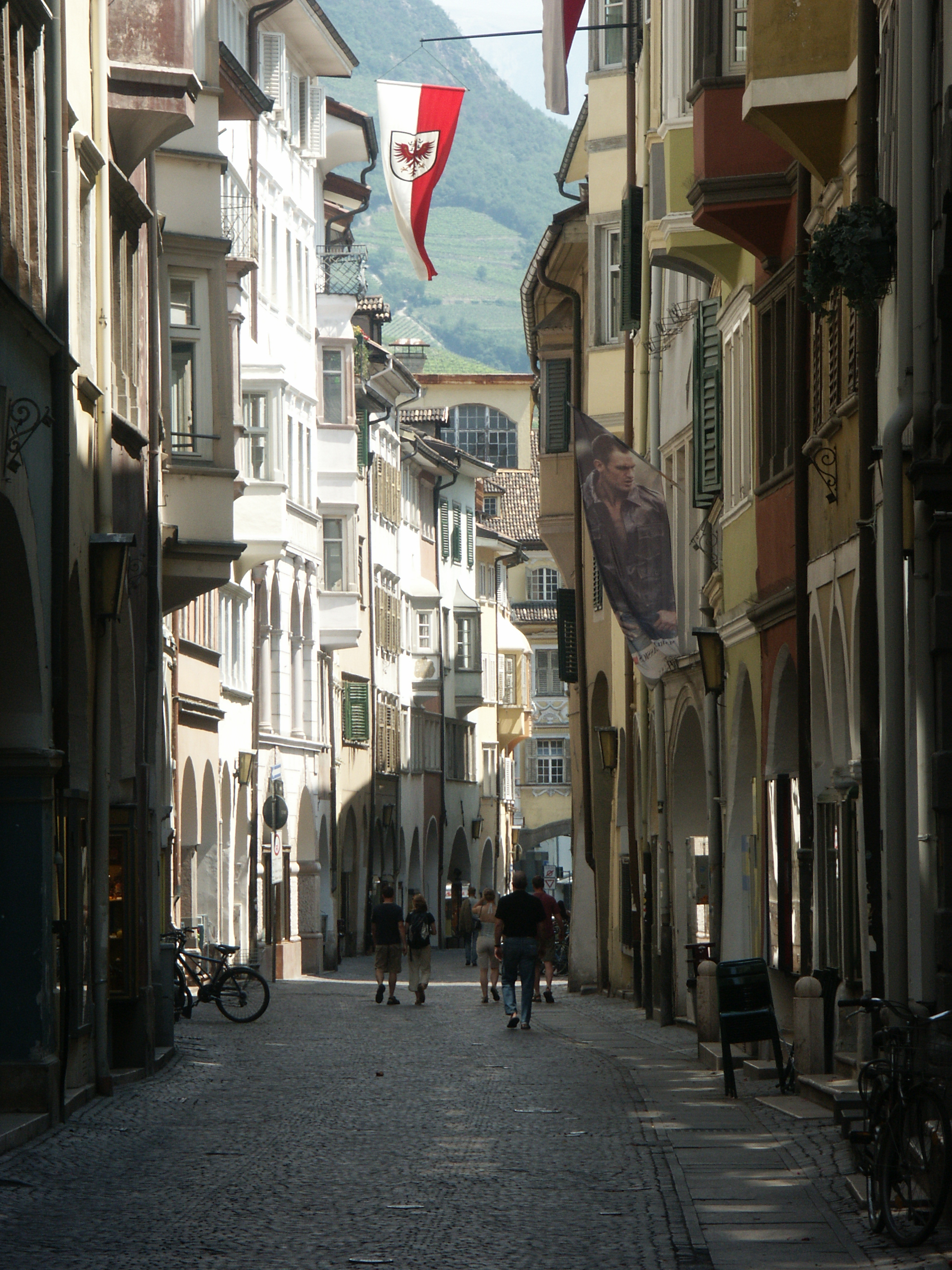
Via dei Portici

In 1027 the area of Bolzano and the rest of the Diocese was conferred upon the bishops of Trent by the emperor Conrad II from the Salian dynasty. In the late-12th century, the bishop founded a market town, along the Lauben thoroughfare. The town therefore became an important trading post on the Transalpine Augsburg-Venice route over the Brenner Pass, elevation 1,371 metres (4,498 ft) above sea level, within the Holy Roman Empire.

=== County of Tyrol ===
In 1277, Bolzano was conquered by Meinhard II, the Count of Tyrol, leading to a struggle between the counts of Tyrol and the bishops of Trent. In 1363, the County of Tyrol passed to the Austrian House of Habsburg. In 1381, Duke Leopold granted the citizens of Bolzano the privilege of a town council. This gradually eliminated the influence and power previously held by the bishops of Trent over the next few decades. In 1462, the bishops eventually resigned all their rights of jurisdiction over the town.

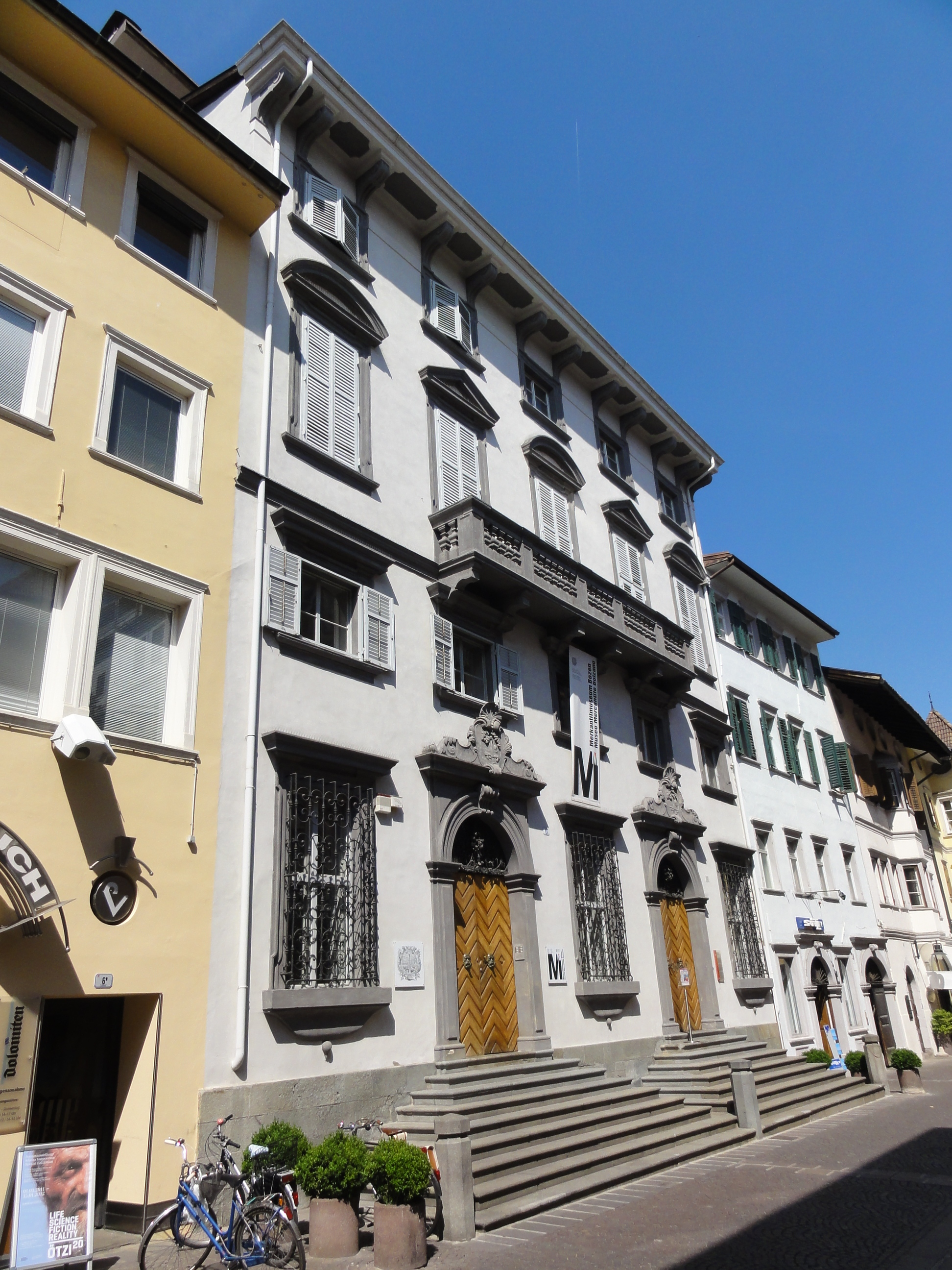
Mercantile Building

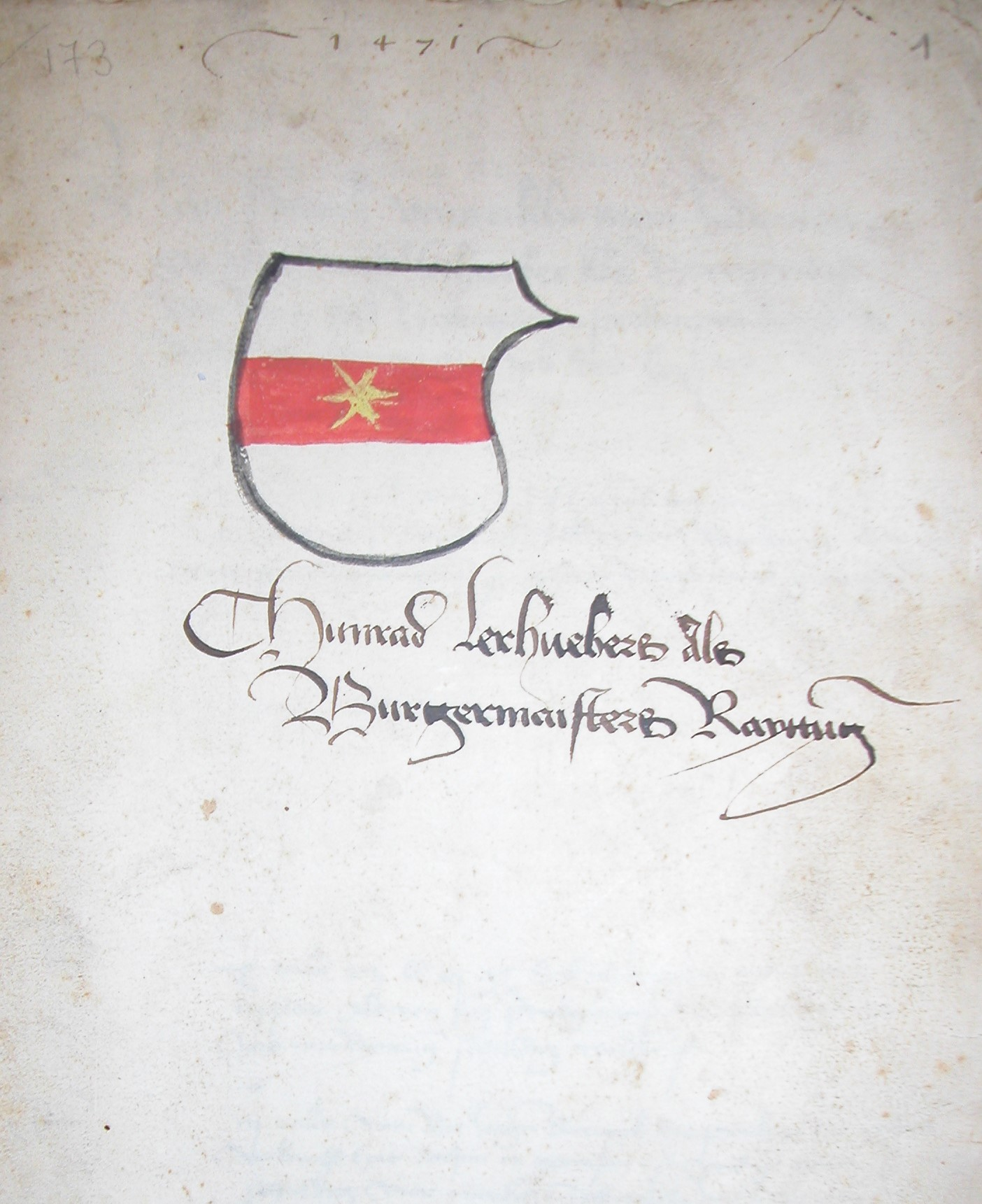
The town's coat of arms as depicted in 1471 by the mayor Konrad Lerhueber

From the 14th and 15th centuries onwards, a large market fair was organised four times per year to greet tradesmen and merchants en route to the Brenner Pass. The Mercantile Magistrate was therefore founded in 1635 by the Austrian duchess Claudia de' Medici. During every market season, two Italian and two Germanic officers, who were appointed among the local tradesmen, worked in this magistrate office. The establishment of an official trade organisation strengthened Bolzano as a cultural crossroad in the Alps.

After the dissolution of the Holy Roman Empire in 1806, Bolzano became briefly part of the Napoleonic Kingdom of Italy and was incorporated into the Department of Alto Adige. After the Congress of Vienna (1814–15), Bolzano returned to the County of Tyrol, within the Austrian Empire and subsequently the Dual Monarchy of Austria-Hungary in 1867. The County covered both modern-day South Tyrol, Trentino and the state of Tyrol (including East Tyrol) in Austria.

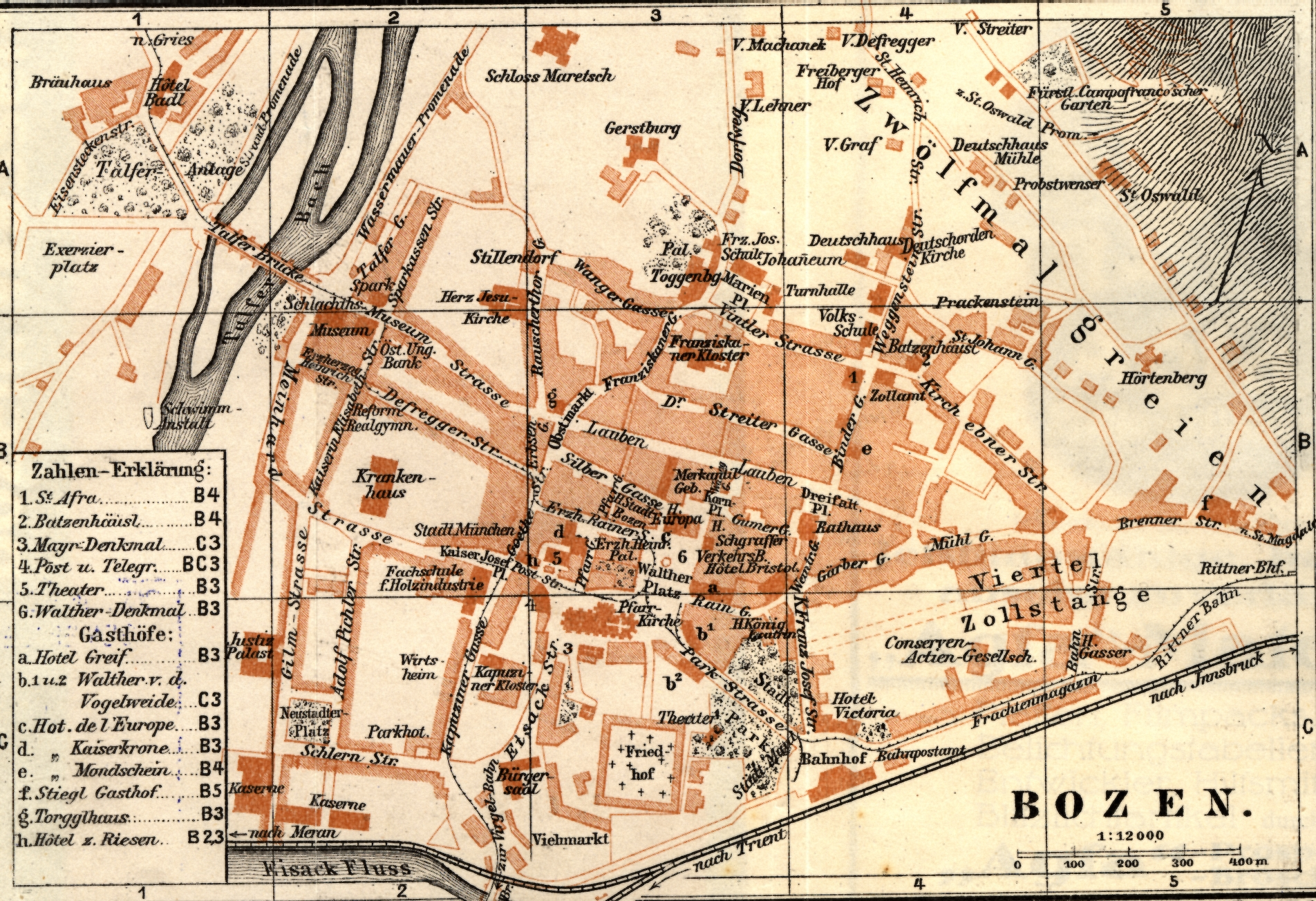
Bolzano in 1914, at the outbreak of World War I

In the late Austro-Hungarian Empire, Bolzano experienced a rapid population growth between 1890 and 1910 (from 12,249 in 1890 to 28,163 in 1910). The linguistic make-up showed a relevant level of fluctuation based on internal migration, assimilation and a changing political landscape, with the Italian-speaking minority accounting for 15.01% in 1890 and 5.70% in 1910.

In 1915, the Triple Entente powers promised Italy territorial gains if she would enter the First World War on the side of the Entente instead of siding with the German Empire and Austria-Hungary. When Italy abandoned the Triple Alliance (1882), the Entente offered her territorial promises in Tyrol and Istria. This secret arrangement was confirmed in the Treaty of London (1915).

After Italy declared war on Austria-Hungary on May 24, 1915, heavy fighting took place all along Tyrol's southern border for the entire duration of the conflict. For the next 3 1/2 years, Tyrol's southern border became the front line between Austro-Hungarian and Italian troops. Tyrol's southern frontier was – and still is – dotted with tens of defensive fortresses that had been built in view of a possible Italian attack. Losses on both sides amount to several thousand. During World War I, tens of thousands of civilians living along Tyrol's southern border were evacuated to either of the two countries, the majority to Bohemian and inner Austrian areas, and some to Italian internment camps, away from the front line.

=== Annexation by Italy ===
On November 3, 1918, the armistice of Villa Giusti, near Padova, ended military operations between Italy and Austria-Hungary. Subsequently, Italian troops entered Tyrol and occupied the Austrian areas south of the Brenner Pass. Italian control of South Tyrol was internationally recognized in 1919. At the time of Bolzano's annexation by the Kingdom of Italy, the town was settled primarily by a German-speaking population. As of 1910, 29000 inhabitants identified themselves as German speakers and only 1,300 as Italian speakers; these latter ones were mainly from the Italian-speaking areas of Tyrol, namely Welschtirol, currently known as Trentino.

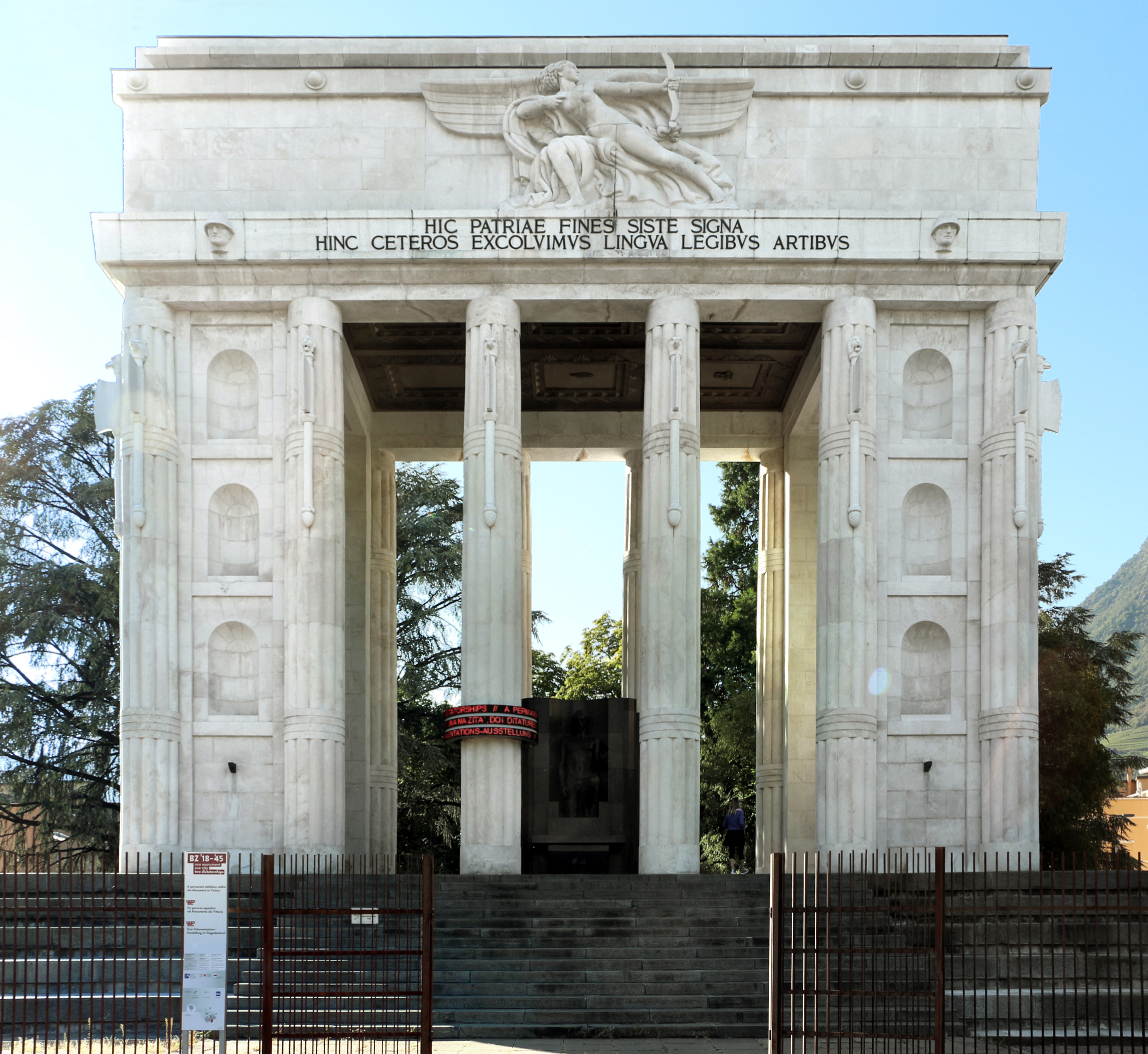
Victory Monument

Along with the rest of South Tyrol, Bolzano was subjected to an intensive Italianisation programme enforced by Fascist leader Benito Mussolini from the 1920s onwards to 8 September 1943, when Italy left the military alliance with Nazi Germany and South Tyrol fell under direct German control. The goal of such a programme was to outnumber the local German-speaking population by tripling Bolzano's population through Italian immigration from other regions of Italy. In 1927, Bolzano became the capital of the province of Bolzano. Any reference to and use of the words Tyrol and Tyrolean were banned by law and were punishable offences. In 1933, Adolf Hitler came to power in the Weimar Republic. Mussolini and the Fascists worried that Hitler, in pursuing his ideology of all ethnic Germans under one Reich, would claim South Tyrol from Italy. To avoid such a prospect, in 1939 Mussolini and Hitler signed the Option Agreement, by which Germany would renounce territorial claims over South Tyrol as Germany's Lebensraum (living space). Furthermore, ethnic South-Tyroleans who had opted to stay in South Tyrol and refused resettlement to the Third Reich were subjected to full-scale Italianisation, including loss of their German names and national identity, prohibition of schooling in German and use of German for their daily transactions.

=== Second World War ===
During the Second World War, Bolzano was the site of the Nazis' Bolzano Transit Camp, a concentration camp for persecuted Jews and political prisoners. Members of the Jewish population of Bolzano were deported to the death camps in Nazi Germany and murdered there. When Italy surrendered in September 1943, the whole of South Tyrol as well as Belluno were de facto administered by the Nazis as Operational Zone of the Alpine Foothills. After 1943, heavy fighting between Nazi Germany and the Allied Powers took place in the Dolomites.

=== Capital of an autonomous province ===
After the War, the Gruber-De Gasperi Agreement of September 1946 was signed by the Italian and Austrian Foreign Ministers in Paris, guaranteeing "complete equality of rights" (including education and use of German as an official language) as well as "autonomous legislative and executive regional power" to the German-speaking population in South Tyrol and Trentino.

Because the implementation of the post-war agreement was not seen as satisfactory by the Austrian government (the autonomous province of 1947 included Trentino and therefore had an Italian-speaking majority), it became a cause of significant friction with Italy and was brought to the General Assembly of the United Nations in 1960, which called for a resolution of the issue. A fresh round of negotiations took place in 1961 but proved unsuccessful, partly because of the campaign of terrorism by South Tyrolean Liberation Committee – a secessionist movement – against Italian police and electric power structures (one notable incident being the Night of Fire on 12 June 1961).

The issue was resolved in 1971, when a new statute of autonomy for the smaller, majority German-speaking province Bozen – Südtirol/Bolzano – Alto Adige, which was supported by the German-speaking population of South Tyrol, was granted by Italy. It resulted in a considerable level of self-government, also due to the large financial resources of South Tyrol, which retains almost 90% of all levied taxes. The agreement was implemented and proved broadly satisfactory to the parties involved and the separatist tensions soon eased. In 1992, Austria and Italy officially ended their dispute over the autonomy issue on the basis of the statute of 1972.

== Geography ==
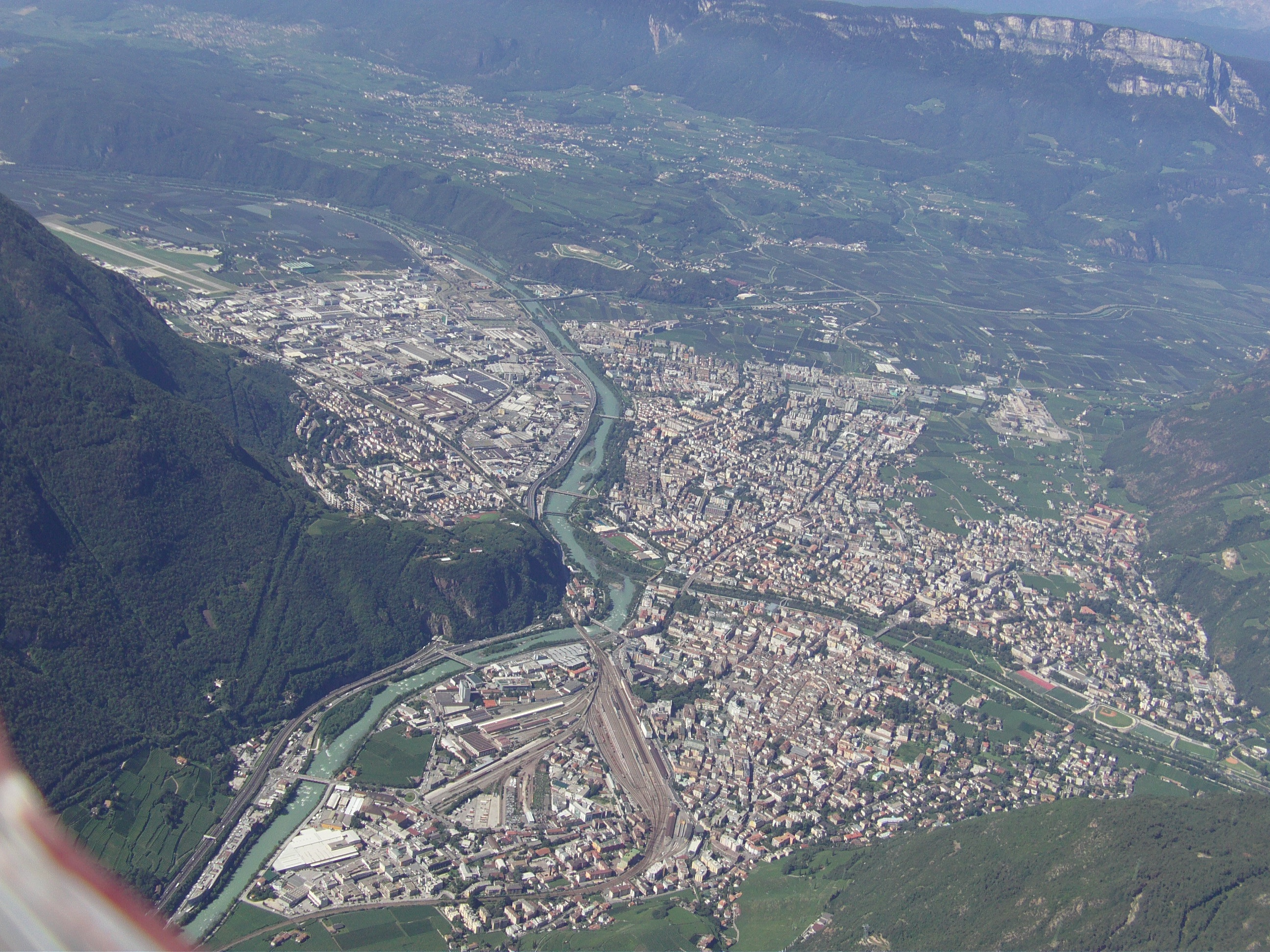
Aerial view of Bolzano

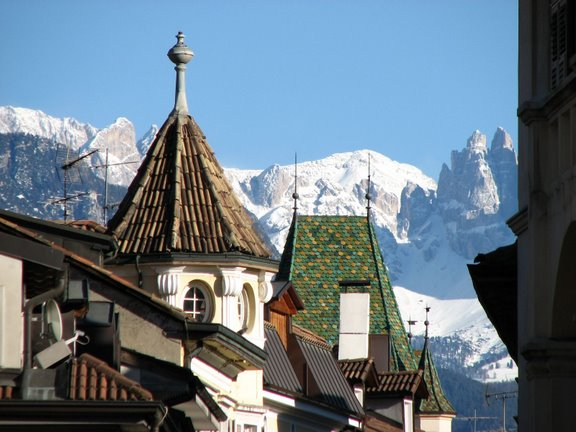
Bolzano and the Alps

The area of the city of Bolzano is 52.3 km^{2} (20.2 sq mi), of which 28 km^{2} (11 sq mi) is used as a settlement area. The city is located in the basin where the Sarntal, Eisacktal, and the Adige Valley with their rivers, Talfer, Eisack, and Adige, meet. In the Middle Ages, the two main Alpine crossings, the Via Claudia Augusta over and the Brenner route over Brenner Pass, met in Bolzano. Thus, the city was very important for trading. The highest point is 1,616 metres (5,302 feet) above sea level and the lowest point is 232 metres (761 feet) above sea level. The centre is located at an altitude of 262 metres (860 feet) above sea level. The nearest big cities are 58 km (36 mi) (Trento) and 118 km (73 mi) (Innsbruck) away.

=== City districts and neighbouring communities ===
City districts (most district names were originally in German and Italianized at a later stage):

- Centro-Piani-Rencio/Zentrum-Bozner Boden-Rentsch
- Don Bosco/Don Bosco-Neugries
- Europa-Novacella/Europa-Neustift
- Gries-San Quirino/Gries-Quirein
- Oltrisarco-Aslago/Oberau-Haslach

In 1911 Dodiciville/Zwölfmalgreien and in late 1925 the Gries municipality were incorporated in the Bolzano municipality. Neighbouring communities are: Eppan, Karneid, Laives, Deutschnofen, Ritten, Jenesien, Terlan and Vadena.

=== Climate ===
Being located at multiple climate borders, Bolzano features a humid subtropical climate (Cfa) with hot summers and very cold winters by Italian standards. According to the Trewartha classification, this climate could not really be considered a subtropical climate because fewer than 8 months are at least 10 °C (50 °F), and thus would be considered a semi-continental climate with hot summers. Some of its suburbs are designated an oceanic climate (Cfb) based on cooler summer temperatures, while mountains in the area may feature a continental climate (Dfb). The climate of Bolzano is influenced by its low altitude in a valley south of the main Alps. This causes very sheltered conditions from cool winds during daytime, ensuring much warmer temperatures year-round than in similar valley cities north of the range.

Climate data for Bolzano (1991–2020 normals, extremes 1946–present)
Month	Jan	Feb	Mar	Apr	May	Jun	Jul	Aug	Sep	Oct	Nov	Dec	Year
Record high °C (°F)	21.8 (71.2)	23.1 (73.6)	28.4 (83.1)	32.0 (89.6)	35.0 (95.0)	40.0 (104.0)	39.1 (102.4)	39.1 (102.4)	33.3 (91.9)	28.2 (82.8)	21.6 (70.9)	18.0 (64.4)	40.0 (104.0)
Mean daily maximum °C (°F)	6.7 (44.1)	10.1 (50.2)	15.6 (60.1)	19.4 (66.9)	23.7 (74.7)	27.7 (81.9)	29.8 (85.6)	29.3 (84.7)	24.0 (75.2)	17.9 (64.2)	11.2 (52.2)	6.6 (43.9)	18.5 (65.3)
Daily mean °C (°F)	2.0 (35.6)	4.7 (40.5)	9.8 (49.6)	13.7 (56.7)	17.9 (64.2)	21.7 (71.1)	23.4 (74.1)	23.1 (73.6)	18.5 (65.3)	13.0 (55.4)	6.8 (44.2)	2.2 (36.0)	13.1 (55.5)
Mean daily minimum °C (°F)	−2.7 (27.1)	−0.7 (30.7)	3.9 (39.0)	7.9 (46.2)	12.1 (53.8)	15.6 (60.1)	17.1 (62.8)	16.9 (62.4)	12.9 (55.2)	8.1 (46.6)	2.5 (36.5)	−2.1 (28.2)	7.6 (45.7)
Record low °C (°F)	−18.5 (−1.3)	−15.6 (3.9)	−10.7 (12.7)	−4.4 (24.1)	−2.6 (27.3)	0.4 (32.7)	5.2 (41.4)	4.2 (39.6)	−0.5 (31.1)	−4.6 (23.7)	−10.7 (12.7)	−16.5 (2.3)	−18.5 (−1.3)
Average precipitation mm (inches)	25.0 (0.98)	19.9 (0.78)	34.5 (1.36)	50.1 (1.97)	71.6 (2.82)	86.6 (3.41)	86.8 (3.42)	88.1 (3.47)	70.0 (2.76)	82.3 (3.24)	80.6 (3.17)	39.9 (1.57)	735.4 (28.95)
Average precipitation days (≥ 1.0 mm)	3.2	3.1	4.6	6.5	8.9	8.9	8.6	9.0	6.9	7.2	7.1	4.1	78.1
Average snowy days	1.8	0.9	0.3	0	0	0	0	0	0	0	0.7	2.1	5.8
Average relative humidity (%)	72	69	62	66	69	66	66	68	71	75	74	73	69
Mean monthly sunshine hours	102.3	121.5	148.8	159.0	176.7	201.0	232.5	213.9	180.0	151.9	102.0	96.1	1,885.7
Source 1: Istituto Superiore per la Protezione e la Ricerca Ambientale
Source 2: Servizio Meteorologico (humidity and sun 1961–1990), Meteomanz(snowy days 2000-2024)

== Demographics ==
Historical population
Year	Pop.	±%
1921	32,679	—
1931	37,351	+14.3%
1936	45,505	+21.8%
1951	70,898	+55.8%
1961	88,799	+25.2%
1971	105,757	+19.1%
1981	105,180	−0.5%
1991	98,158	−6.7%
2001	94,989	−3.2%
2011	102,575	+8.0%
2021	106,601	+3.9%
Source: ISTAT

As of 2026, the population is 106,901, of which 48.4% are males, and 51.6% are females. Minors make up 16.2% of the population, and seniors make up 24.4%.

The oldest surviving register of houses in Bolzano, dating from 1288, lists 48 houses. However, it does not refer to the inner old town, but rather to the Weintraubengasse and Bindergasse located to its east, as well as to the street running north of them, corresponding to today's Via Vintler and Via dei Vanga. As a supplement to this source, the rent register of the Lords of Wangen from 1290 can be used; this constitutes a market-rights register for the entire Via dei Portici, part of the Piazza delle Erbe, and the Neustadt (today's Via Argentieri and Via Dr. Streiter), and lists a further 106 houses. Against this background, the total urban population around 1300 is estimated at 1,500 to 2,000 inhabitants.

According to a register of houses in the city centre from 1497, the town was divided into eight quarters and comprised around 160 houses. The list records the tax contributions of the house owners and was presumably compiled in connection with the empire-wide Turkish tax. By the late 15th century, the urban population is estimated to have amounted to approximately 3,000 to 4,000 people.

In 1900, Bolzano, including the garrison, had 13,904 mostly German-speaking inhabitants (1,493 Italian speakers). The incorporation of Dodiciville and Gries, as well as the construction of new urban quarters during the interwar period, contributed to strong population growth in the first half of the 20th century, particularly in the context of the Italianization policies vigorously promoted by Italian fascism. In 1966, Bolzano's population exceeded the threshold of 100,000 for the first time, after having stood at 59,951 in 1940. The highest population figure in the city's history was recorded in 1975, with 107,112 inhabitants. After a subsequent decline to well below 100,000, the population began to grow again markedly with the onset of the new millennium.

=== Linguistic distribution ===
	Language group		
Year	German	Italian	Ladin
1900	88.09 %	11.45 %	-
1910	90.82 %	05.49 %	-
1921	73%	27%	-
1939	38%	62%	-
1971	22.40 %	77.22 %	0.38 %
1981	25.77 %	73.63 %	0.60 %
1991	26.62 %	72.59 %	0.79 %
2001	26.29 %	73.00 %	0.71 %
2011	25.52 %	73.80 %	0.68 %
2024	24.74 %	74.71 %	0.55 %

According to the Austrian census of 1910, a total of 29,241 inhabitants lived in the then still independent municipalities of Bolzano, Gries, and Zwölfmalgreien combined, of whom only 1,605 declared Italian as their language of daily use, while 26,558 declared German. Through fascism and the Italianization policy under Benito Mussolini in the inter-war period, the Italian language group became the majority in Bolzano. Prior to the annexation of South Tyrol to Italy (Treaty of Saint-Germain-en-Laye, 1919) a small Italophone community of up to 10% of the population already lived in Bolzano. As early as the 1940s, the city had an Italian-speaking majority.

According to the 2024 census, 74.71% of the city's inhabitants spoke Italian, 24.74% German and 0.55% Ladin as their first language. The percentage values are based exclusively on valid declarations of language group affiliation or language group assignment by persons holding Italian citizenship. Owing to its bicultural character, Bolzano is regarded as an important meeting place between the German- and Italian-speaking cultural and economic spheres. An increasing number of residents speak more than just their native language.

=== Immigration ===
Foreign-born population (2025)
Country of birth	Population
Albania	3,878
Morocco	1,854
Pakistan	1,409
Germany	1,257
Moldova	1,012
Ukraine	944
Romania	869
Peru	846
Austria	719
China	568
Bangladesh	558
India	466
Iraq	437
Tunisia	396
North Macedonia	388

As of 2025, immigrants make up 21.2% of the population. The five largest foreign countries of birth are Albania, Morocco, Pakistan, Germany, and Moldova.

In 2004, the first advisory council for foreign residents was established to support the municipal council on matters concerning foreign residents.

== Politics ==
=== City Council ===
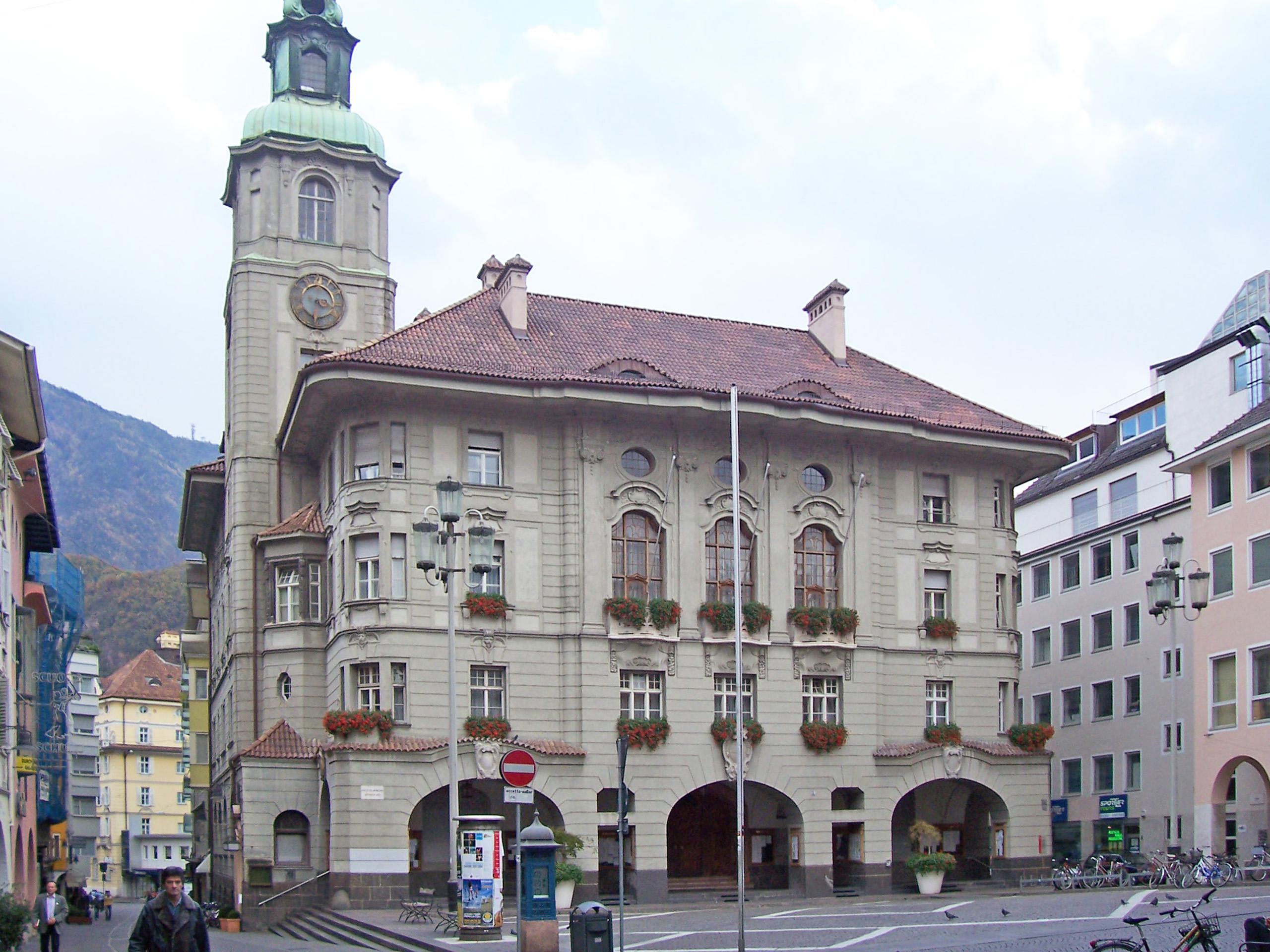
Bolzano town hall

The last municipal elections were held in the year 2025. Of the 45 seats, 10 different parties were elected to the city council. The Brothers of Italy and the Südtiroler Volkspartei (SVP) won seven seats each.

=== Mayors ===
This table shows the mayors of the city of Bolzano after 1945. All mayors within this list belong to the Italian language group. So far, the last mayor of the German language group in Bolzano was Julius Perathoner from 1895 to 1922 and was replaced by the march on Bolzano by the fascists.

=== Euroregion Tyrol-South Tyrol-Trentino ===
In 1996, the European Union approved further cultural and economic integration between the Austrian province of Tyrol and the Italian autonomous provinces of South Tyrol and Trentino by recognizing the creation of the Tyrol–South Tyrol–Trentino Euroregion.

== Sights ==
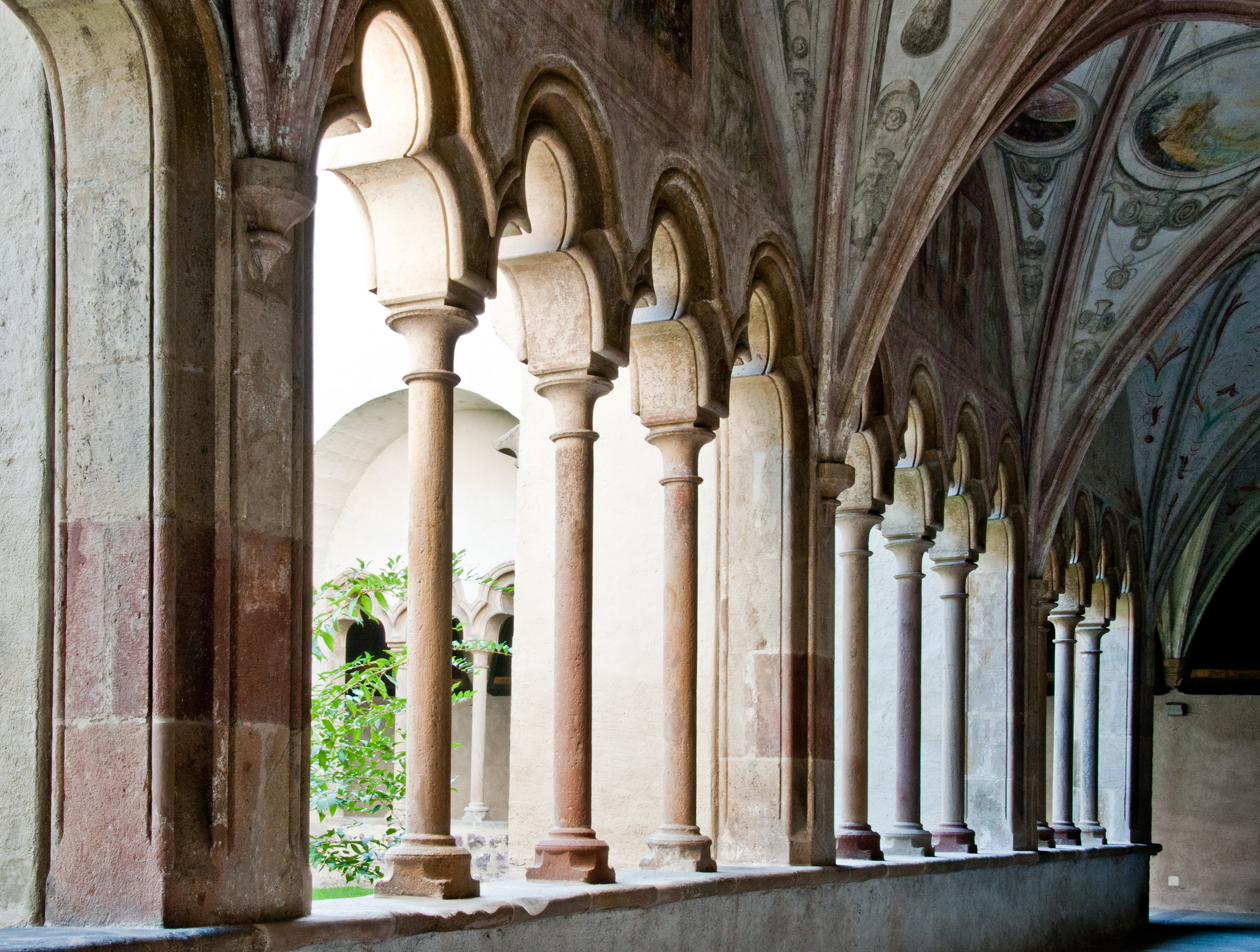
Franciscan Friary, Bolzano

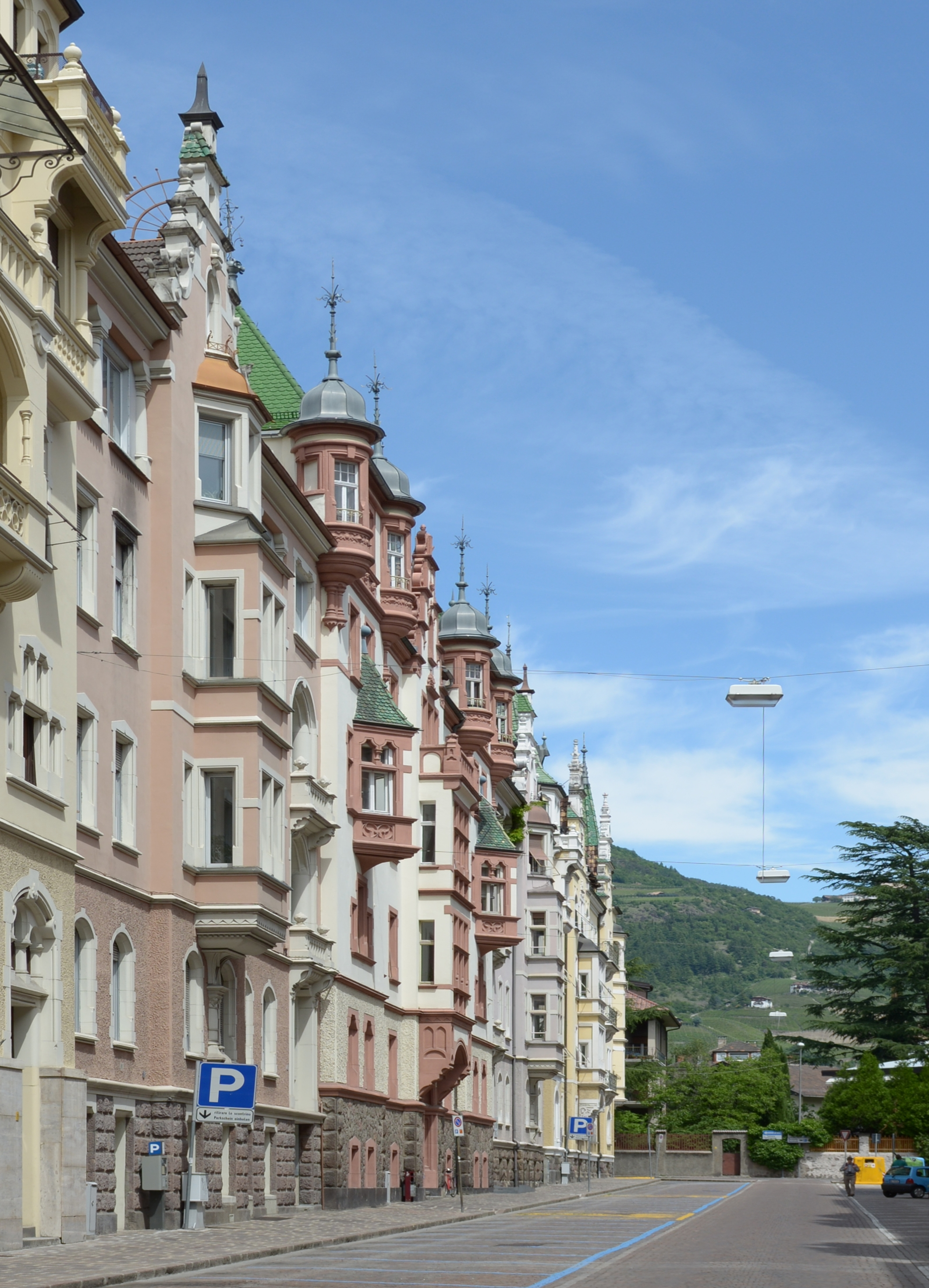
Via Cassa di Risparmio

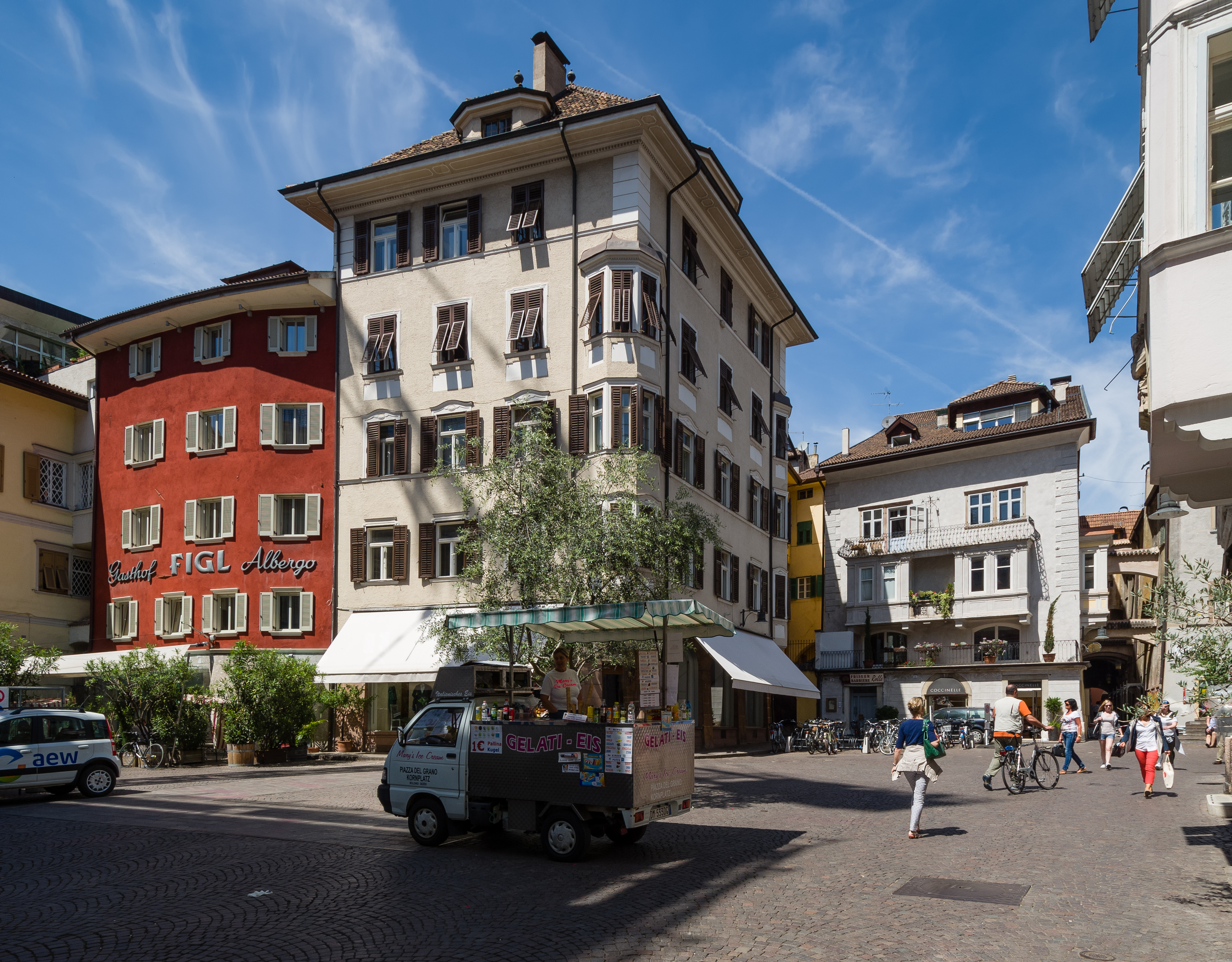
Piazza del Grano

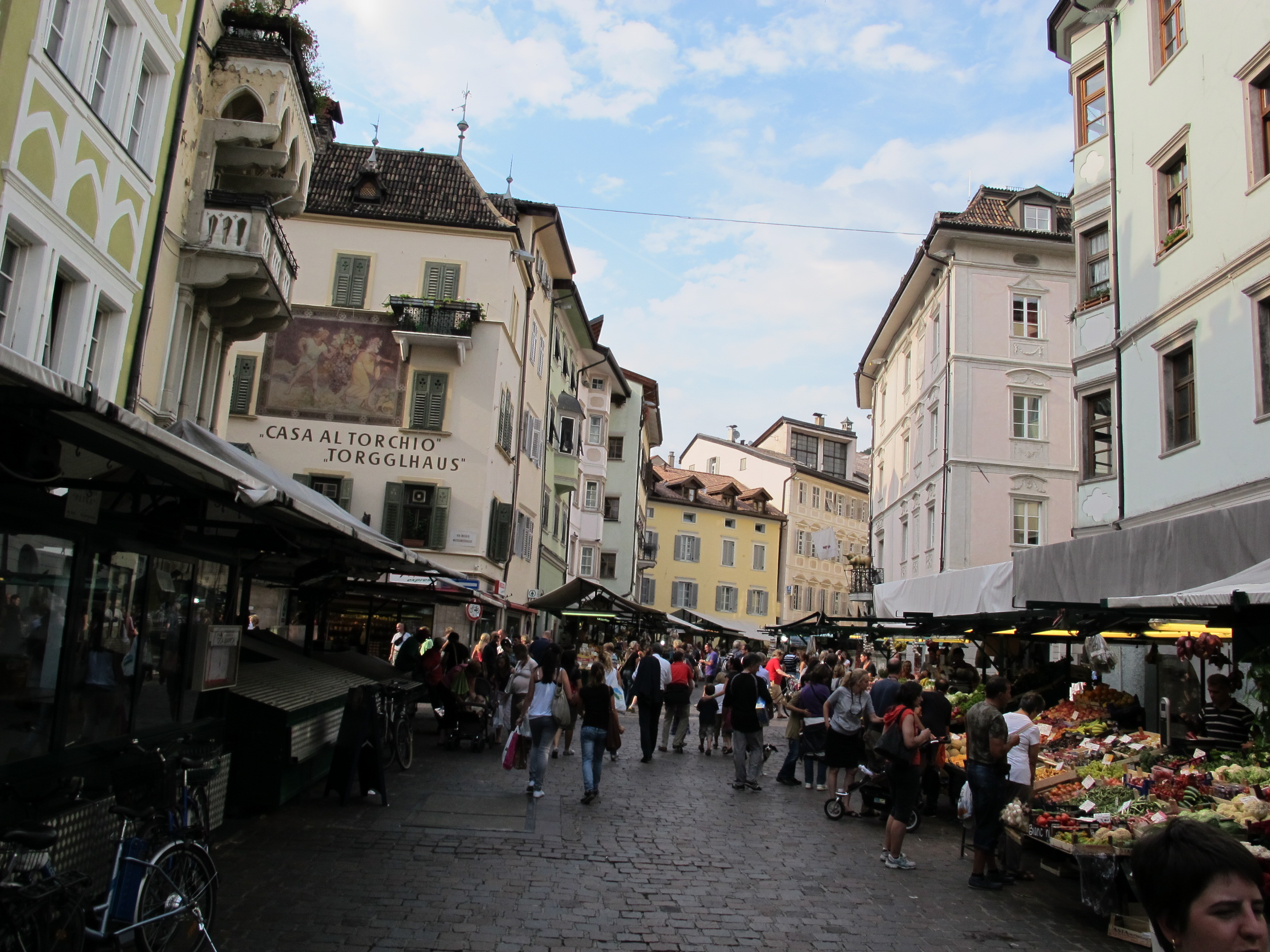
Piazza delle Erbe

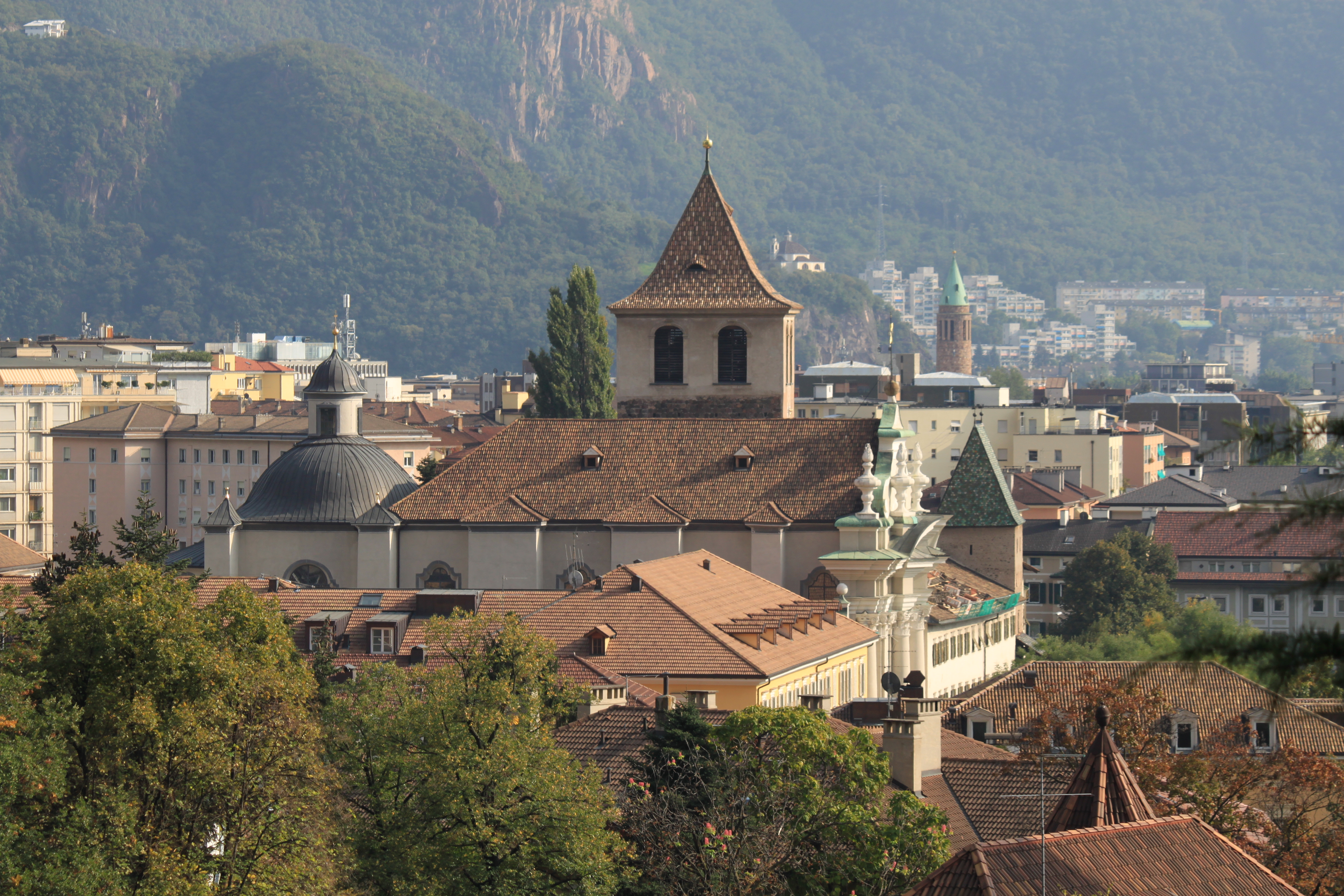
Muri-Gries Abbey

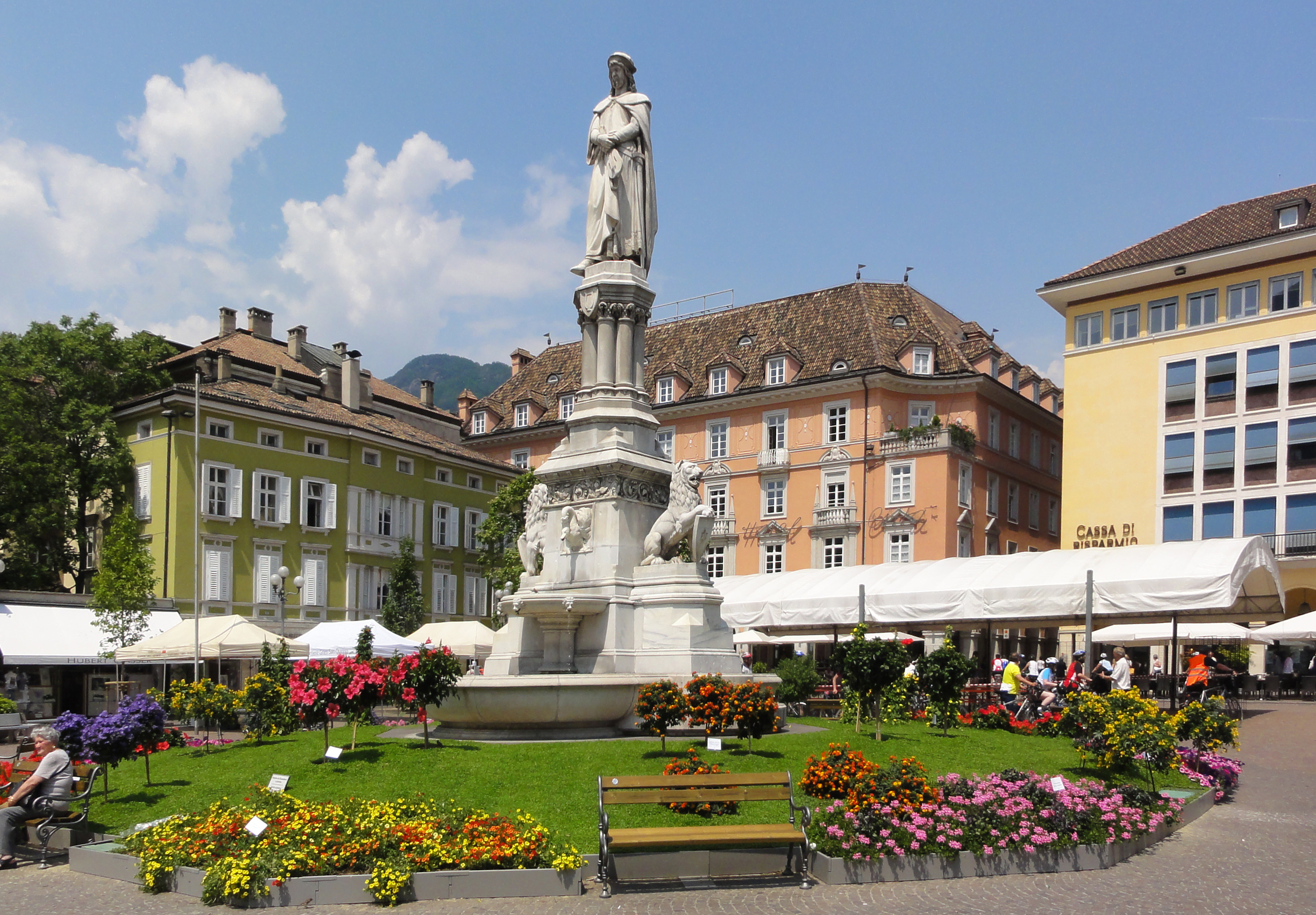
Statue of Walther von der Vogelweide

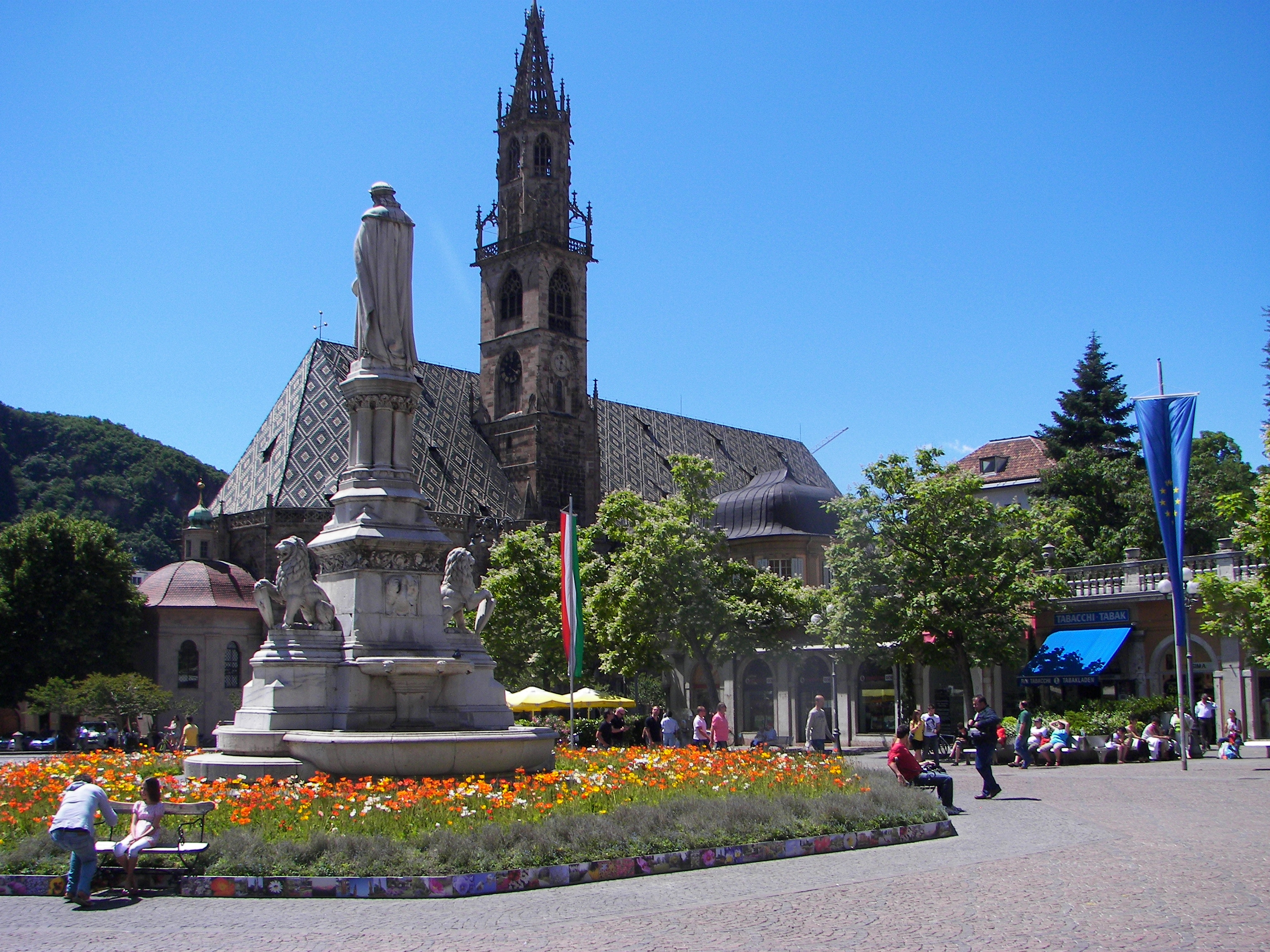
Bolzano Cathedral

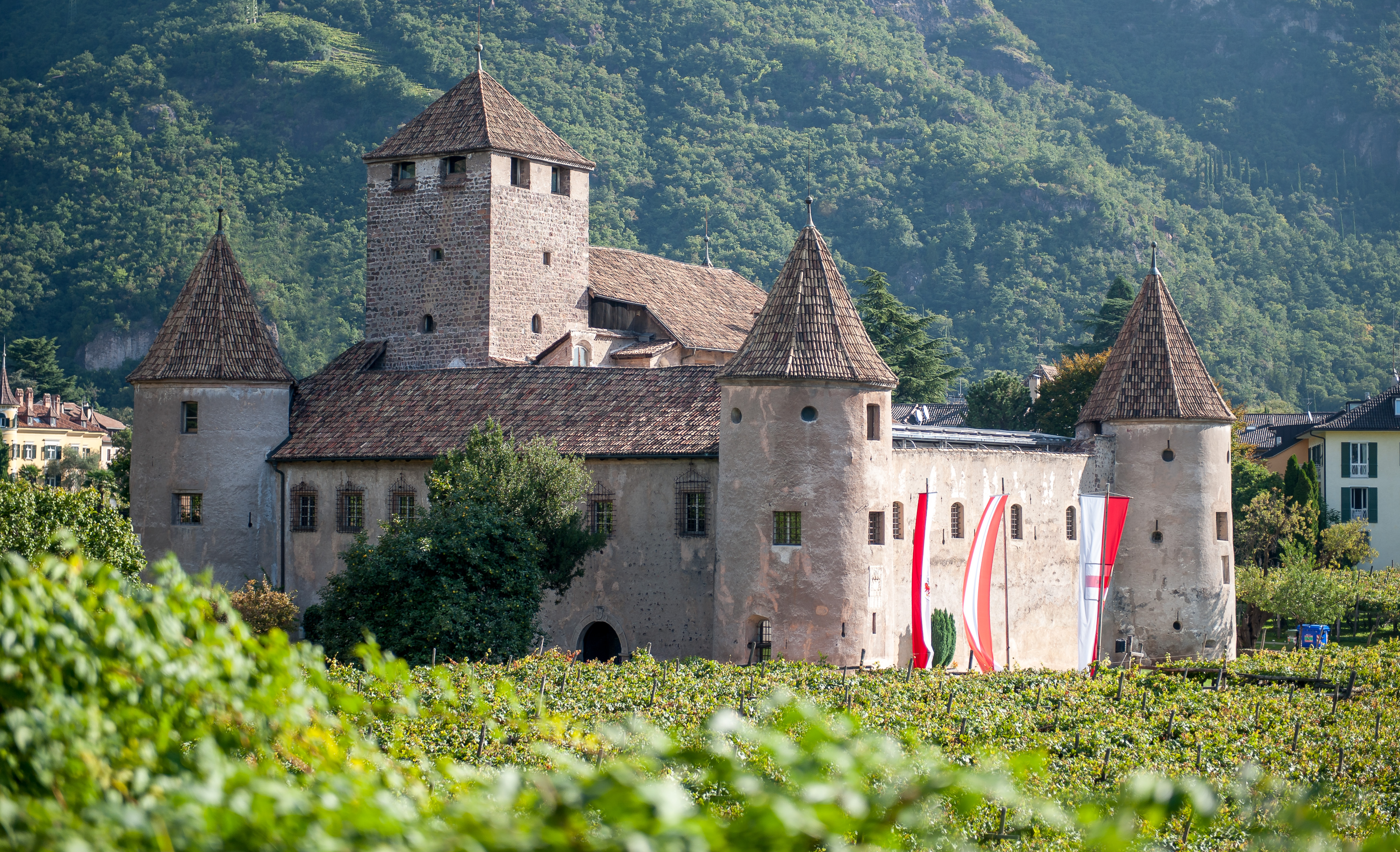
Castle Maretsch

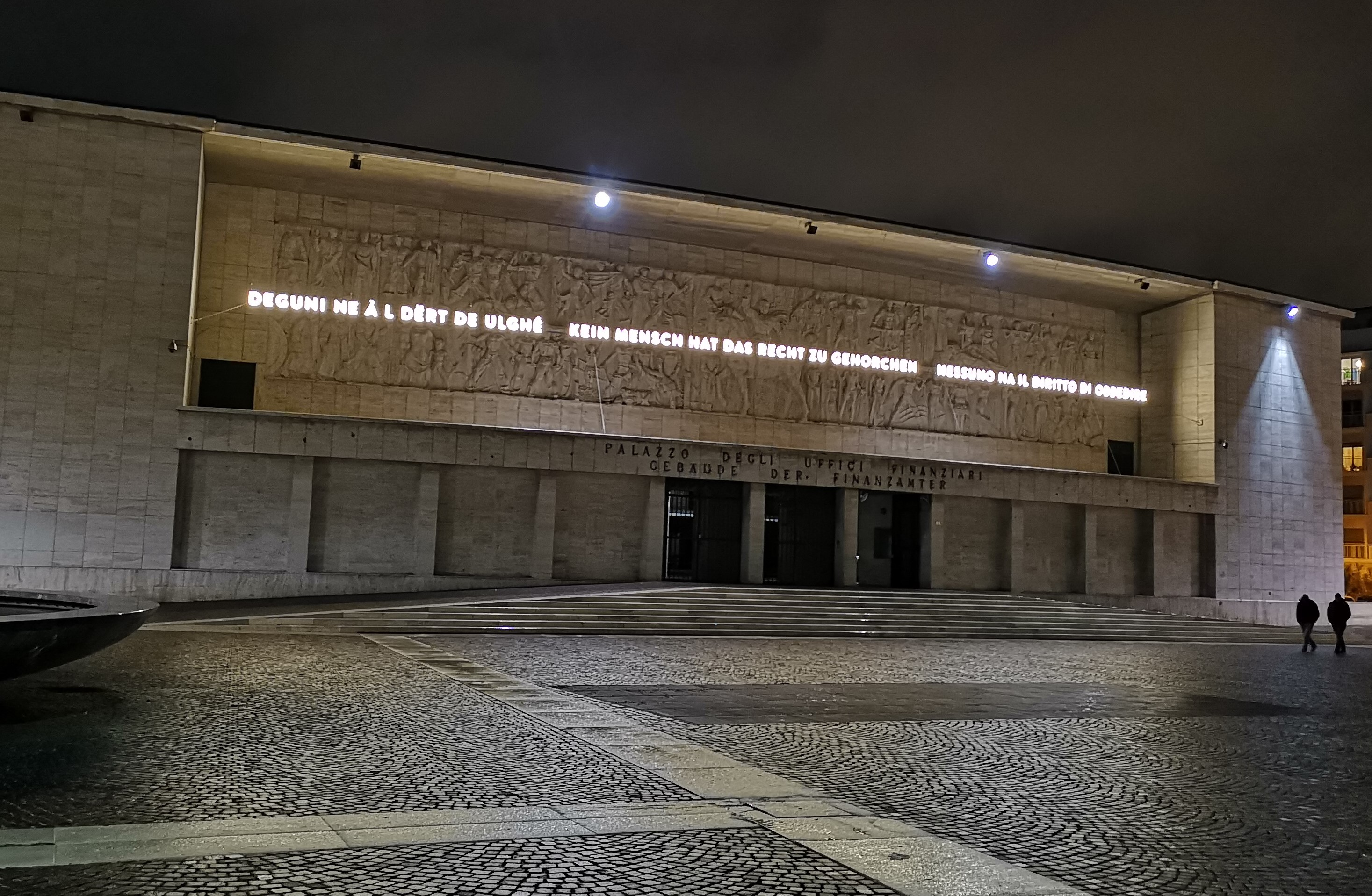
The former Casa del Fascio, now bearing a quotation from Hannah Arendt

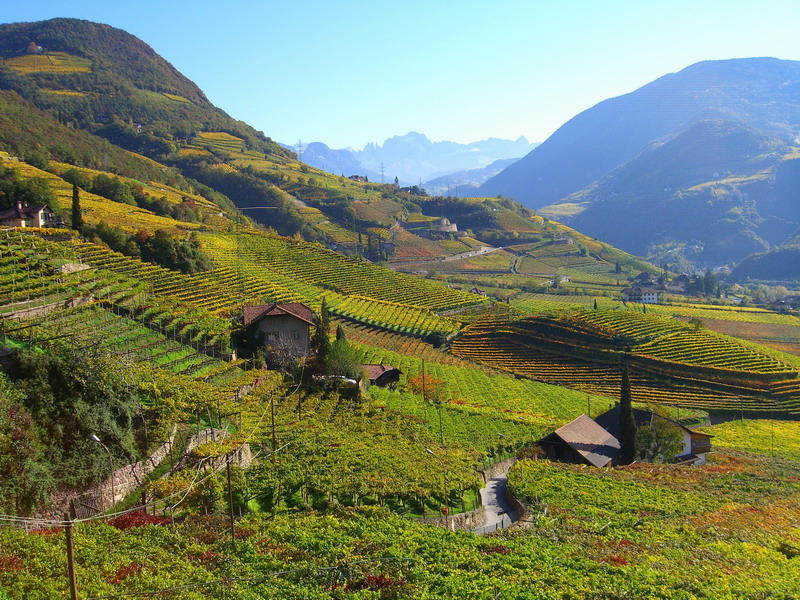
St. Magdalena with the Rosengarten group

The city centre has both Gothic and Romanesque style churches, as well as bilingual signage. Its landscape and cultural attractions make it a popular destination for tourists.

Among the major monuments and sights are:

- the Walther Square, with a statue of Walther von der Vogelweide, a German minstrel (minnesinger)
- the Via dei Portici or Laubengasse, a street 300 metres (980 ft) long, in the city centre with medieval arcades along its entire course, now housing countless high-street shops
- the Gothic Cathedral, started in 1184, expanded in the 1300s by architects Martin and Peter Schiche and completed in the early 16th century by Hans Lutz von Schussenried
- the Casa della pesa or Waaghaus at the central Piazza del Grano (Kornplatz), the former site of the public weighbridge
- the Old Parish Church of Gries, with an altarpiece by Michael Pacher
- the benedictine monastery of Muri-Gries, with baroque paintings by Martin Knoller
- the Chiesa dei Domenicani or Dominikanerkirche (13th century), with a series of 14th-century Gothic paintings
- various castles, including Maretsch Castle, Runkelstein Castle and Firmian/Sigmundskron Castle
- Victory Monument triumphal arch built under Mussolini (1928); now put in context as part of an exhibition on the two dictatorships of Italian Fascism and German Nazism
- the former Casa del Fascio, another fascist-era monument preserved but recontextualized in 2017

== Culture ==
=== Museums ===
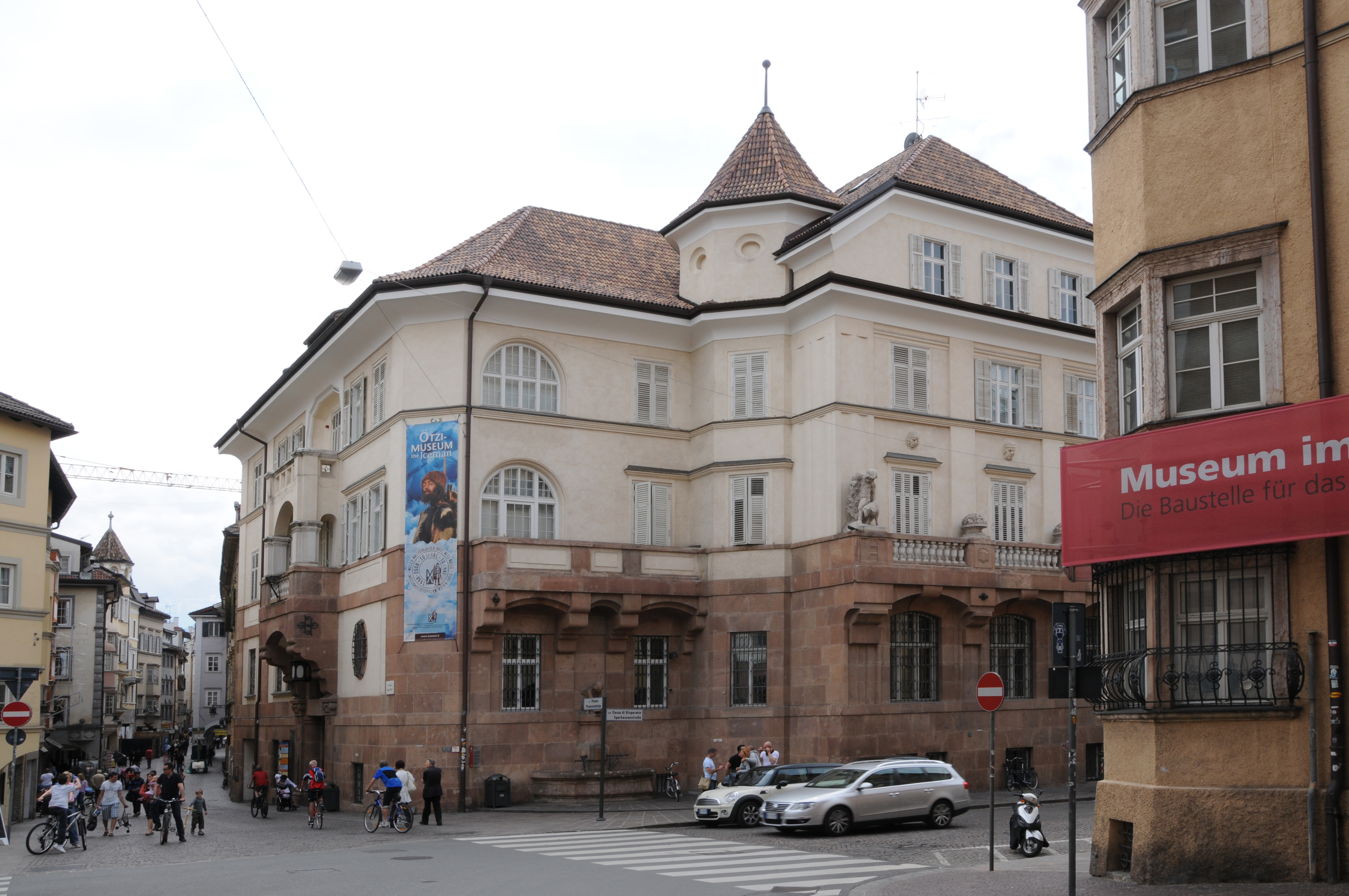
South Tyrol Museum of Archaeology

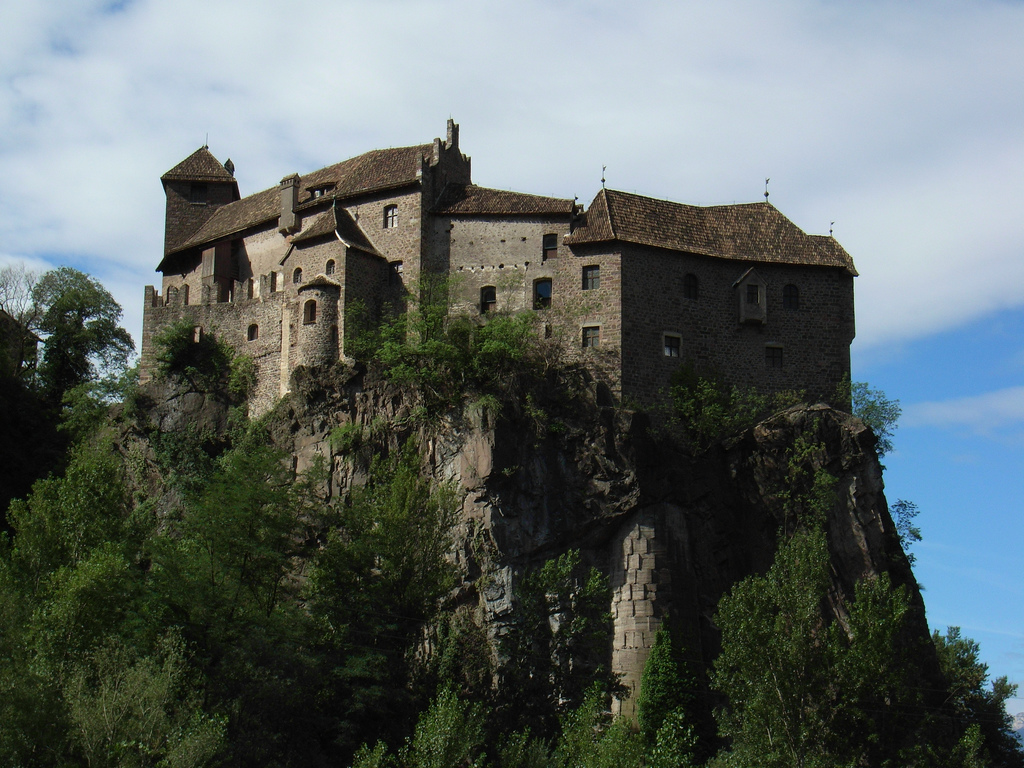
Runkelstein Castle

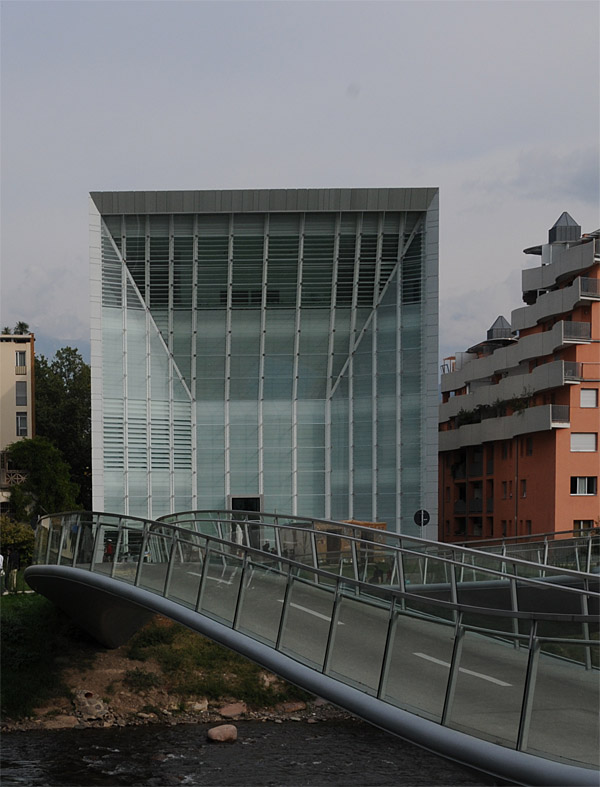
Museion

- South Tyrol Museum of Archaeology, is the exhibition location of the Ötzi mummy. The museum also exhibits other archaeological finds from the South Tyrolean region. Due to Ötzi, it is one of the leading archaeological museums in Italy.
- Runkelstein Castle was built in 1237 by the brothers Friedrich and Beral von Wangen. The castle became known for its extensive and profane fresco cycle from the Middle Ages.
- Bolzano City Museum; The collections of the museum include works of art such as paintings, sculptures, altars and folklore objects of daily life from all over South Tyrol. Access to the museum is limited, and only a part of the valuable collection is visible. The museum, built in 1905, is in the planning stage for an extension that would be fully accessible.
- Nature Museum South Tyrol is dedicated to areas such as geology, flora and fauna. The exhibition shows the emergence of South Tyrolean landscapes, for example the Dolomites, and natural science collections from the South Tyrolean region.
- Museion is a museum of Modern and Contemporary Art. The museum was founded in 1985 and, since 2008, has its headquarters on "Talferwiesen". The modern cube, including bridges, was planned by the architects' office "Krüger, Schubert, Vandreike (KSV)".
- Mercantile Museum of Bolzano, tells about the economic history of Bolzano and its importance in Central Europe as a bridge between North and South. The museum used to be the seat of the former Mercantile Magistrate. It also documents the trade fairs and their significance for the trading city.
- Bolzano School Museum, reports about the development of the school in South Tyrol since the introduction of the compulsory education of Empress Maria Theresa in the year 1774. Special features of this museum are, among other things, the presentation of the catacomb schools and the documentation about the Jewish school home near Merano.
- Bolzano Cathedral Treasury, Tesoro del Duomo di Bolzano or Domschatzkammer, was founded in 2007 and has its seat near the Cathedral of Bolzano. The museum shows sacred art such as church treasures, 18th-century paintings and goldsmithing.
- MMM Firmian is one of six locations of the museum project of mountaineer Reinhold Messner. The MMM Firmian is located at Sigmundskron Castle and is also the headquarters of the project. Themes of this museum are the history of mountaineering and the art of mountaineering. It shows the connection between the people and the mountains. Additionally, Reinhold Messner's experiences, collections and memories of the expeditions will be exhibited.
- Semi-rural House, was one of many houses built in the Semi-rural zone during the 1930s for industrial workers. It documents the development of this district at that time until the 1980s.
- Documentation Center "BZ '18–'45: one monument, one city, two dictatorships", Victory Monument. The museum is located below the Victory Monument and documents the time of the population of Bolzano and South Tyrol during the Italian fascism and after 1943 the German National Socialism. It is the first museum in Italy to work on fascism under Benito Mussolini. In 2016, the Museum received considerable recognition from the jury of the European Museum of the Year Award for exhibiting this sensitive topic.
- Pons Drusi Museum, located in the retirement home "Grieserhof" and showing archaeological remains such as frescoes and vases from Roman antiquity. The remaining walls indicate a former temple complex and a building with a pillared hall. Several objects from the first century AD were found, showing the life of the Romans in Gries-Bolzano at that time.

=== Libraries and archives ===
- Tessmann Library
- University Library of Bozen-Bolzano
- South Tyrolean Provincial Archives
- Civic Archives in Bozen-Bolzano

=== Cinema and theatre ===
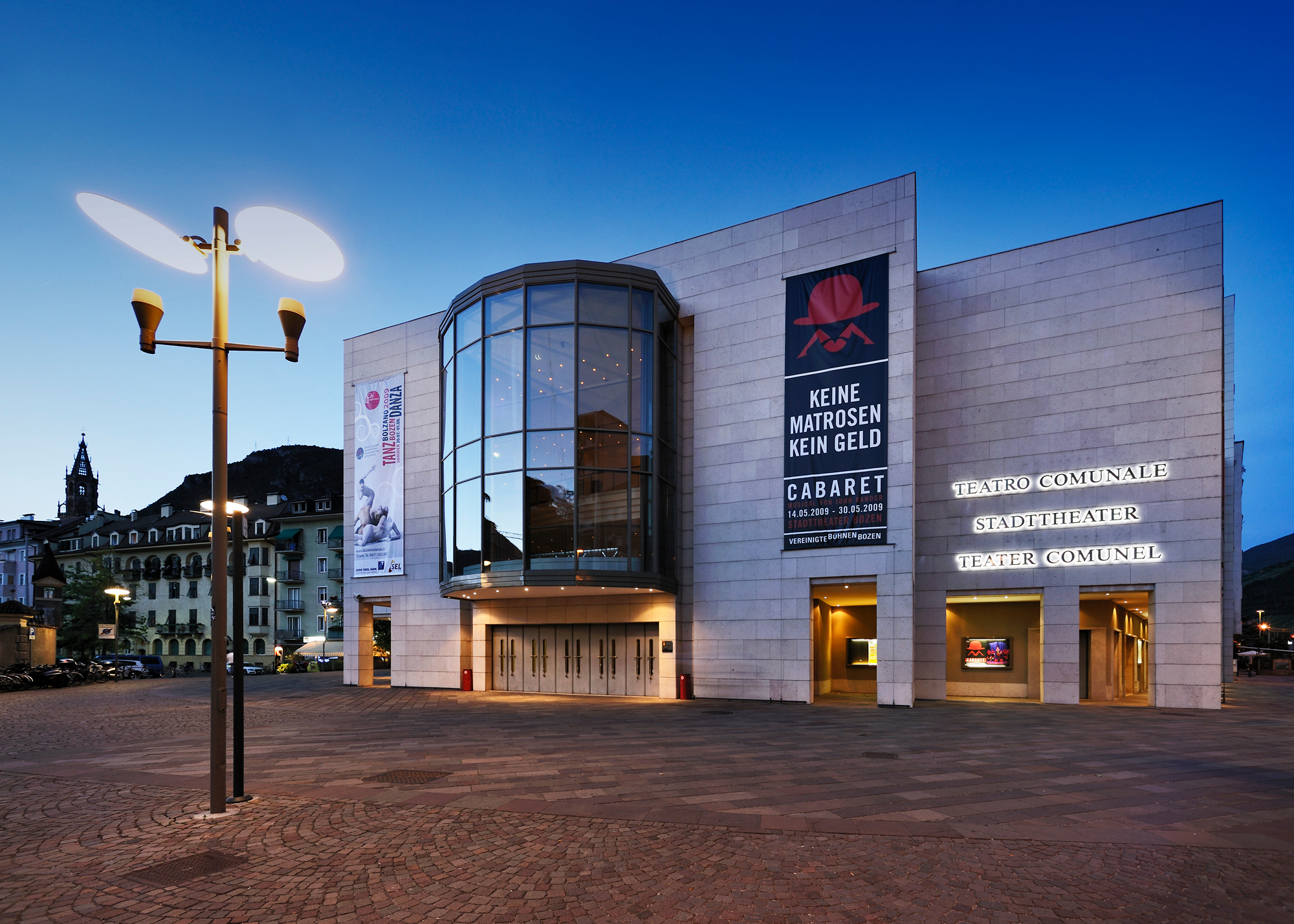
New theater Bolzano

- Bolzano Civic Theatre - Stadttheater Bozen; the new city theatre was opened in 1999 according to the plans of the architect Marco Zanuso. For a long time, the city had no city theatre because the old one was destroyed in World War II. It is the seat of the United Stages Bolzano (VBB) and has two halls. The theatre features performances in Italian and German.
- Concert Hall Bolzano was also opened in 1999 and is the seat of the Haydn Orchestra of Bolzano and Trento. Every two years, the famous Ferruccio Busoni International Piano Competition is held in the auditorium.
- Casa della Cultura/Haus der Kultur Walther von der Vogelweide (Culture house Walther von der Vogelweide), is a theater that presents a majority of performances in German. It is located in the centre of the city and can accommodate about 500 people.
- Teatro Cristallo is located outside the centre in Via Dalmazia. Most of the performances are presented in Italian.
- Teatro Comunale di Gries or Stadttheater Gries (City theatre Gries), located in the district of Gries-San Quirino and can accommodate 371 people. Performances are presented in German and Italian.
- Cortile or Theatre im Hof (Theatre in the courtyard) is located on Piazza delle Erbe and dedicated to the children and youth theatre. An additional focus of the small theatre is the topic of "women in and at the theatre".
- Carambolage; in this venue improvisational theater and other forms of cabaret are offered. It is located in the centre of the city.
- Batzen Sudwerk; below the 600-year-old brewery in the basement is a cultural workshop. Performances are often in the form of cabaret.
- Teatro Cinema Rainerum; at the Rainerum Institute in the Don Bosco district, there is a theatre for about 400 people.
- Filmclub Bolzano (Movie club Bolzano), is a cinema with 3 rooms that also shows several films of regional directors and actors. The Filmclub is also the venue of the Bolzano Filmfestival. The cinema is located in the old town of Bolzano.
- Cineplexx was opened in 2009 and it offers a majority of films in German. In addition to films in German and Italian, other films are also available in English. The cinema has 7 rooms.
- UCI Cinemas, opened in 2015 and located in the shopping centre "Twenty". Most of the 6 halls offer films in Italian. In this cinema, films are occasionally shown in English and German.

=== Cultural events ===
Bolzano organizes the following events every year:

- Südtirol JazzFestival, is a festival that not only takes place in Bolzano but is also performed all over South Tyrol. The jazz festival lasts up to 10 days and performs 90 concerts in 50 different locations with over 150 jazz musicians. International jazz musicians such as Don Cherry, Randy Brecker, Carla Bley, Chick Corea, Pat Metheny, and Collin Walcott participated in this event.
- Ferruccio Busoni International Piano Competition, is an international piano competition that is held every 2 years. This competition was initiated by the director of the Conservatory of Music "Claudio Monteverdi" in memory of the 25th anniversary of the death of Ferruccio Busoni. The artist influenced Italian and German music art and was therefore a symbol of the South Tyrolean culture.
- Bolzano Filmfestival Bozen; The first Bolzano film festival was held in 1987 under the name "Bozner Filmtage". It serves as a platform for the local film scene and creates contact between filmmakers and audiences. Films in Italian and German are shown. Artists like Tobias Moretti, Fred Zinnemann, Herbert Achternbusch, Michele Placido, and Jiří Menzel participated in this event.
- Bolzano Festival, is a festival that takes place every summer and offers classical music. The European Union Youth Orchestra, the Gustav Mahler Jugendorchester and the participants of the Ferruccio Busoni Competition are performing regularly.
- Bolzano Danza - Tanz Bozen, is an international contemporary dance festival and is held every summer. It is a festival that shows different dance performances in different places of the city. It is organized by the Haydn Foundation of Bolzano and Trento.
- Christmas market: The Bolzano Christmas Market was founded in 1990 as Italy's first Christmas market. The stands are located in different places of the old town. With over 1.2 million visitors (2005), the Bolzano Christmas Market is the most visited in Italy.
- Bolzano ShortFilmFestival, also collaborates with the Bolzano Filmfestival and awards prizes for the best short films without words ("No Words"). Independently of the Bolzano Filmfestival it also awards prizes for the best Italian short film. The festival was held in 1968 for the first time.

== Economy ==
The city thrives on a mix of old and new high-quality intensive agriculture (including wine, fruit, and dairy products), tourism, traditional handicraft (wood, ceramics), and advanced services. Heavy industry (machinery, automotive, and steel) installed during the 1930s has now been mostly dismantled. The local economy is very dependent on the public sector and especially the provincial government.

Bolzano is the biggest city in South Tyrol, which is an autonomous province in Northern Italy with a special statute. This statute preserves the rights of the German-speaking minority in Italy. This unique system was admired by the Dalai Lama, who visited the city on several occasions to study a possible application in Tibet. It has also been presented as role model for the successful and fair resolution of inter-ethnic conflict to other regions of the world.

=== Exhibition Bolzano ===
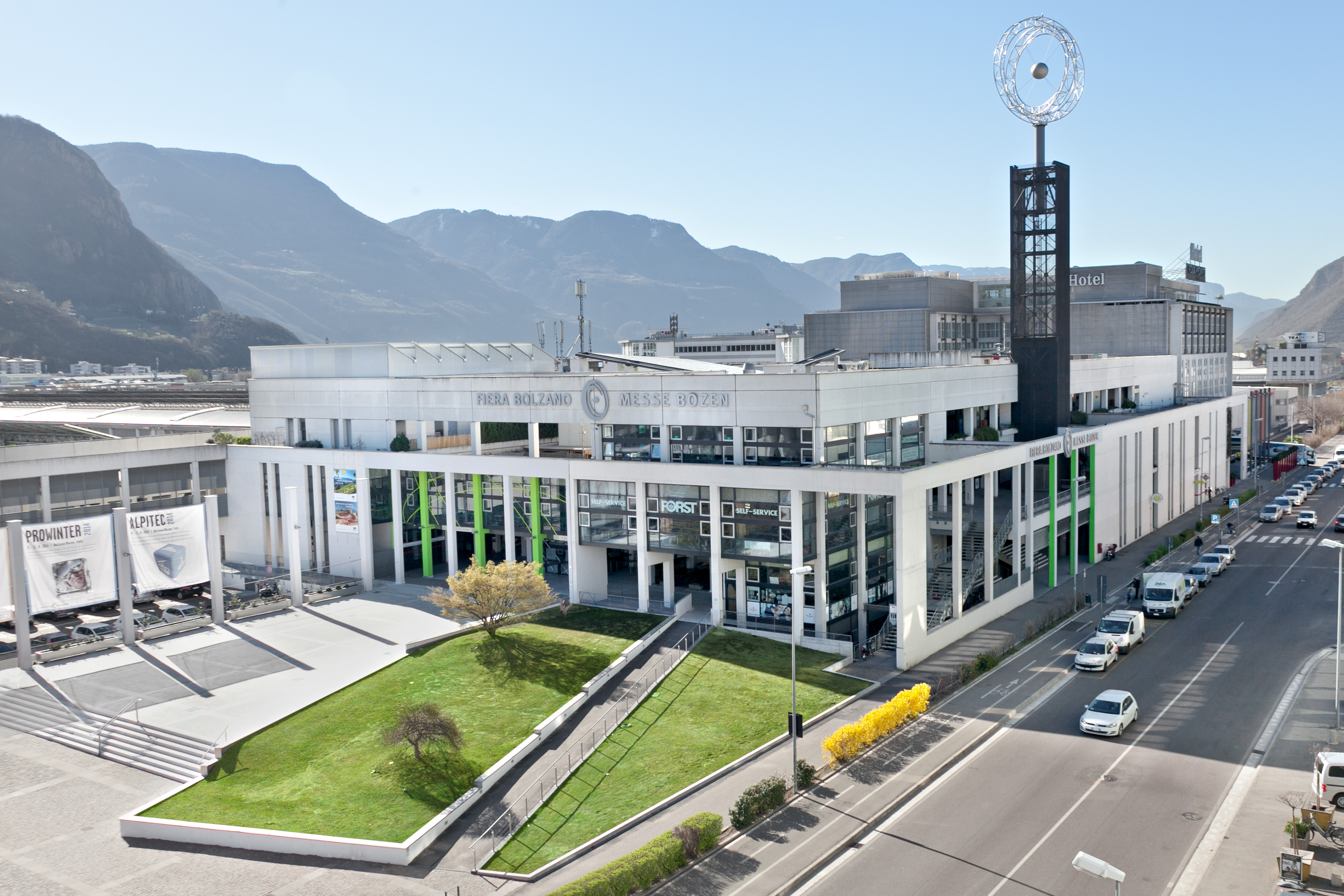
Exhibition Centre

The tradeshows and conferences of Exhibition Bolzano are concentrated on topics relating to the economies of Alpine countries. There is thus a great focus on trade show subjects in the economic competence of South Tyrol and Trentino. The main focuses of dining and leisure time, sports, agriculture and specific Alpine industries attract an annual total of over 3000 exhibitors and over 230000 visitors from all over Europe.

=== Italian German Business Forum Bozen-Bolzano ===
Since 2011, the city hosts the Italo-Germanic Business Forum, which brings together the leaders of the Italian and German economies – General Confederation of Italian Industry (Confindustria) and the Federation of German Industries – in the Mercantile Palace to address issues related to the international crisis.

=== Companies ===
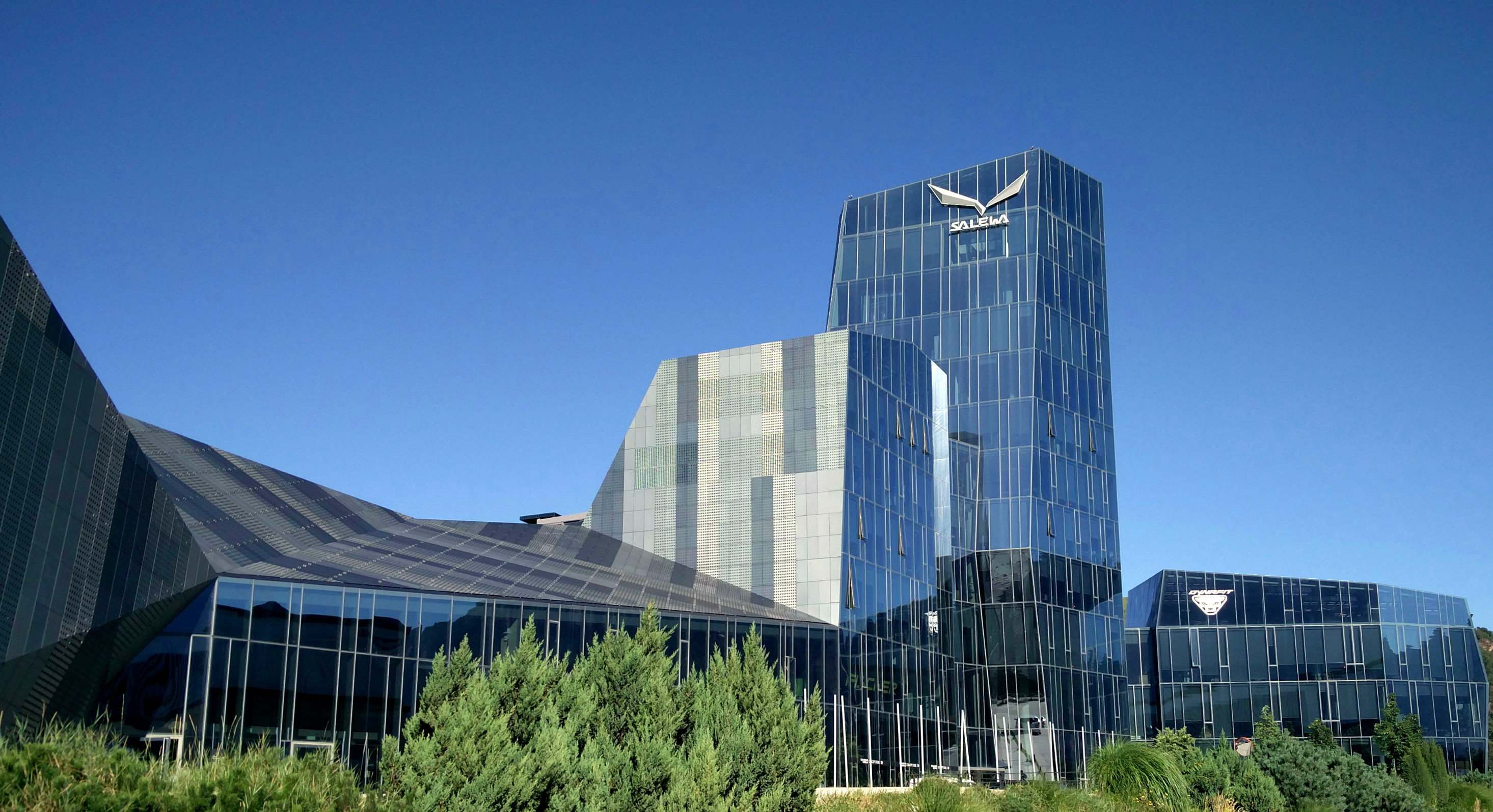
Oberalp Headquarters

Large companies in Bolzano are:

- Thun S.p.A. SB (AG)
- Fercam S.p.A. (AG)
- Spar (retailer) Italia S.p.A.
- Acciaierie Valbruna S.p.A.
- Iveco S.p.A.
- Oberalp AG
- Alperia S.p.A. (AG)

=== Research centers ===
==== NOI Techpark ====
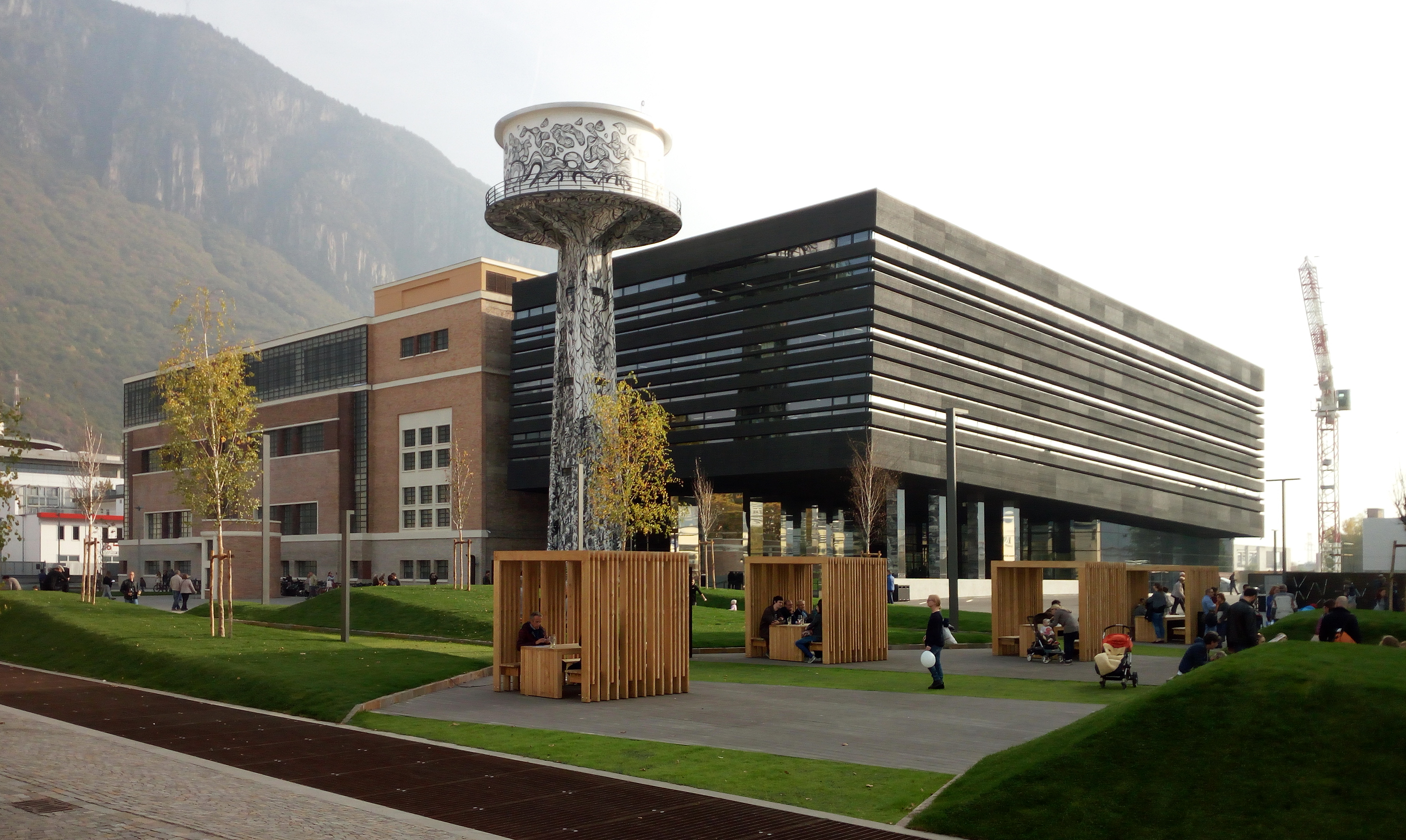
NOI Techpark

NOI Techpark is on a 12-hectare (30-acre) site in the south of Bolzano, on premises formerly home to aluminium works. The "Nature of Innovation" concept contains innovation imitating nature. The concept that NOI Techpark is based on has research institutes, companies and start-ups from South Tyrol and all over the globe working together to prepare the ground for sustainable development.

Working with representatives from South Tyrol's business and research communities, BLS and TIS innovation park have developed the park's "Nature of Innovation" positioning title, the initials of which give the park its name: NOI. The name reflects two meanings in South Tyrol: depending on how you want to pronounce it, NOI can either sound like the Italian word for "we" or the South Tyrolean dialect word for "new". A special focus lies on those fields:

- Alpine Technology
- Renewable Energies and Energy Efficiency
- Food Technology
- ICT & Automation

==== Free University of Bolzano-Bozen ====
The Free University of Bolzano-Bozen, founded in October 1997, is actively involved in basic and applied research projects through its five faculties, of which four are located in Bolzano. The university is engaged in a multitude of scientific and technological areas, in addition to different disciplines belonging to Humanities.

==== Eurac Research ====
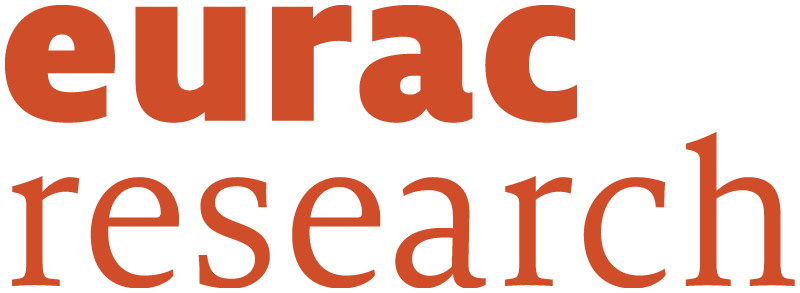
The Eurac Research logo

Eurac Research is a private research centre headquartered in Bolzano. The research facility was founded in 1992 and initially had 12 employees. Meanwhile, the centre has more than 700 employees. The topics of this institution include, for example, "Liveable Regions", "Diversity as Added Value" and "Healthy Society". The research has focused more on the Alpine region. Since 2002, the site has been located on Drusus Street, in the former fascist "GIL" building, which was then extensively renovated and integrated with modern buildings. In 2018, the research facility will lead the terraXcube in the NOI Techpark Bolzano. The terraXcube is a research infrastructure that can simulate the most extreme climatic conditions on Earth. Air pressure, humidity and solar radiation can be simulated and changed simultaneously in one room. The aim is to investigate how humans react to extreme climatic conditions. Even machines can be tested in this simulator.

==== Fraunhofer Italia ====
Fraunhofer Italia is a subsidiary of Fraunhofer-Gesellschaft and is headquartered in Bolzano. The company was founded in 2009 and since then specializes in areas such as "Automation and Mechatronic Engineering" and "Process Engineering in Construction". The Organization for Applied Research seeks to help small and medium-sized enterprises in the region through charitable research. Since 2017, the research facility has been based in the Technology Park in Bolzano South.

== Education ==
=== Free University of Bozen-Bolzano ===
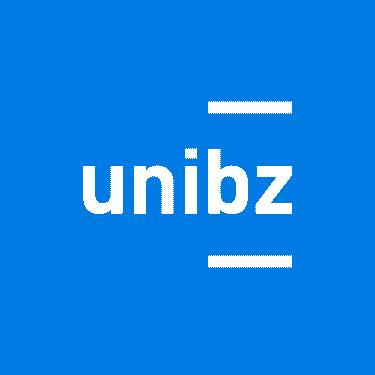
Logo of the university

The Free University of Bozen-Bolzano was founded in 1997 and has its headquarters in the city of Bolzano. It offers trilingual courses in German, Italian and English. The unibz was the first trilingual university in Europe. Other university locations are in Brixen and Bruneck. Through the Tyrol–South Tyrol–Trentino Euroregion, the university also works closely together with the universities of Innsbruck and Trento. The University of Bolzano has the following five faculties:

- Economics
- Computer science
- Design and arts
- Science and technology
- Education

=== State College of Health Professions "Claudiana" ===
The State College of Health Professions "Claudiana" was founded in 1993 and has its headquarters next to the regional hospital of Bolzano outside the centre since 2006. The college was named after the Regent of the Austrian County of Tyrol, Claudia de Medici. The college serves to train health professionals, such as nurses, midwives, technical medicine and rehabilitation specialists. Teaching is in Italian and German.

=== Conservatory "Claudio Monteverdi" ===
The conservatory "Claudio Monteverdi" is a college of music in Bolzano. The conservatory was founded in 1927 and has since been named after the former Italian composer Claudio Monteverdi. The rooms of the conservatory are located in the Dominican monastery. The Academy of Music gained international recognition through the biennial Ferruccio Busoni International Piano Competition.

== Transport ==
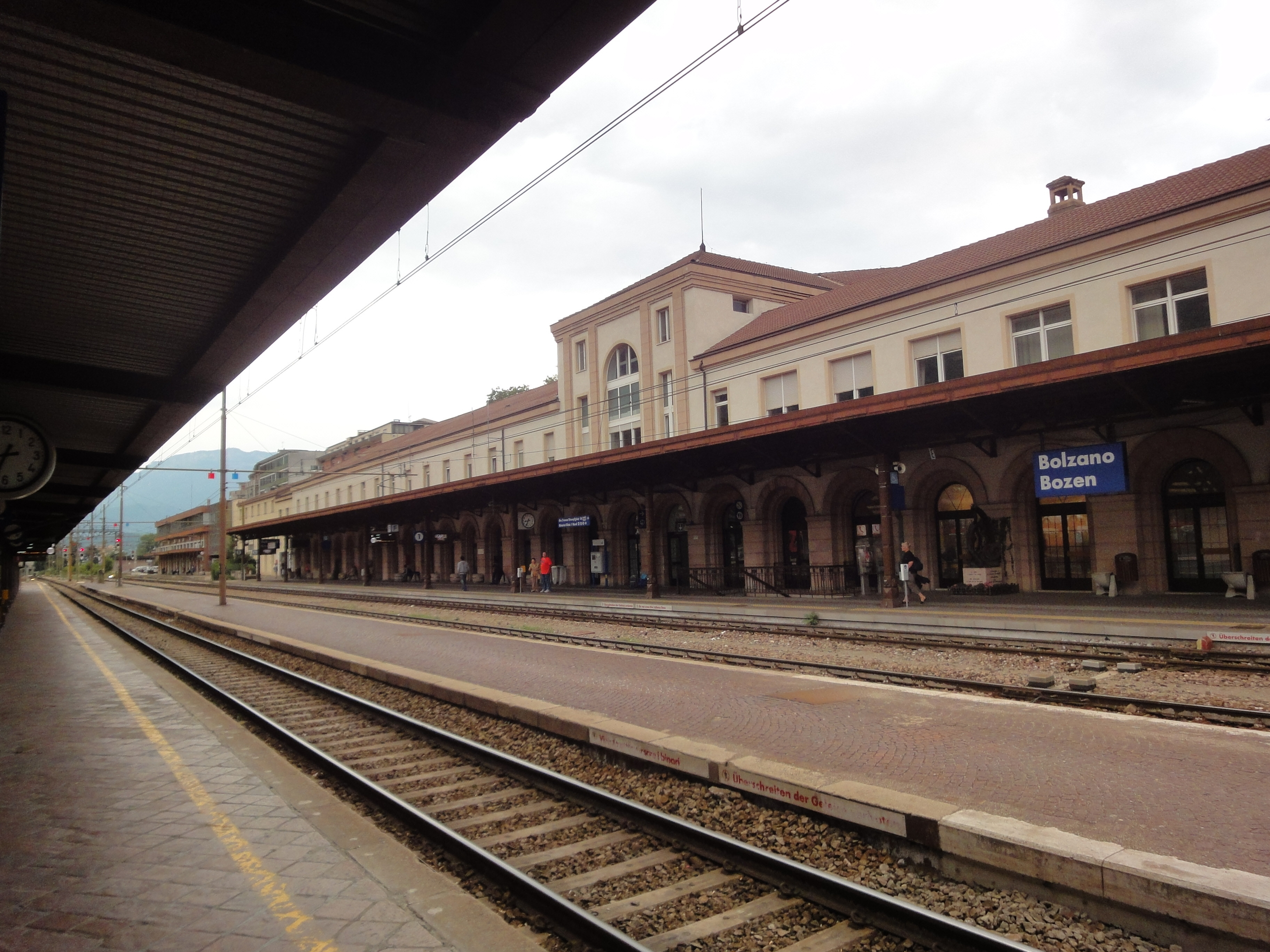
Bolzano railway station

Bolzano is connected to the motorway network A22-E45 to Trento and Verona and to Innsbruck (Austria) and Munich (Germany). In Bolzano South, there is a transport hub that connects the dual carriageway MeBo with the A22 motorway. The dual carriageway MeBo (Merano - Bolzano) was completed in 1997 to quickly connect the two metropolitan areas of South Tyrol, Merano and Bolzano, and to relieve the surrounding communities in the district of Burggrafenamt and the old former two-lane State street SS38 (Strada statale 38).

The city is also connected to the Italian railway system. Bolzano railway station, opened in 1859, forms part of the Brenner Railway (Verona–Innsbruck), which is part of the main railway route between Italy and Germany. The station is also a junction of two branch lines, to Merano and Mals. The station of Bolzano is served by Frecciarossa and Frecciargento trains of Trenitalia, Italo EVO of Italo Nuovo Trasporto Viaggiatori (from August 2018) and EuroCity trains of Austrian Federal Railways.

A two-line light rail network is planned to serve Bolzano, at a length of 7.2 km (4 1/2 miles) with 17 stops, with a projected cost of €192 million.

There is a 50-kilometre (30 mi) network of cycle paths, and about 30% of journeys in Bolzano are made by bicycle.

Until summer 2015 there was a regular connection between Bolzano Airport (IATA: BZO) and Rome. In summer charter flights are offered to Cagliari, Olbia, Lamezia Terme and Catania.

Since 1966 a cable car connects the centre of Bolzano with Oberbozen-Soprabolzano and the community of Ritten. In 2009 the Italian manufacturer Leitner replaced the old cable car with a new modern 3S system. Although the so-called "Rittner Seilbahn" primarily serves the tourist market, it also provides an important transit link for the residents of Renon. The cable car system, which can carry up to 726 persons per hour, is the first tricable gondola lift in Italy.

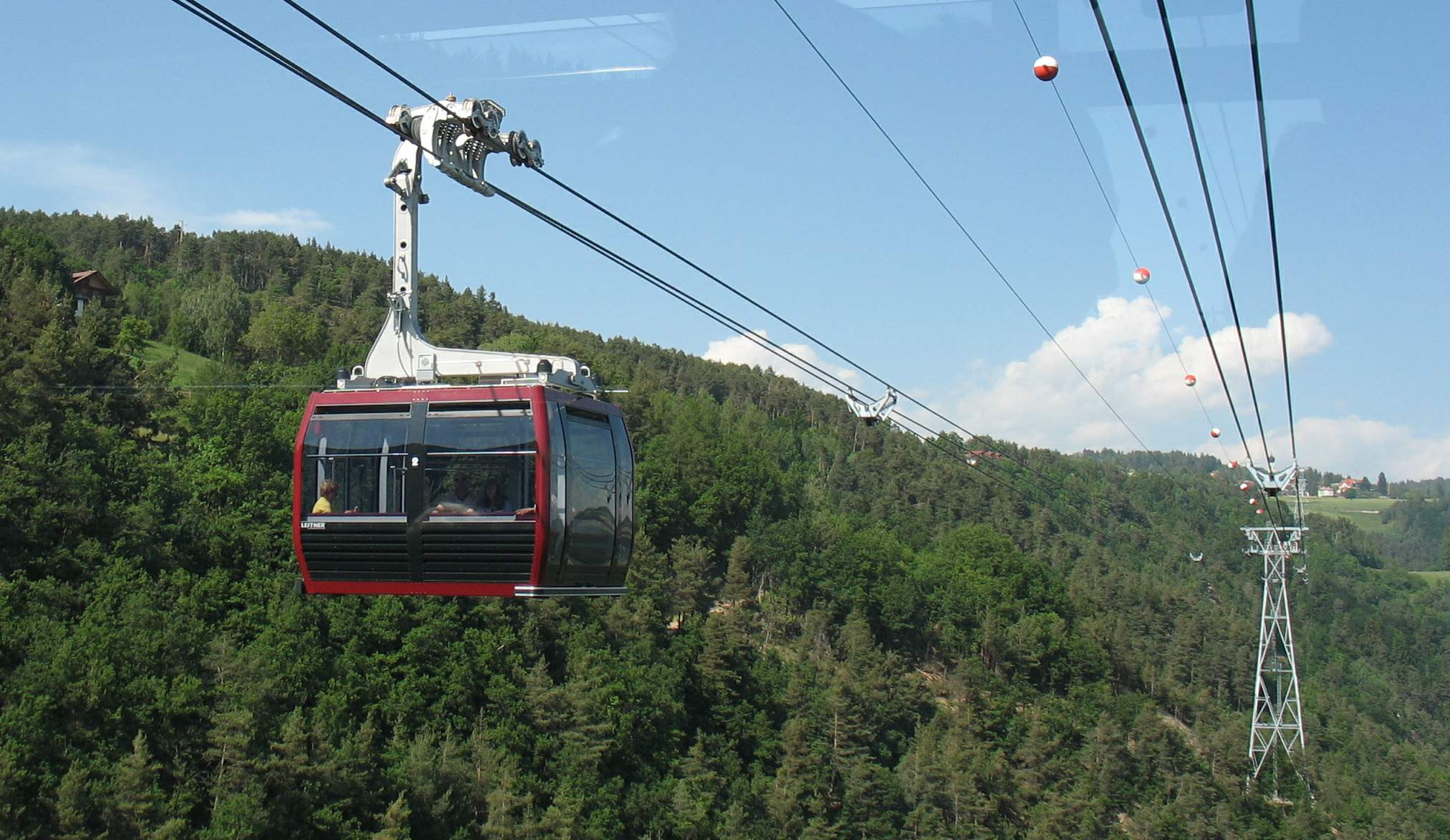
Cable car Ritten

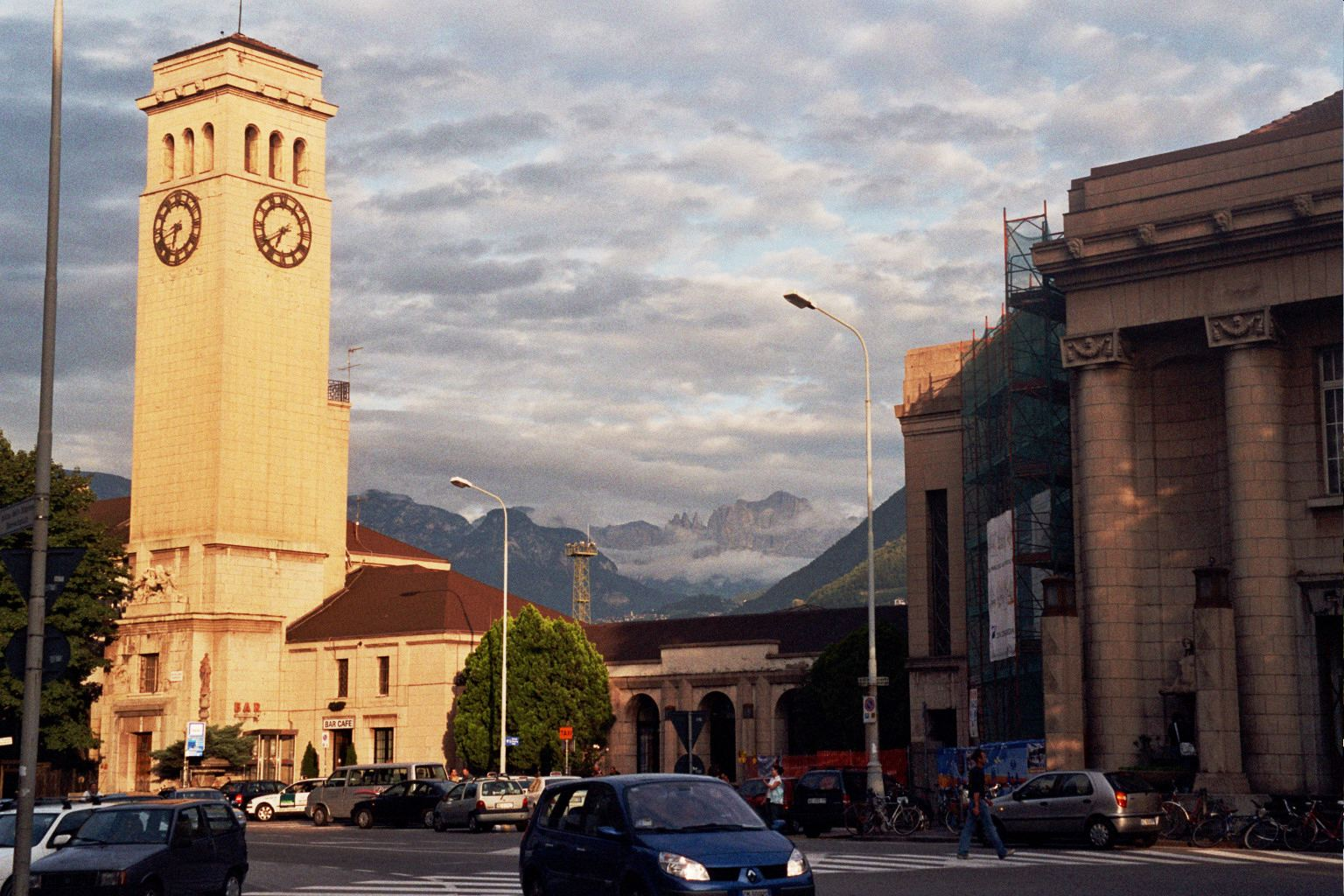
Bolzano railway station

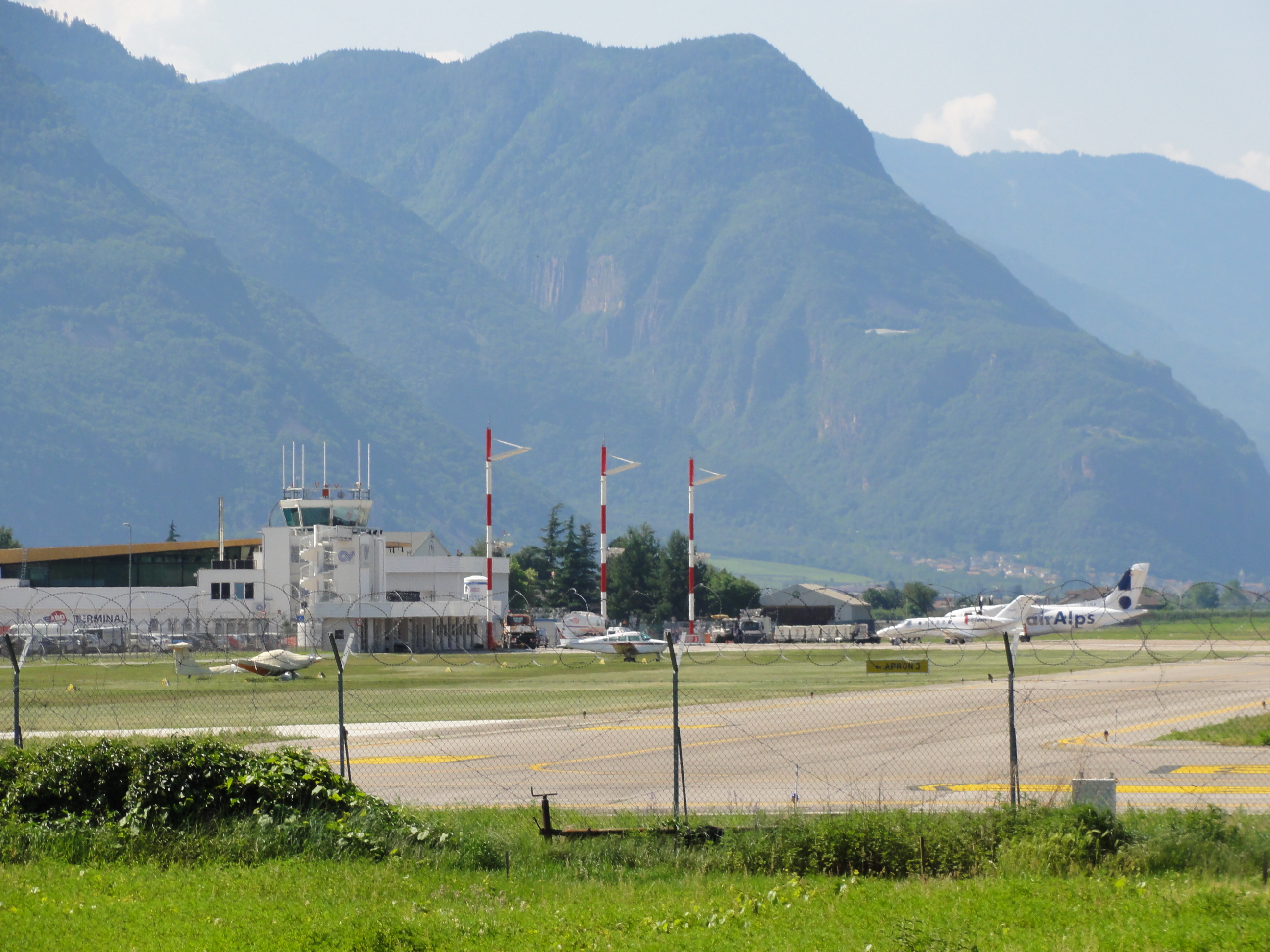
Bolzano Airport

== Sport ==
The town is host to an annual road running competition – the BOclassic – which features an elite men's 10K and women's 5K races. The event, first held in 1975, takes place on New Year's Eve and is broadcast live on television by Rai Sport Più.

Bolzano is also the host city of the Giro delle Dolomiti annual road bike event.

=== Local teams ===
Football

- FC Südtirol (Serie B)
- AC Virtus Bolzano (Eccellenza)
- Bozner F.C. (Eccellenza)
- Asd Oltrisarco (Prima Categoria)
- Haslacher SV (Seconda Categoria)
- F.C. Gries (Seconda Categoria)
- F.C. Neugries (Seconda Categoria)

Handball

- SSV Bozen Handball A-Elite Liga

Ice hockey

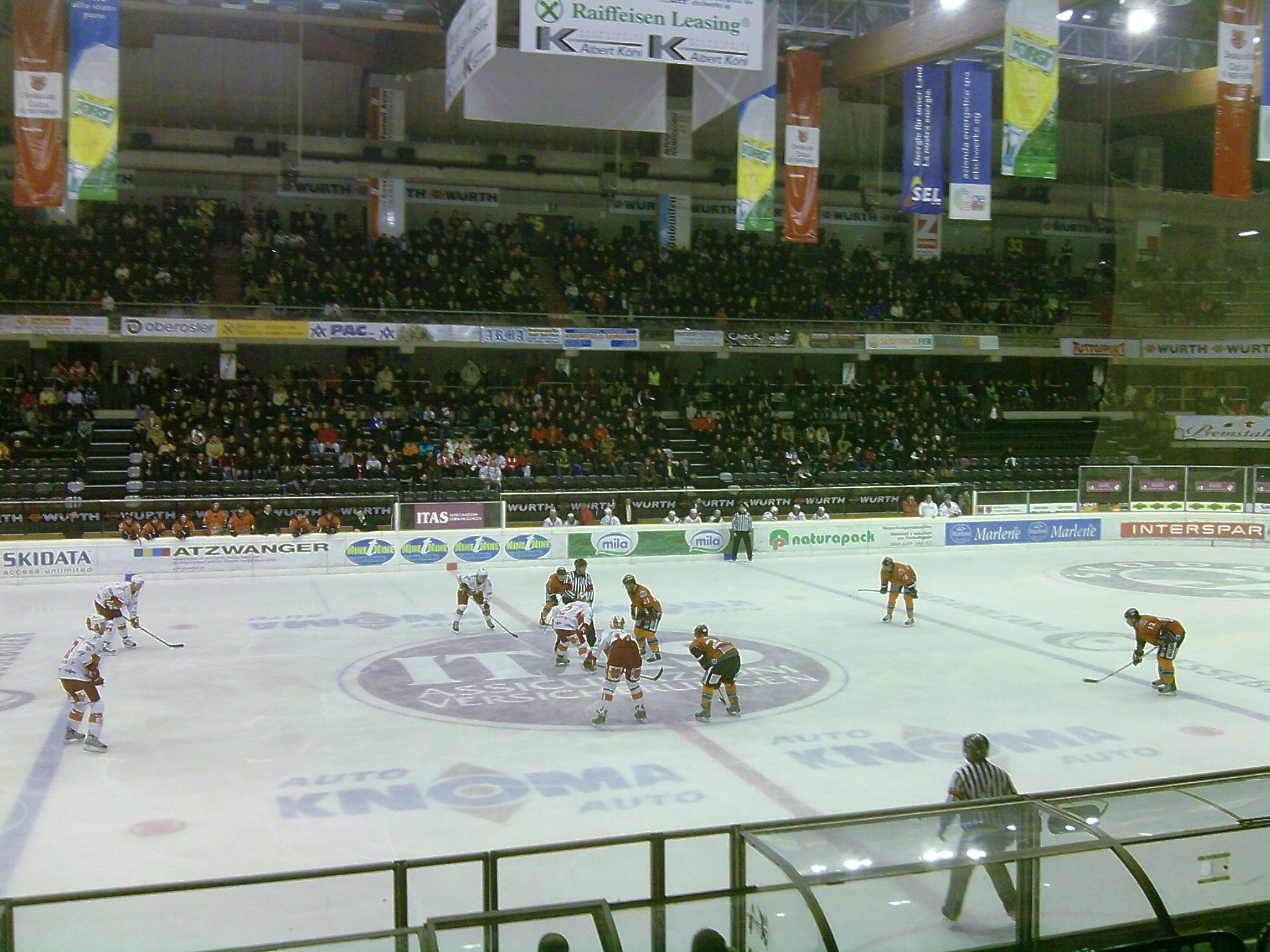
The Sparkasse Arena

- HC Bolzano Bozen Foxes play in the ICEHL, winning the title in 2014, their debut year and 2018.

Rugby

- Bolzano Rugby play in the Italian Serie C

Softball and baseball

- Adler
- Pool 77
- Softball Club Dolomiti

Fistball

- SSV Bozen plays in the FBL (Austrian Fistball League), the first Austrian league.

== Notable people ==
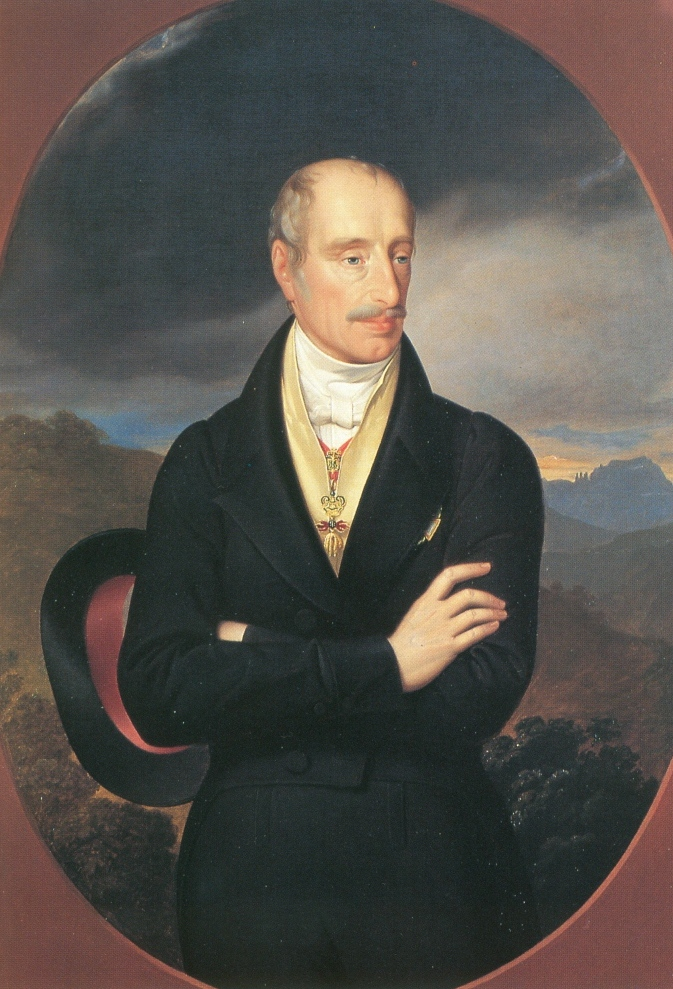
Rainer Joseph of Austria

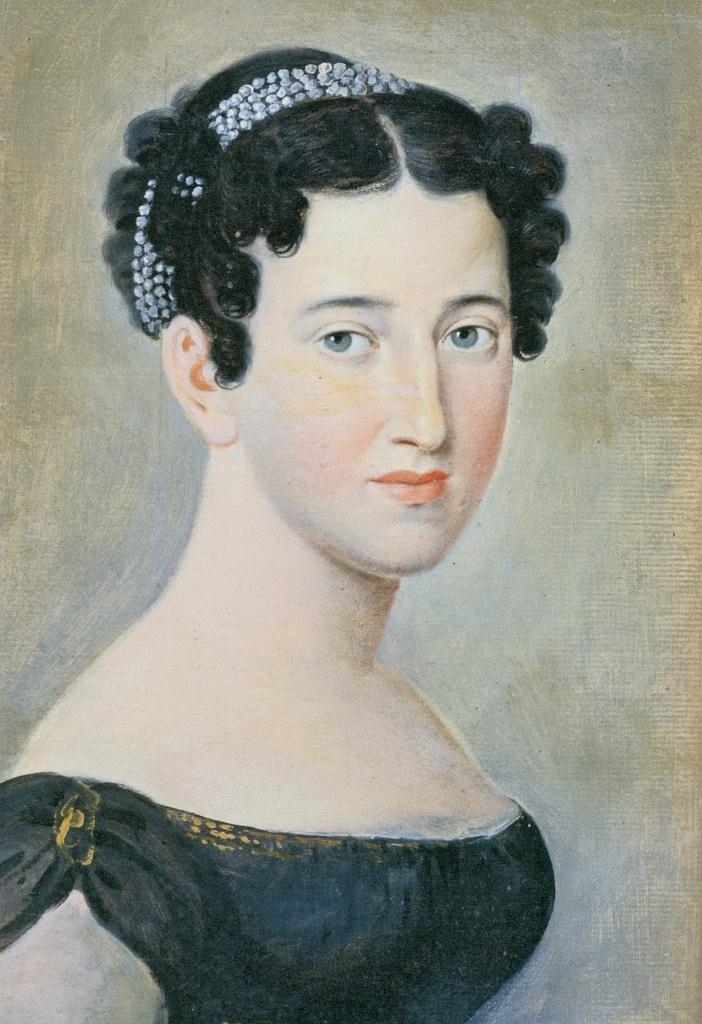
Annette of Menz

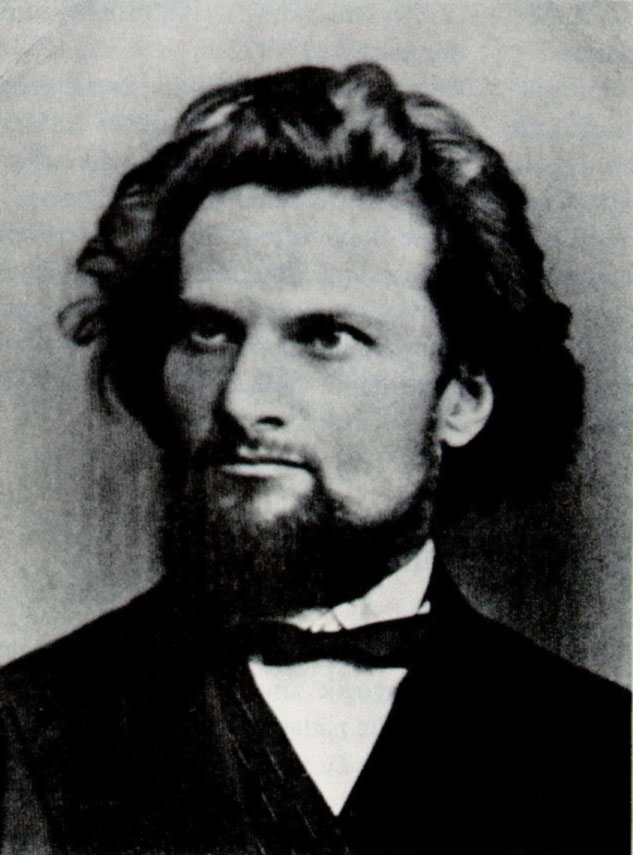
Alois Riehl

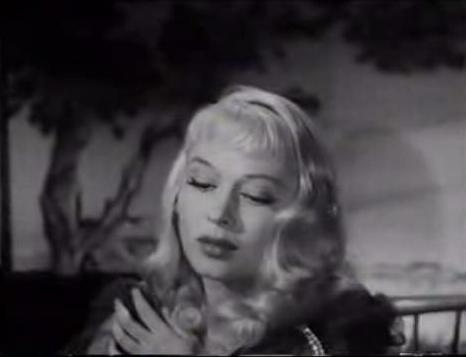
Dorian Gray in 1956

Notable people born in or associated with Bolzano include:

14th century

- Blessed Henry of Treviso (died 1315), a lay pilgrim and holy man, a German from Bolzano

18th century

- Joseph Tiefenthaler (1710–1785), a Jesuit missionary who wrote about India
- Johann Nepomuk von Tschiderer zu Gleifheim (1777–1860), Prince-Bishop of Trent
- Archduke Rainer Joseph of Austria (1783–1853), Viceroy of Lombardy-Venetia
- Jacob Anton Zallinger zum Thurn (1735–1813), philosopher and canonist
- Annette of Menz (1796–1869), in 1811 she was the richest heiress in Bolzano
- Jakob Schgraffer (1799–1859), composer

19th century

- Daniel Harrwitz (1821 – 1884), German chess master
- Heinrich Anton of Austria (1828–1891), Archduke of Austria
- Anton Ausserer (1843–1889), naturalist and arachnologist
- Alois Riehl (1844–1924), neo-Kantian philosopher
- Julius Perathoner (1849–1926), last mayor of Bolzano of German ethnicity, 1895–1922
- Alois Delug (1859–1930), painter and a professor at the Academy of Fine Arts, Vienna; rejected Adolf Hitler's application to join the academy.
- Ludwig Thuille (1861–1907), composer, teacher and music theorist
- Prince Carlos of Bourbon-Two Sicilies (1870–1949), member of the Spanish Royal family
- Karl Theodor Hoeniger (1881–1970), author and cultural historian
- Ressel Orla (1889–1931), actress, appeared in some of Fritz Lang's earliest films
- Max Valier (1895–1930), rocketry pioneer, astronomer and writer
- Christian Hess (1895–1944), painter and sculptor
- Walther Oberhaidacher (1896–1945), Austrian Nazi Party politician

20th century

- Josef Mayr-Nusser (1910–1945), South Tyrolean leader of the resistance against Nazi rule
- Maria Luise Thurmair (1912–2005), a Catholic theologian, hymnodist and writer
- Carlo Maria Giulini (1914–2005), conductor
- Silvius Magnago (1914–2010), lawyer and politician
- Maria Gardena (1920–2008), film actress and later architect
- Alcide Berloffa (1922–2011), politician
- Valentin Braitenberg (1926–2011), brain researcher, cyberneticist and writer
- Dorian Gray (1928–2011), actress
- Herbert Rosendorfer (1934–2012), German jurist and writer
- Giuseppe Anfossi (born 1935), bishop emeritus of the Diocese of Aosta 1994 to 2011
- Adolf Dallapozza (born 1940), tenor in opera, operetta and musical theatre at the Vienna Volksoper
- Ottavia Piccolo (born 1949), theatre and film actress
- Matteo Thun (born 1952), an architect and designer
- Andrea Bonatta (born 1952), pianist and conductor
- Franz Fischnaller (born 1954), new media artist and transdisciplinary researcher
- Cuno Tarfusser (born 1954), former judge of the International Criminal Court
- Lilli Gruber (born 1957), journalist, former politician and TV talk show host
- Marco Bergamo (1966–2017), the Monster of Bolzano, an Italian serial killer
- Sergio Azzolini (born 1967), bassoonist and music conductor
- Anna Unterberger (born 1985), actress

Sport

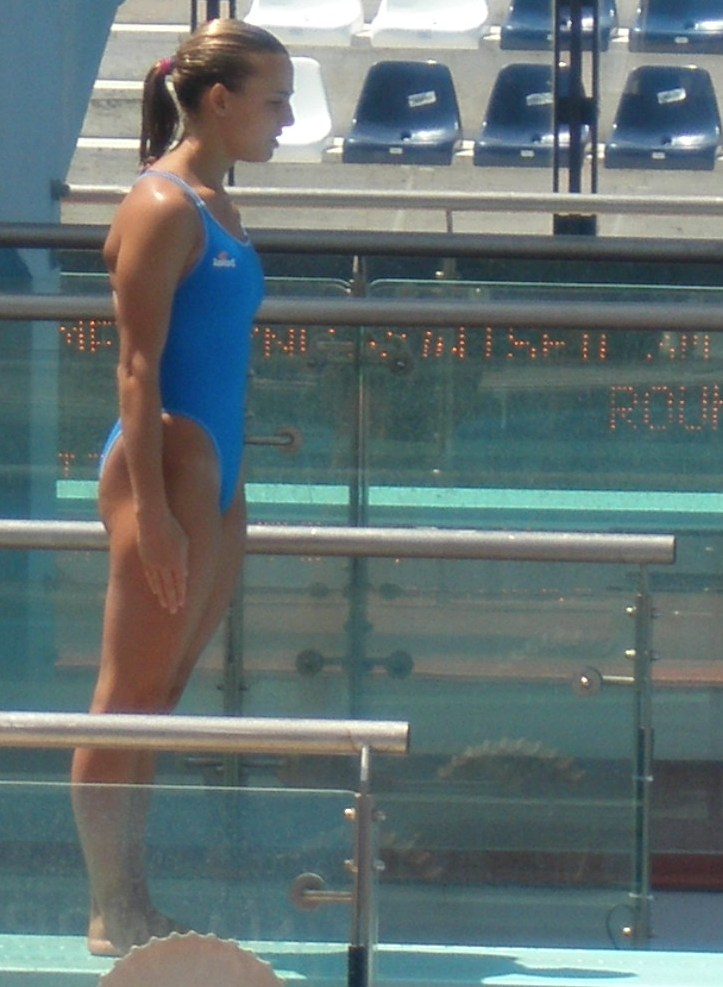
Tania Cagnotto, 2009

- Paula Wiesinger (1907–2001), mountaineer, ski racer and restaurateur
- Erika Lechner (born 1947), luger, medallist at the 1968 Winter Olympics
- Hans Kammerlander (born 1956), mountaineer
- Antonella Bellutti (born 1968), racing cyclist and two-time Olympic champion in track cycling
- Gerda Weissensteiner (born 1969), luger and bobsleigh pilot, competed in six Winter Olympics, gold medallist in the women's singles luge at the 1994 Winter Olympics and bronze medallist in the two-woman bobsleigh at the 2006 Winter Olympics
- Ylenia Scapin (born 1975), judoka, won two Olympic medals in different weight classes in 1996 and 2000.
- Isolde Kostner (born 1975), Alpine skier, two bronze medals at the 1994 Winter Olympics and a silver medal at the 2002 Winter Olympics
- Karen Putzer (born 1978), former alpine skier, bronze medallist at the 2002 Winter Olympics
- Andreas Seppi (born 1984), tennis player, has reached a career-high singles ranking of World Nr. 18.
- Manuela Gostner (born 1984), racing driver
- Tania Cagnotto (born 1985), world and European champion in diving, Olympic bronze and silver medallist
- Carolina Kostner (born 1987), figure skater, World Champion and Olympic bronze medalist
- Raphael Andergassen (born 1993), ice hockey player
- Alex Trivellato (born 1993), ice hockey player
- Peter Hochkofler (born 1994), ice hockey player
- Simone Giannelli (born 1996), volleyball player

== International relations ==
=== Twin towns – sister cities ===
Bolzano is twinned with:

- Erlangen, Germany
- Koziatyn, Ukraine
- Sopron, Hungary

== See also ==
- History of South Tyrol
- Italianization of South Tyrol
- Jacob Anton Zallinger zum Thurn
- Radio Tandem
- Tyrol
- Bloody Sunday (Bolzano)
