= Timeline of Bolzano =

The following is a timeline of the history of the city of Bolzano/Bozen in the Trentino-South Tyrol region of Italy.

== Prior to 20th century ==
- 14 BC – A military settlement called "Pons Drusi" is founded by Romans.
- 679 – Settlement and region ruled by the Duke of Bavaria ("comes Baiuvariorum, quem illi gravionem dicunt, qui regebat Bauzanum et reliqua castella").
- 769 – Tassilo III, Duke of Bavaria issues in Bolzano the foundation charter of the Innichen Abbey.
- 996–1000 – Settlement called "in Pauzana valle, quae lingua Teutisca Pozana nuncupatur".
- 1027 – Bozen county "given by the emperor Conrad II to the bishop of Trent."
- 1170 – Likely birthplace nearby of Walther von der Vogelweide, a German lyrical poet.
- 1170–80 ca. – The town is founded by the bishop of Trent.
- 1195 – The town's parson Rudolf is mentioned.
- 1237 – Franciscan Friary active.
- 1272 – Heilig-Geist-Spital (hospital) established.
- 1363 – Habsburg Rudolf IV, Duke of Austria in power.
- 1437 – The borough rights (Stadtrecht) issued.
- 1442 – Town council established by King Frederick III.
- 1443 and 1483 – Two great town fires destroy large parts of the inner city.
- 1472 – The Bozner Stadtbuch (Liber civitatis) instituted by mayor Konrad Lerhueber as the towns official register of legal acts.
- 1519 – The openwork spire of the Parish church (now Cathedral) finished by the stonemasons Burkhard Engelberg and Hans Lutz von Schussenried.
- 1551 – The Bozner Bürgerbuch, a register of the new citizens, instituted.
- 1635 – Merkantilmagistrat established.
- 1750 – Henry of Bolzano, a local layman of the early 14th century, also patron of Treviso, beatified by pope Benedict XIV.
- 1805 – Town becomes part of the Kingdom of Bavaria, first Civic Theatre established.
- 1810 – Town becomes part of French client Kingdom of Italy.
- 1813 – Town becomes part of Austria again.
- 1837 – Population: 10,499.^{(de)}
- 1842 – Bozner Wochenblatt newspaper begins publication.
- 1845 – Muri-Gries Abbey has been founded, as an offshoot of the former Swiss Muri abbey in Aargau.
- 1859 – Brenner Railway (Verona-Bozen) begins operating; Bozen railway station opens.
- 1861 – 10 November: Bozner Lichtfest held.
- 1862 – Turnverein Bozen 1862 (sport club) formed.
- 1867 – Brenner Railway (Innsbruck-Bozen) begins operating.
- 1874 – Cimitero militare austro-ungarico di Bolzano (Austro-Hungarian war cemetery) established.
- 1882 – Der Tiroler newspaper begins publication.
- 1889 – Walther von der Vogelweide monument erected in the Waltherplatz.
- 1894 – Bozner Nachrichten newspaper begins publication.
- 1895 – Julius Perathoner becomes mayor.
- 1898 – Überetsch Railway begins operating.
- 1900 – Population: 23,521.^{(de)}

== 20th century ==
- 1907 – Virglbahn (funicular) and Rittnerbahn (railway) begin operating.
- 1909 – Bolzano Tramway begins operating.
- 1912 – Guntschnabahn (funicular) begins operating.
- 1915 – Tiroler Soldaten-Zeitung newspaper begins publication.
- 1918
  - The new Civic Theatre (Stadttheater) opens.
  - Italian forces take South Tyrol region during World War I and rename it as "Alto Adige"
- 1921 – 24 April: Fascist unrest (Bloody Sunday).
- 1922 – 1–2 October: Fascist March on Bolzano occurs.
- 1923
  - Bolzano becomes part of the Province of Trento.
  - Italianization of South Tyrol begins.
- 1925 – German-language daily newspapers are banned.
- 1925 – 2 November: Gries becomes part of Bolzano.
- 1926
  - Bolzano Airport opens.
  - Dolomiten newspaper in publication.
- 1927 – The Province of Bolzano established and separated from the Trento Province.
- 1928 – The Fascist Bolzano Victory Monument inaugurated.
- 1930 – Stadio Druso (stadium) opens.
- 1931 – Associazione Calcio Bolzano (football club) formed.
- 1933 – HC Bolzano (ice hockey club) formed.
- 1936 – Population: 45,505.^{(de)}
- 1936 – The today's Corso della Libertà-Freiheitsstraße (Liberty Avenue), a major civic boulevard adorned by buildings in monumentalist style, has been created by the fascist regime (then called Corso IX Maggio).
- 1939–40 – The South Tyrol Option Agreement leads to the emigration of parts of the german-speaking population into the Third Reich.
- 1939–42 – The local Casa del Fascio built displaying a monumental Mussolini basrelief, recontextualized in 2017.
- 1943
  - September: South Tyrol region annexed by Germany; Bolzano becomes part of the Nazi German Operationszone Alpenvorland (district).
  - Allied air raids on Bolzano begin.
- 1944 – Bolzano Transit Camp begins operating.
- 1945 – Town liberated by allied forces from the nazifascist occupational forces on May 4
  - December: "Official sanction of the German language" begins.
  - South Tyrolean People's Party headquartered in Bolzano.
  - Dolomiten and Alto Adige newspapers begin publication.
- 1948
  - Bolzano becomes part of the newly formed Trentino-Alto Adige province.
  - November: Trentino-Alto Adige/Südtirol regional election, 1948 held.
  - Bolzano Tramway closes.
- 1950 – Teatro Stabile di Bolzano (theatre) founded.
- 1951 – Population: 70,898.^{(de)}
- 1960 – Rai Südtirol (radio) begins broadcasting.
- 1961 – Night of fire happened.
- 1964 – Roman Catholic Diocese of Bolzano-Brixen established.
- 1966 – Rai Südtirol (TV channel) begins broadcasting.
- 1967 – Haus der Kultur „Walther von der Vogelweide“ (Waltherhaus), a theatre and culture venue inaugurated.
- 1968 – Giancarlo Bolognini becomes mayor.
- 1971 – Population: 105,757.^{(de)}
- 1972 – The Second Autonomy Statute implements measures of local self-government.
- 1974 – F.C. Südtirol (football club) formed.
- 1977 – Radio Tandem begins broadcasting.
- 1985 – Museion – Museum of Modern and Contemporary Art (museum) founded.
- 1988 – Mattino dell'Alto Adige newspaper begins publication.
- 1992 – Eurac Research (European Academy Bozen-Bolzano), a transdisciplinary research centre, founded.
- 1995
  - Giovanni Salghetti Drioli becomes mayor.
  - Regional Civic Network of South Tyrol (website) launched.
- 1996
  - Neue Südtiroler Tageszeitung (newspaper) begins publication.
  - F.C. Bolzano 1996 (football club) formed.
- 1997 – Free University of Bozen-Bolzano founded.
- 1998
  - South Tyrol Museum of Archaeology established.
  - Merkantilmuseum opens.
- 1999 – Teatro comunale (Bolzano) (theatre) opens.

== 21st century ==
- 2003 – Corriere dell'Alto Adige newspaper begins publication.
- 2005 – Luigi Spagnolli becomes mayor.
- 2008 – New Museion (museum of contemporary arts) building opens.
- 2013
  - October: Trentino-Alto Adige/Südtirol provincial elections held.
  - University's Zentrum für Regionalgeschichte (regional history institute) founded.
  - Population: 103,891.
- 2014 – BZ ’18–’45: one monument, one city, two dictatorships, a permanent exhibition within the fascist Monument to Victory is inaugurated.
- 2015 – The so-called Stolpersteine, Holocaust victims commemorative markers, are laid out.
- 2016 – Local election held; Renzo Caramaschi becomes mayor.
- 2017 – The former Casa del Fascio historicized.
- 2018 – NOI Techpark Südtirol/Alto Adige, a large science and technology park within the former industrial zone, opens.
- 2019 – WaltherPark, a large urban renewal project designed by David Chipperfield starts.
- 2021 – The town is granted the annual City of Memory status by the Interior Ministry.
- 2024 – After the Benko Group cracked, the Bavarian Schoeller Group takes over the WaltherPark construction project.
- 2025 – The Waltherpark shopping centre and district opens.
- 2026 – The Courthouse, which dates from the late Fascist era, has partially collapsed.

== See also ==
- Bolzano history
- History of Bolzano
- List of mayors of Bolzano
- Civic Archives in Bozen-Bolzano (city archives)
- Bolzano State Archives
- List of Stolpersteine in Bolzano (Holocaust victims commemorative markers)
- History of South Tyrol region
- Raetia, ancient Roman province of which Bauzanum was part

Timelines of other cities in the macroregion of Northeast Italy:^{(it)}

- Emilia-Romagna region: Timeline of Bologna; Ferrara; Forlì; Modena; Parma; Piacenza; Ravenna; Reggio Emilia; Rimini
- Friuli-Venezia Giulia region: Timeline of Trieste
- Trentino-South Tyrol region: Timeline of Trento
- Veneto region: Timeline of Padua; Treviso; Venice; Verona, Vicenza

== Bibliography ==
=== in English ===
- "Botzen". Chambers's Encyclopaedia. London. 1901. hdl:2027/njp.32101065312876.
- Coolidge, William Augustus Brevoort (1910). "Botzen" . Encyclopædia Britannica. Vol. 4 (11th ed.). p. 311.
- "Botzen", Austria-Hungary (11th ed.), Leipzig: Karl Baedeker, 1911, pp. 207–10
- Roy Domenico (2002). "Trentino-Alto Adige: Bolzano". Regions of Italy: a Reference Guide to History and Culture. Greenwood. pp. 301–4. ISBN 0313307334.
- Hannes Obermair [in German] (2014). "Use of Records in Medieval Towns: The Case of Bolzano, South Tyrol". In Marco Mostert; Anna Adamska (eds.). Writing and the Administration of Medieval Towns. Utrecht Studies in Medieval Literacy. Turnhout: Brepols. ISBN 978-2-503-54959-0.
- Obermair, Hannes (2017), "Monuments and the City—an almost inextricable entanglement", in Matthias Fink; et al. (eds.), Multiple Identitäten in einer "glokalen Welt"—Identità multiple in un "mondo glocale"—Multiple identities in a "glocal world", Bozen-Bolzano: Eurac Research, pp. 88–99, ISBN 978-88-98857-35-7

=== in German ===
- Bozner Chronik (written in 14th century)
- Beda Weber (1849). Stadt Bozen und ihre Umgebungen (in German). Bozen: Eberle.
- Leopold Kastner, ed. (1867). "Bozen". Handels- und Gewerbe-Adressbuch des österreichischen Kaiserstaates. Vienna: Beck'sche Universitätsbuchhandlung.
- Eduard Gottlieb Amthor [in German] (1872). Bozen und Umgebung (in German). Gera.
- "Bozen". Brockhaus' Konversations-Lexikon (in German). Vol. 3 (14th ed.). Leipzig: Brockhaus. 1896. hdl:2027/njp.32101064064452.
- Mayr, Sabine; Obermair, Hannes (2014). "Sprechen über den Holocaust. Die jüdischen Opfer in Bozen — eine vorläufige Bilanz". Der Schlern. 88,3, pp. 4–36. ISSN 0036-6145.
- Obermair, Hannes (1995), "Kirche und Stadtentstehung. Die Pfarrkirche Bozen im Hochmittelalter (11.–13. Jahrhundert)", in Der Schlern (ed.), Zeitschrift für Südtiroler Landeskunde, vol. 69, Bozen-Bolzano: Athesia, pp. 449–74.
- Hannes Obermair (2005–2008). Bozen Süd – Bolzano Nord: Schriftlichkeit und urkundliche Überlieferung der Stadt Bozen bis 1500 (2 volumes) (in German). Bozen-Bolzano. ISBN 978-88-901870-1-8.
- Sabrina Michielli, Hannes Obermair (2016). BZ '18–'45: ein Denkmal, eine Stadt, zwei Diktaturen. Begleitband zur Dokumentations-Ausstellung im Bozener Siegesdenkmal. Vienna-Bozen/Bolzano: Folio Verlag. ISBN 978-3-85256-713-6.

=== in Italian ===
- "Bolzano", Enciclopedia Italiana (Treccani) (in Italian), 1930
- Bolzano fra i Tirolo e gli Asburgo / Bozen von den Grafen von Tirol bis zu den Habsburgern (in Italian and German). Civic Archives in Bozen-Bolzano. 1999.
- Heiss, Hans; Obermair, Hannes (2014). "Culture della memoria in contrasto. L'esempio della città di Bolzano-Bozen dal 2000 al 2010". In Obermair, Hannes (ed.). Erinnerungskulturen des 20. Jahrhunderts im Vergleich—Culture della memoria del novecento a confronto. Città di Bolzano. pp. 19–34. ISBN 978-88-907060-9-7.
- Hannes Obermair; Fabrizio Miori; Maurizio Pacchiani (2020). Lavori in Corso – Die Bozner Freiheitsstraße (in Italian and German). La Fabbrica del Tempo–Die Zeitfabrik. ISBN 978-88-943205-2-7.
