= Timeline of Trieste =

The following is a timeline of the history of the city of Trieste in the Friuli-Venezia Giulia region of Italy.

== Prior to 19th century ==
- 79 AD – Via Flavia (Dalmatia–Tergeste) built.
- 1203 – Captured by the Republic of Venice.
- 1320 – Trieste Cathedral built.
- 1352 – Public clock installed (approximate date).
- 1382 – Trieste becomes a Habsburg imperial free city.
- 1385 – Trieste Cathedral consecrated.
- 1680 – Castle built.
- 1682 – Church of Santa Maria Maggiore built.
- 1719 – City becomes a free port.
- 1753 – Nautical School founded.
- 1755 – Trieste Commodity Exchange established.
- 1756 – Canal Grande (Trieste) constructed.
- 1776 – Karl von Zinzendorf becomes governor of Trieste.
- 1783 – Jewish primary school opens.
- 1784 – L'Osservatore Triestino newspaper begins publication.
- 1787 – Greek Orthodox Church of San Nicolò dei Greci built.
- 1793 – Pubblica Biblioteca Arcadica Triestina (library) established.

== 19th century ==
- 1801 – Teatro Nuovo (opera house) inaugurated.
- 1809 – Trieste ceded to the French as part of the Illyrian Provinces in the Treaty of Schönbrunn.
- 1810
  - Gabinetto di Minerva literary society founded.
  - Population: 29,908.
- 1814 – Austrians returned to power in the Treaty of Paris.
- 1828 – Catholic Diocese of Trieste-Koper established.
- 1831 – Assicurazioni Generali insurance company in business.
- 1833 – Österreichischer Lloyd shipping firm in business.
- 1835 – Schiller Society founded.
- 1839
  - Caffe degli Specchi in business.
  - Muzio Tommasini becomes mayor.
- 1840 – Tergesteo built.
- 1842 – Civico Orto Botanico di Trieste (garden) and Savings Bank of Trieste established.
- 1846 – Civico Museo di Storia Naturale di Trieste (museum) established.
- 1848
  - May to Aug − Harbour blockaded by an Italian fleet.
  - 25 October: Premiere of Verdi's opera Il corsaro.
- 1849 – Trieste becomes a Habsburg imperial free city again.
- 1851 – Trieste Astronomical Observatory established.
- 1853 – Trieste Chamber of Commerce and Industry established.
- 1857
  - Austrian Southern Railway (Vienna-Trieste) begins operating.
  - Trieste Centrale railway station opens.
  - Stabilimento Tecnico Triestino shipbuilding firm in business near city.
- 1860 – Miramare Castle built near city for Austrian archduke Maximilian.
- 1871 – Richard Burton becomes British consul in Trieste.
- 1872 – Revoltella Museum founded.
- 1878 – Politeama Rossetti theatre built.
- 1880 – Population: 144,844.
- 1881 – Il Piccolo newspaper begins publication.
- 1882
  - September: Emperor of Austria Franz Joseph I visits city.
  - Agricultural exhibition held.
- 1883 – Harbour constructed.
- 1885 – Saint Spyridon Church building inaugurated.
- 1887 – Trieste–Hrpelje railway begins operating.
- 1888 - Monument erected to commemorate 500th anniversary of connexion with Austria.
- 1891 – City ended being a free port.
- 1899 – Circolo di Studi Sociali (civic group) founded.
- 1900 – Population: 132,879.

== 20th century ==
- 1902 – Trieste–Opicina tramway begins operating.
- 1904 – Trieste National Hall opens.
- 1905 – Coffee exchange established.
- 1906 − Opening of the Karawanks Tunnel (railway) completed the railway from Trieste to Klagenfurt.
- 1912
  - Synagogue of Trieste completed.
  - Circolo Sportivo Ponziana (football club) formed.
  - Savoia Excelsior Palace hotel in business.
- 1914 – Caffè San Marco in business.
- 1918
  - Unione Triestina football club formed.
  - La Nazione newspaper begins publication.
  - Umana literary journal begins publication.
- 1919 – Trieste becomes part of the Kingdom of Italy per Treaty of Saint-Germain-en-Laye (signed on 10 September 1919 and effective on 16 July 1920).
- 1920 – 13 July: Trieste National Hall burnt by Fascist Blackshirts.
- 1924 – University of Trieste and Rotary Club established.
- 1927 – Vittoria Lighthouse built.
- 1930 – Cantieri Riuniti dell'Adriatico shipbuilding firm in business.
- 1931 – Radio Trst begins broadcasting.
- 1932 – Stadio Littorio opens.
- 1943
  - September: Nazi German Operational Zone of the Adriatic Littoral headquartered in Trieste.
  - September: City becomes part of the Italian Social Republic.
  - Risiera di San Sabba Nazi concentration camp established near city.
- 1945
  - 1 May: City taken by Yugoslav forces.
  - 2 May: German surrender to Allied forces.
  - Primorski dnevnik Slovene-language newspaper begins publication.
- 1947 – 15 September: City becomes part of the Free Territory of Trieste of the United Nations Security Council.
- 1949
  - June: Municipal election held.
  - Gianni Bartoli becomes mayor.
  - Museo Sartorio opens.
- 1953 – Administration of Free Territory of Trieste passes to Italy.
- 1954 – Some of Trieste becomes part of Italy; the remainder becomes part of Yugoslavia.
- 1958 – Mario Franzil becomes mayor.
- 1961 – Trieste Airport in operation.
- 1963 – Orto Botanico dell'Università di Trieste (garden) established.
- 1964 – International Centre for Theoretical Physics headquartered near city.
- 1965 – Temple of Monte Grisa (church) built near city.
- 1970 – City becomes capital of the Friuli-Venezia Giulia region (approximate date).
- 1975 – Protest against Treaty of Osimo.
- 1978 – International School for Advanced Studies established.
- 1992 – Stadio Nereo Rocco opens.
- 1993
  - Riccardo Illy becomes mayor.
  - Elettra Sincrotrone Trieste research centre established near city.
- 1996 – Central European Initiative headquartered in Trieste.

== 21st century ==
- 2001 – Roberto Dipiazza becomes mayor.
- 2006 – Italia Marittima shipping firm active.
- 2011
  - Roberto Cosolini becomes mayor.
  - Population: 205,535.

== See also ==
- History of Trieste (it)
- Other names of Trieste
- List of presidents of Friuli-Venezia Giulia region since 1960s
- List of mayors of Trieste

Timelines of other cities in the macroregion of Northeast Italy:^{(it)}

- Emilia-Romagna region: Timeline of Bologna; Ferrara; Forlì; Modena; Parma; Piacenza; Ravenna; Reggio Emilia; Rimini
- Trentino-South Tyrol region: Timeline of Bolzano; Trento
- Veneto region: Timeline of Padua; Treviso; Venice; Verona; Vicenza

== Bibliography ==
=== Published in the 19th century ===
- Abraham Rees (1819), "Trieste", The Cyclopaedia, London: Longman, Hurst, Rees, Orme & Brown
- Girolamo Agapito (1824). Compiuta e distresa descrizione della fedelissima città e porto-franco di Trieste [Description of the City and Free Port of Trieste] (in Italian). Vienna: Antonio Strauss.
- David Brewster, ed. (1832). "Trieste". Edinburgh Encyclopaedia. Philadelphia: Joseph and Edward Parker. hdl:2027/uc2.ark:/13960/t3dz0hq2k.
- J. Joyce (1851), "Sketch of Trieste", Recollections of the Salzkammergut, Ischl, Salzburg, Bad Gastein ... with a Sketch of Trieste, Frankfort
- Giovannina Bandelli (1851). Notizie storiche di Trieste e guida per la città [History of Trieste and Guide to the City] (in Italian). Coen.
- * Charles Knight, ed. (1866). "Trieste". Geography. English Cyclopaedia. Vol. 4. London: Bradbury, Evans, & Co. hdl:2027/nyp.33433000064810.
- "Trieste", Appleton's European Guide Book, London: Longmans, Green, Reader, and Dyer, 1871
- "Trieste", Southern Germany and Austria (2nd ed.), Coblenz: Karl Baedeker, 1871, OCLC 4090237
- "Trieste", Bradshaw's Hand-Book to the Turkish Empire, vol. 1: Turkey in Europe, London: W.J. Adams, c. 1872
- William Smith, ed. (1872) [1854]. "Tergeste". Dictionary of Greek and Roman Geography. London: John Murray. hdl:2027/hvd.ah5cur.
- R. Burton (October 1875), "Port of Trieste", Journal of the Society of Arts, vol. 23, London, pp. 56 v, hdl:2027/uc1.b2876382 + part 2
- David Kay (1880), "Principal Towns: Trieste", Austria-Hungary, Foreign Countries and British Colonies, London: Sampson Low, Marston, Searle, & Rivington, hdl:2027/mdp.39015030647005
- W. Pembroke Fetridge (1881), "Trieste", Harper's Hand-book for Travellers in Europe and the East, New York: Harper & Brothers
- "Triest", Ober-Italien [Northern Italy], Meyers Reisebücher (in German) (4th ed.), Leipzig: Bibliographisches Institut, 1884, hdl:2027/uc1.$b500241
- Thomas Graham Jackson (1887), "Trieste", Dalmatia, Oxford: Clarendon Press
- "Trieste". Nuova Enciclopedia Italiana (in Italian) (6th ed.). Torino: Unione Tipografico-Editrice Torinese. 1887.
- Norddeutscher Lloyd (1896), "Trieste", Guide through Germany, Austria-Hungary, Italy, Switzerland, France, Belgium, Holland and England, Berlin: J. Reichmann & Cantor, OCLC 8395555

=== Published in the 20th century ===
- "Trieste". Chambers's Encyclopaedia. London. 1901.
- Giulio Caprin (1906), Trieste (in Italian), Bergamo: Istituto italiano d'arti grafiche, OL 14046192M (profusely illustrated)
- "Triest", Jewish Encyclopedia, vol. 12, New York, 1907
- "Trieste", Guide through Germany, Austria-Hungary, Switzerland, Italy, France, Belgium, Holland, the United Kingdom, Spain, Portugal, &c (9th ed.), Berlin: J.H. Herz, 1908, OCLC 36795367
- Arthur L. Frothingham (1910), "Trieste", Roman Cities in Northern Italy and Dalmatia, London: J. Murray
- Benjamin Vincent (1910), "Trieste", Haydn's Dictionary of Dates (25th ed.), London: Ward, Lock & Co.
- "Trieste" . Encyclopædia Britannica. Vol. 27 (11th ed.). 1910. pp. 269–270.
- "Trieste", Austria-Hungary (11th ed.), Leipzig: Karl Baedeker, 1911
- "Trieste". Le Tre Venézie. Guida d'Italia (in Italian). Milan: Touring Club Italiano. 1920. p. 247+ – via HathiTrust.
- Novak, Bogdan (1970). Trieste 1941–1954: the ethnic, political and ideological struggle. Chicago: University of Chicago Press. ISBN 0-226-59621-4.
- Angelo Ara, Claudio Magris. Trieste. Un'identità di frontiera. Einaudi Editore. Torino, 1982. ISBN 88-06-59823-6
- Cary, Joseph (1993). A Ghost in Trieste. Chicago: University of Chicago Press. ISBN 0-226-09528-2.
- Marengo Vaglio, Carla (1994). "Trieste as a linguistic melting pot". La Revue des Lettres Modernes (1173): 55–74.
- Sluga, Glenda (1994). "Trieste: ethnicity and the Cold War, 1945–1954". Journal of Contemporary History. 29 (2): 285–304. doi:10.1177/002200949402900204. S2CID 154280355.

=== Published in the 21st century ===
in English

- Hametz, Maura (December 2001). "The Carabinieri stood by: The Italian state and the "Slavic Threat" in Trieste, 1919–1922". Nationalities Papers. 29 (4): 559–574. doi:10.1080/00905990120102093. S2CID 155037121.
- Morris, Jan. Trieste and the Meaning of Nowhere. DaCapo Press. Cambridge, Mass, 2001
- Anna Campanile (2004). "Torn Soul of a City: Trieste as a Center of Polyphonic Culture and Literature". In Marcel Cornis-Pope and John Neubauer (ed.). History of the Literary Cultures of East-Central Europe: Junctures and Disjunctures in the 19th and 20th Centuries. John Benjamins Publishing. ISBN 90-272-3453-1.
- Maura Elise Hametz (2005). Making Trieste Italian, 1918-1954. UK: Boydell & Brewer. ISBN 978-0-86193-279-5.
- Sabine Rutar (2006). "Internationalist Networking in a Multinational Setting: Social Democratic Cultural Associations in Austro-Hungarian Trieste 1900–1914". In Graeme Morton; et al. (eds.). Civil Society, Associations, and Urban Places: Class, Nation, and Culture in 19th-Century Europe. Ashgate. pp. 87–101. ISBN 978-0-7546-5247-2.
- Eric Jenkins (2012). "Trieste". To Scale: One Hundred Urban Plans. Routledge. ISBN 978-1-136-74606-2.
- Aleksej Kalc (2012). "Immigration Policy in 18th Century Trieste". In Bert De Munck and Anne Winter (ed.). Gated Communities?: Regulating Migration in Early Modern Cities. Ashgate. ISBN 978-1-4094-3130-5.

in Italian

- Franco Gleria and Maurizio Radacich. Il terrore viene dal cielo. Trieste: 1944/1945 (Trieste: Italo Svevo Edizioni, 2007)
