= Radio Tandem =

Radio Tandem is the name of two radio stations:

- Radio Tandem (Italy), a station based in Bolzano, South Tyrol, Italy
- Radio Tandem (Kazakhstan), a radio broadcast in Atyrau and Aktobe, Kazakhstan.
