= Franz Thaler =

Italian Nazi-dissenter & author (1925-2015)

Franz Thaler (6 March 1925 in Sarntal – 29 October 2015) was an author from South Tyrol, a peacock quill embroiderer and a survivor of the concentration camp in Dachau and satellite camp in Hersbruck.

In 1939 his father decided in the South Tyrol Option Agreement that his family should remain Italian citizens, not adopt German nationality. As a consequence his family was harassed and isolated: Thaler was no longer allowed to attend school. In 1944, at the age of 19, he was called up to do military service in the German Wehrmacht, despite his Italian nationality. At first he went into hiding for several months, but finally gave himself up when his family was threatened with reprisals. Thaler received a sentence of 10 years’ imprisonment in Dachau concentration camp from a military court.

In December 1944 he was taken to Dachau and then, in the same month, to Hersbruck, a subsidiary camp of Flossenbürg concentration camp, where he then had to do hard labour. He was later brought back to Dachau. On 29 April 1945 the concentration camp in Dachau was liberated by American troops. He, and many of his fellow inmates, were forced to march to a camp in France, where they were finally set free.

When he returned home in August 1945, he began to write down his experiences, which appeared in book form as Unvergessen (Unforgotten) in 1989. The book was translated into Italian as Dimenticare mai.

Unvergessen was an important catalyst in initiating, and contributing to, the discussion of what happened in South Tyrol during the Nazi era.

As demonstrated by his biography, his memoir, and his statements in Leo Hauser’s documentary Des bringst du nimmer ausm Kopf – Die Erinnerungen des Franz Thaler (1997, produced by ZeLIG; loosely translated as You’ll Never Get It Out of Your Head – The Memories of Franz Thaler), he remained a staunch advocate of peaceful coexistence among South Tyrol’s three main linguistic groups.

Thaler continued to work as a quill embroiderer and silversmith in Sarntal up to his retirement.

In 1997 he received the Order of Merit of the Land of Tyrol, in 2010 he was awarded the honorary citizenship of Bolzano, and in 2013 he was chosen, together with Nazi opponent and victim, Josef Mayr-Nusser, by the South Tyrolian Society for Political Science as Political Personality of the Year. He turned 90 years old on 6 March 2015, shortly before the anniversary of the Liberation of Dachau on 29 April 2015. Thaler died in October 2015.

In 2016, his daughters donated his papers to the Civic Archives in Bozen-Bolzano.

== Publications ==
- Unvergessen. Option, KZ, Kriegsgefangenschaft, Heimkehr. Ein Sarner erzählt. Edition Raetia, Bozen 1999, ISBN 88-7283-128-8.
- Dimenticare mai: opzioni, campo di concentramento di Dachau, prigioniero di guerra, ritorno a casa. Übersetzung von Peter Litturi, Vorwort von Carlo Romeo, Zeitleiste von Leopold Steurer, Edition Raetia, Bozen 1990, ISBN 88-7283-206-3
- Unforgotten: a Memoir of Dachau, translated with a foreword by Paul Crichton and Christl Kiener, Kiener Press, London-München 2011, ISBN 978-3-943324-99-0
