= Das Land Südtirol =

Government gazette of South Tyrol

The Das Land Südtirol (English: The State of South Tyrol) is a monthly German-language publication of the Südtiroler Landtag (South Tyrolian Landtag) in South Tyrol. The journal is published, with the exception of January and August, ten times a year in the first week of the month. Each edition features a several-pages long summary of the previous sessions of the assembly. Subscription of the publication is free of charge.

== See also ==
- Civic Network of South Tyrol
