= Roberto Cosolini =

Italian politician (born 1956)

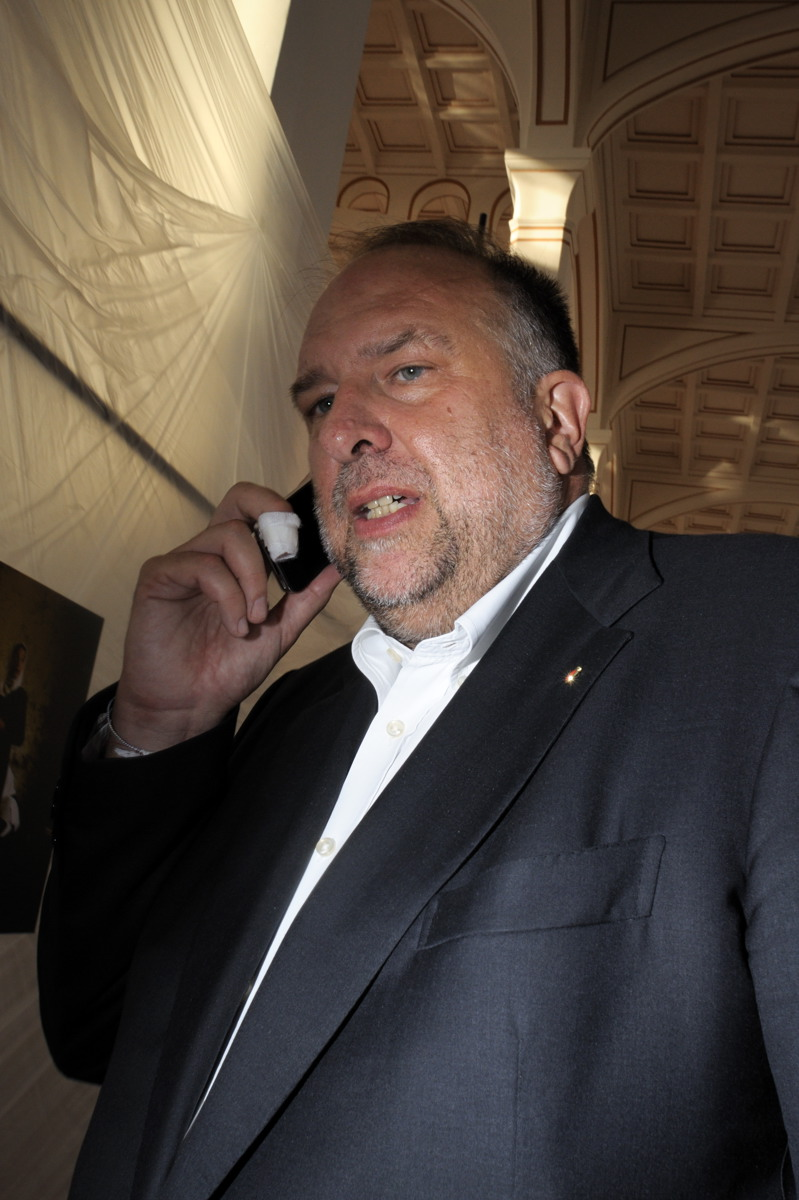

Member of the Regional Council of Friuli-Venezia Giulia
- Incumbent
- Assumed office 8 July 2016

Mayor of Trieste
- In office 31 May 2011 – 20 June 2016
- Preceded by: Roberto Dipiazza
- Succeeded by: Roberto Dipiazza

Personal details
- Born: 14 May 1956 (age 69) Trieste, Italy
- Party: Democratic Party
- Profession: Politician

Roberto Cosolini (born 14 May 1956) is an Italian politician who served as Mayor of Trieste from 2011 to 2016.

== Biography ==
Cosolini began his career in the 1980s as provincial secretary, and then regional secretary, of the National Confederation of Crafts and Small and Medium-Sized Enterprises. In 2003, with the election of Riccardo Illy as President of Friuli-Venezia Giulia, Cosolini is appointed regional assessor for Labor, Education, Universities and Research.

After winning the centre-left primaries for the candidacy for the office of mayor of Trieste, Cosolini is elected mayor in May 2011. In 2016, Cosolini tried to achieve reelection, but he was defeated by his predecessor and centre-right candidate Roberto Dipiazza.
