= Bolzano Tramway =

Former Tramway in Bolzano

Coordinates: 46°29′54″N 11°21′17″E

Bolzano Tram / Straßenbahn Bozen

Overview
- Status: abandoned
- Termini: Guntschna funicular; Laives/Brennero Street
- Stations: 8

Service
- Type: tramway

History
- Opened: July 1, 1909
- Closed: 1948

Technical
- Line length: 5,00 km
- Track gauge: 1,000 mm (3 ft 3 3/8 in)
- Electrification: yes
Route map

The Bolzano Tram (Straßenbahn Bozen) is a former transport net, built to connect the various villages near Bolzano, in what is now South Tyrol, northern Italy. At the time, Zwölfmalgreien, Bolzano and Gries were three independent municipalities.

== Track ==
The first built line started at the today called Guntschna street, near the former Guntschna funicular. From there it got to the Piazza Gries and to Talfer Bridge, to enter the Bolzano city. Today Piazza Gries and the Talfer Bridge are connected by a broad street, but this street was built later during Fascism in Italy, and so the tram crosses the field near small streets. In the center of Bolzano the track had some really small curve radius because of the old buildings. After arriving at Walther Square, where it meets the terminus track of the Rittnerbahn (or Renon Railway), the line went on the station alley and from there to Brennero Street. The second line was built in various sections, because the company that runs the Brennero railway thought the new tram would be a hard concurrent between Laives and Bolzano, since the Laives railway station was really far away from the village. Finally the line was built along the Brennero Street from Laives to Walther Square, where it shared the tracks with line one and the Renon railway until the Bolzano station, where it had its own terminus.

== Abandonment ==
The company had some really good years, in which many local factories had their own tracks to the tram line. In the best years they bought some cars from the Merano tram company, which had some financial problems at that time. After World War II the network was abandoned and substituted by some bus lines. The now unused cars returned to the Merano tram company where they remained until the service was suspended.

== Today ==
The former carhouse of the tram lines was still visible near Piazza della Vittoria-Siegesplatz up to some years ago. Like in some other cities in political campaigns of the local politicians sometimes there has been talk of reactivating the tram to reduce air pollution in the city, which today has a lot of traffic.

== Sources ==
- Josef Dultinger: Vergessene Vergangenheit. Verlag Dr. Rudolf Erhard, Rum 1982
- Josef Dultinger: Auf schmaler Spur durch Südtirol. Verlag Dr. Rudolf Erhard, Rum 1982
