= Bolzano Victory Monument =

Monument in Bolzano, northernmost Italy

Coordinates: 46°30′02″N 11°20′42″E

Victory Monument in Bolzano-Bozen

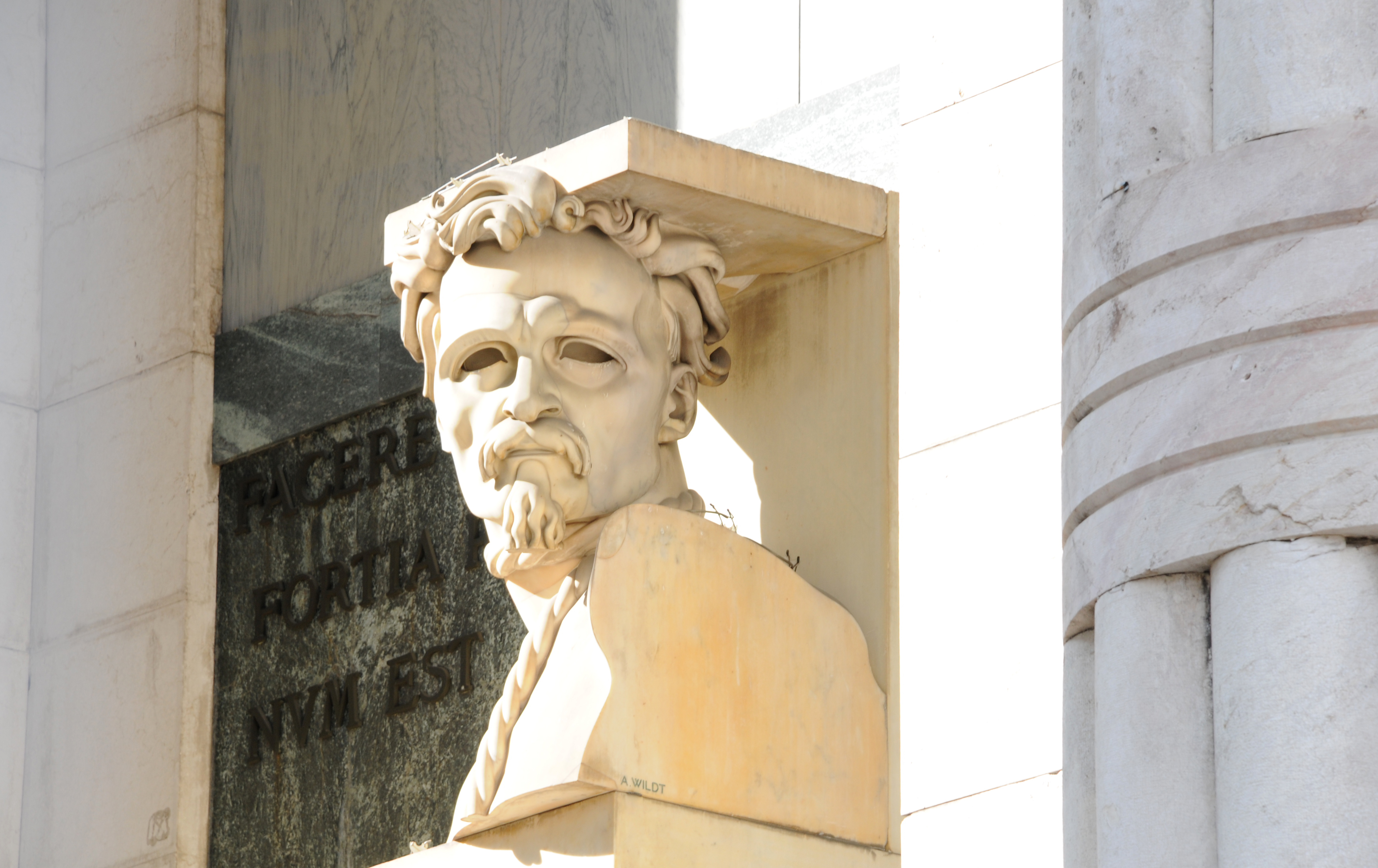
Sculpture portraying Cesare Battisti, by Adolfo Wildt

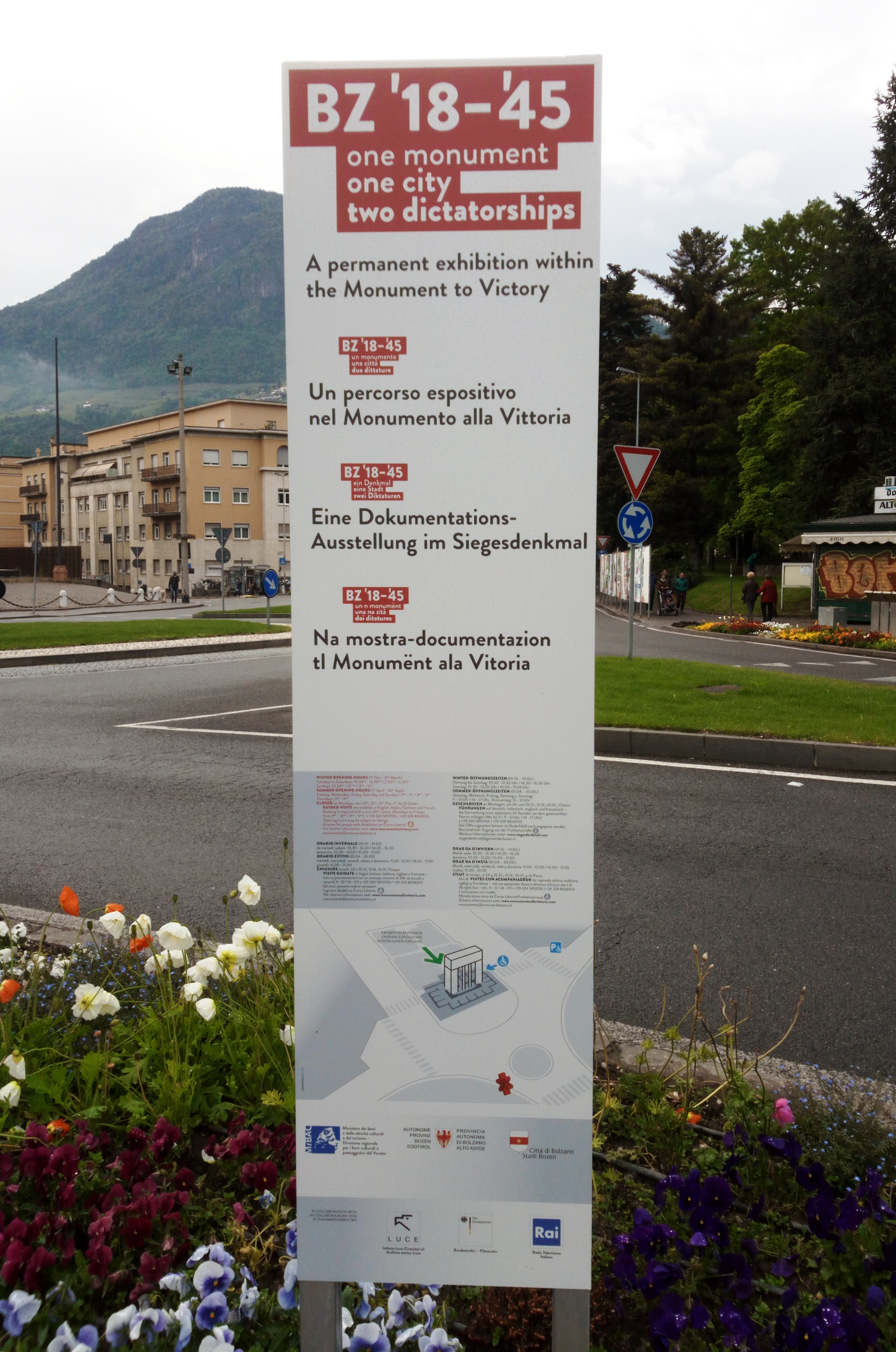
Multilingual signpost of the Permanent Exhibition «BZ '18–'45: One Monument, One City, Two Dictatorships»

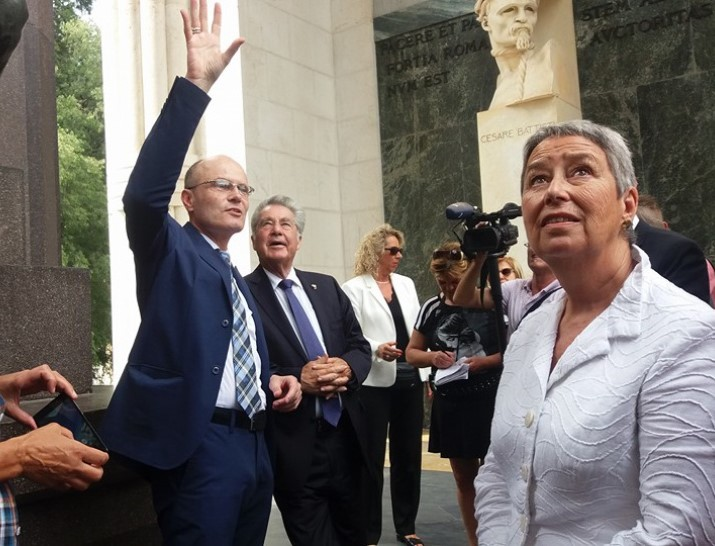
The Austrian president Heinz Fischer and his wife Margit visiting the monument in June 2016

The Victory Monument (Italian: Monumento alla Vittoria; German: Siegesdenkmal) is a monument in Bolzano, northernmost Italy, erected on the personal orders of Benito Mussolini in South Tyrol, which had been annexed from Austria after World War I. The 19-metre-wide Victory Gate was designed by architect Marcello Piacentini and substituted the former Austrian Kaiserjäger monument, torn down in 1926–27. Its construction in Fascist style, displaying lictorial pillars, was dedicated to the "Martyrs of World War I".

The following Latin script can be seen on the main façade:

HIC PATRIAE FINES SISTE SIGNA / HINC CETEROS EXCOLVIMVS LINGVA LEGIBVS ARTIBVS
Here is the border of the fatherland. Set down the standards. From this point on we have educated others in language, law and culture.

The monument was inaugurated on 12 July 1928 by King Victor Emmanuel III and major representatives of the fascist government.

The inscription, referring to Roman imperial history, was seen as provocative by many within the German-speaking majority in the province of South Tyrol. On the day of the inauguration there was a counter-demonstration with 10,000 people in Innsbruck.

Since its construction, the monument has been a focal point of the tensions between the Italian- and German-speaking communities in Bolzano and in the whole region; after various attempts to blow it up carried out by South Tyrolean separatist groups in the late 1970s, it has been fenced off to protect it from further defacement.

Only in 2014, by a joint decision taken by the Italian Ministry of Culture, the South Tyrolean Provincial Government and the Municipality of Bolzano, the Monument has been reopened to the public along with a permanent exhibition (under the title "BZ '18–'45: one monument, one city, two dictatorships") focusing on the history of the monument, within the context of Italian fascism and the Nazi occupation of 1943–45.

In 2016, the exhibition was granted a special commendation by the Judging Panel of the European Museum of the Year Award which pointed out that "the exhibition reintegrates a controversial monument, which has long served as the focal point of battles over politics, culture, and regional identity. The project is a highly courageous and professional initiative to promote humanism, tolerance and democracy".

Similarly to the Victory Monument, in 2017 also the former Casa del Fascio and its monumental fascist bas-relief have been recontextualized on behalf of the Provincial Administration by adding an illuminated inscription quoting Hannah Arendt. Both initiatives combined a historical approach with a touch of irony, aiming to turning difficult heritages into democratic resources.

== See also ==
- Timeline of Bolzano
- History of South Tyrol
