= Rittnerbahn =

Light railway near Bolzano, Italy

Coordinates: 46.5281°N 11.4067°E

Rittnerbahn (Ritten Railway)
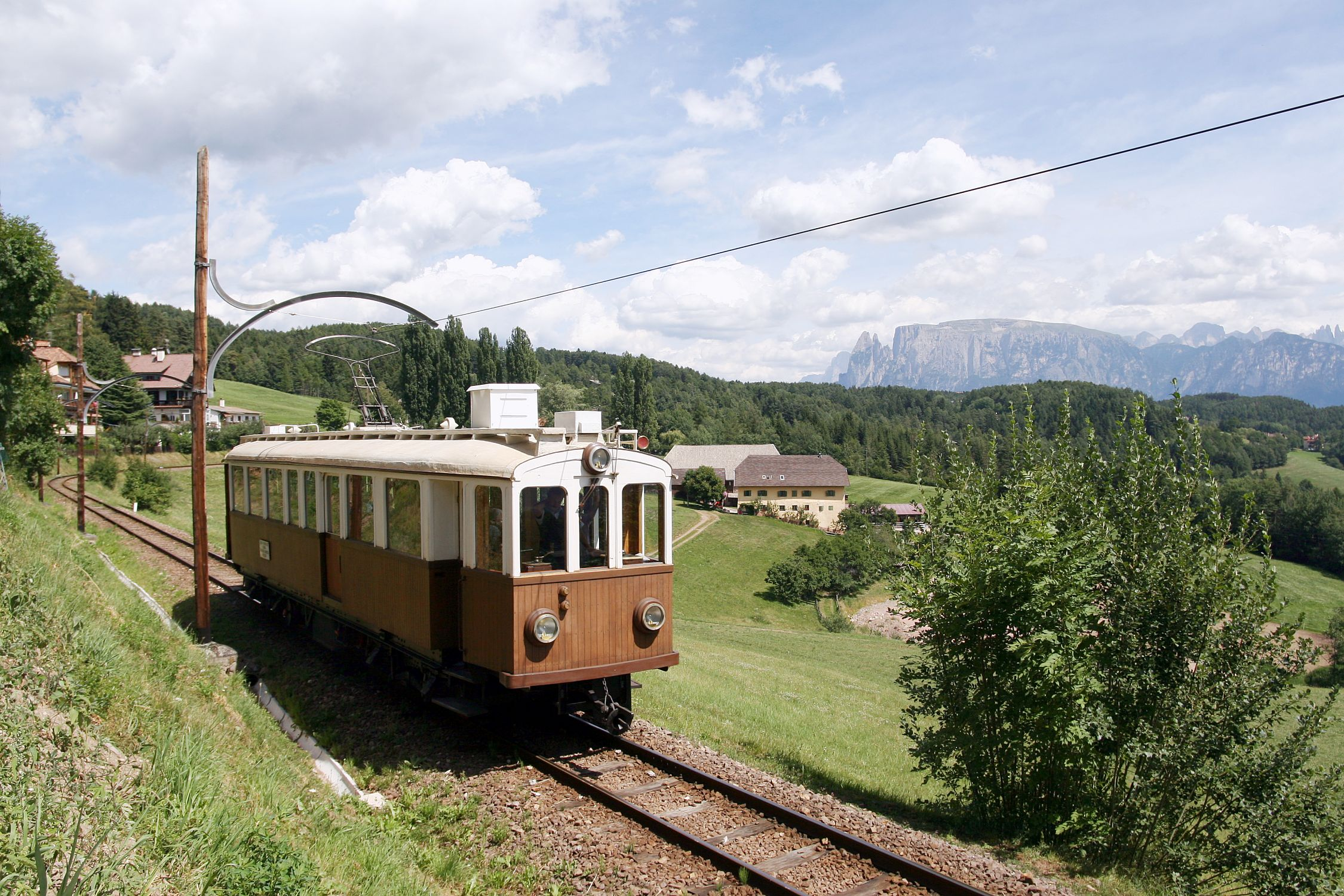

Overview
- Locale: Ritten plateau, near Bolzano, Italy
- Termini: Maria Himmelfahrt (since 1966); Klobenstein
- Stations: 5

Service
- Type: Passenger light railway, or rural tramway
- Operator(s): SAD

History
- Opened: August 13, 1907

Technical
- Line length: 6.6 km (4.1 mi)
- Track gauge: 1,000 mm (3 ft 3 3/8 in) metre gauge
- Electrification: 750 Volts DC, overhead lines
Route map

The Ritten Railway (German: Rittnerbahn or Rittner Bahn, Italian: Ferrovia del Renon) is an electric light railway which originally connected Bolzano with the Ritten plateau and today continues to operate on the plateau, connecting the villages located there.

== Track ==
When opened in 1907 the line started as a tramway at Walther Square in the center of Bolzano, where it shared the track with the Bolzano town tramways as far as the Brenner Road. From there to Maria Himmelfahrt the line was a rack railway, climbing 990 metres (3,250 ft) until it reached the plateau. A special rack locomotive was placed behind the trams to push them uphill. In the middle of this ascent was a crossing loop so that two trains could cross. The train that went down to Bolzano produced some of the power that was needed to get the other train up. After arriving in Maria Himmelfahrt on the Ritten plateau, the locomotive was uncoupled and the trams were able to proceed unaided on normal tracks to the terminal station in the village of Klobenstein.

== History ==
In the 19th century the Ritten plateau was a popular place for the people of Bolzano, who liked to pass their weekends there. To connect the two places, it was decided to build a rack railway, and in 1906 the railway engineer Josef Riehl commenced the planning of the line. In April 1907 construction was finished, and the railway was officially inaugurated on 13 August 1907. The full length of the line, from Walterplatz in Bolzano to Klobenstein, was 11.75 km (7.3 mi).

In the 1960s a road was built between Bolzano and Ritten, and after that the railway was nearly abandoned and maintenance reduced. A decision was taken to replace the rack railway with an aerial cable car. Shortly before the cableway was opened a train derailed on the rack railway and many people were seriously injured and some of them even killed. The likely cause was the sharply reduced maintenance. The rack section closed in 1966, leaving in operation the section from Maria Himmelfahrt to Klobenstein, which still operates today. It was fully renovated in 1985.

A new tricable gondola lift with eight gondolas, that can carry 550 persons per hour, opened on 23 May 2009.

== Today ==
The remaining line is used by tourists, locals and railway enthusiasts. The company that currently operates the line is the same company that runs all the buses in the province and also the Vinschgerbahn in the Vinschgau valley.

Most trips serve only the section between Klobenstein (Collalbo in Italian) and Oberbozen (Soprabolzano; Upper Bolzano in English), a distance of 5.5 km (3.4 mi). Only three or four trips per day serve the 1.1 km (0.7 mi) section between Oberbozen and Maria Himmelfahrt. Although South Tyrol has been part of Italy since 1919, local places (such as Klobenstein) are more commonly referred to by their German-language names than by their Italian ones, because the majority of the population speaks primarily German (about 69%).

== Rolling stock ==
In 1982, used tramcars, built in 1958, were bought from the Esslingen–Nellingen–Denkendorf Tramway in Esslingen, Germany, which had closed in 1978, to replace some of the oldest cars and to allow longer maintenance stays for the historic cars. Two motor trams (Nos. 12-13) and two trailers (36–37) were acquired, but only car 12 ever entered service on the Rittnerbahn—and not until 1992.

Today, some of the original ones are at the Tiroler Museumsbahnen museum in Innsbruck. In spring 2009, two slightly newer, second-hand cars were added to the fleet with the purchase of cars 21 and 24 (built in 1975 and 1977, respectively) from the Trogenerbahn^{DE} in St. Gallen, Switzerland.

== Gallery ==
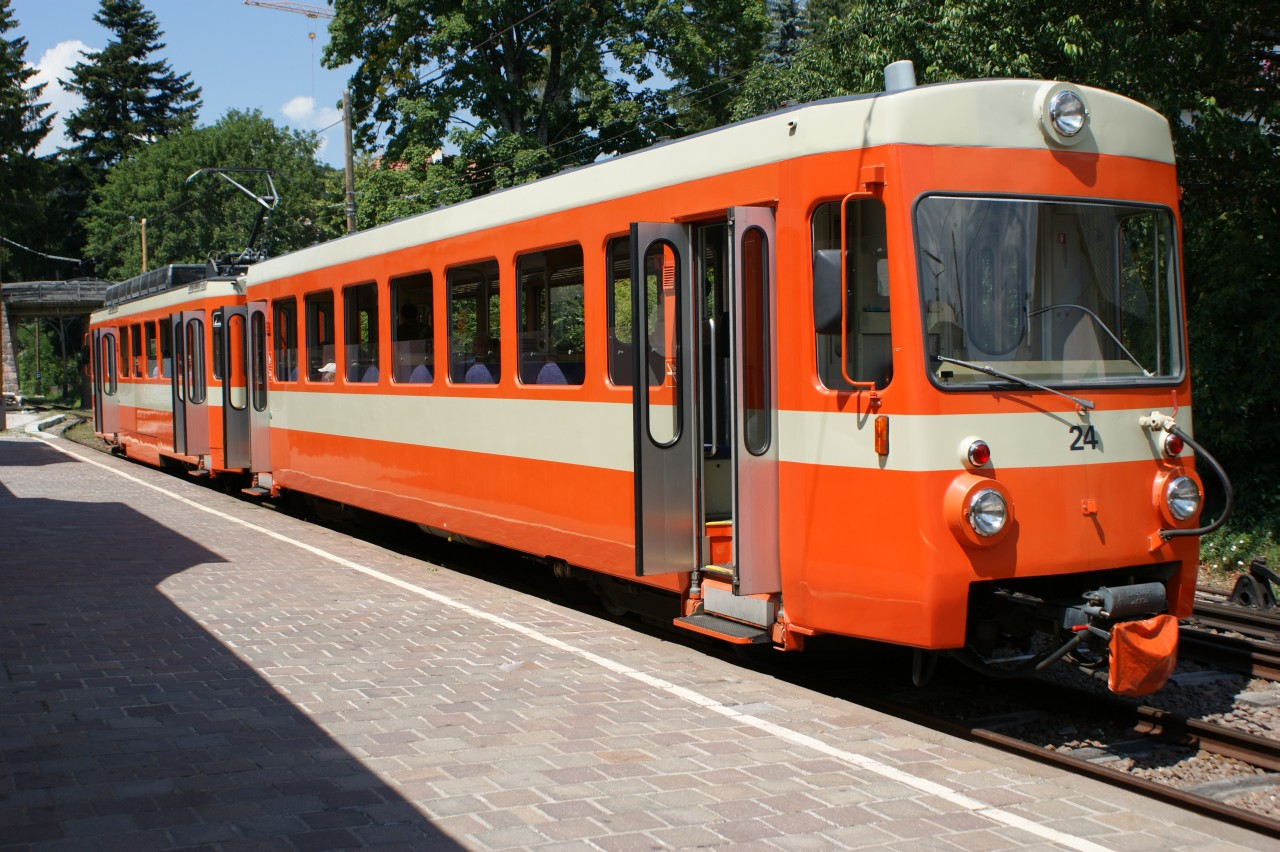
Ex-St. Gallen (Trogener-bahn) twinset 24 at Klobenstein/Collalbo in 2010

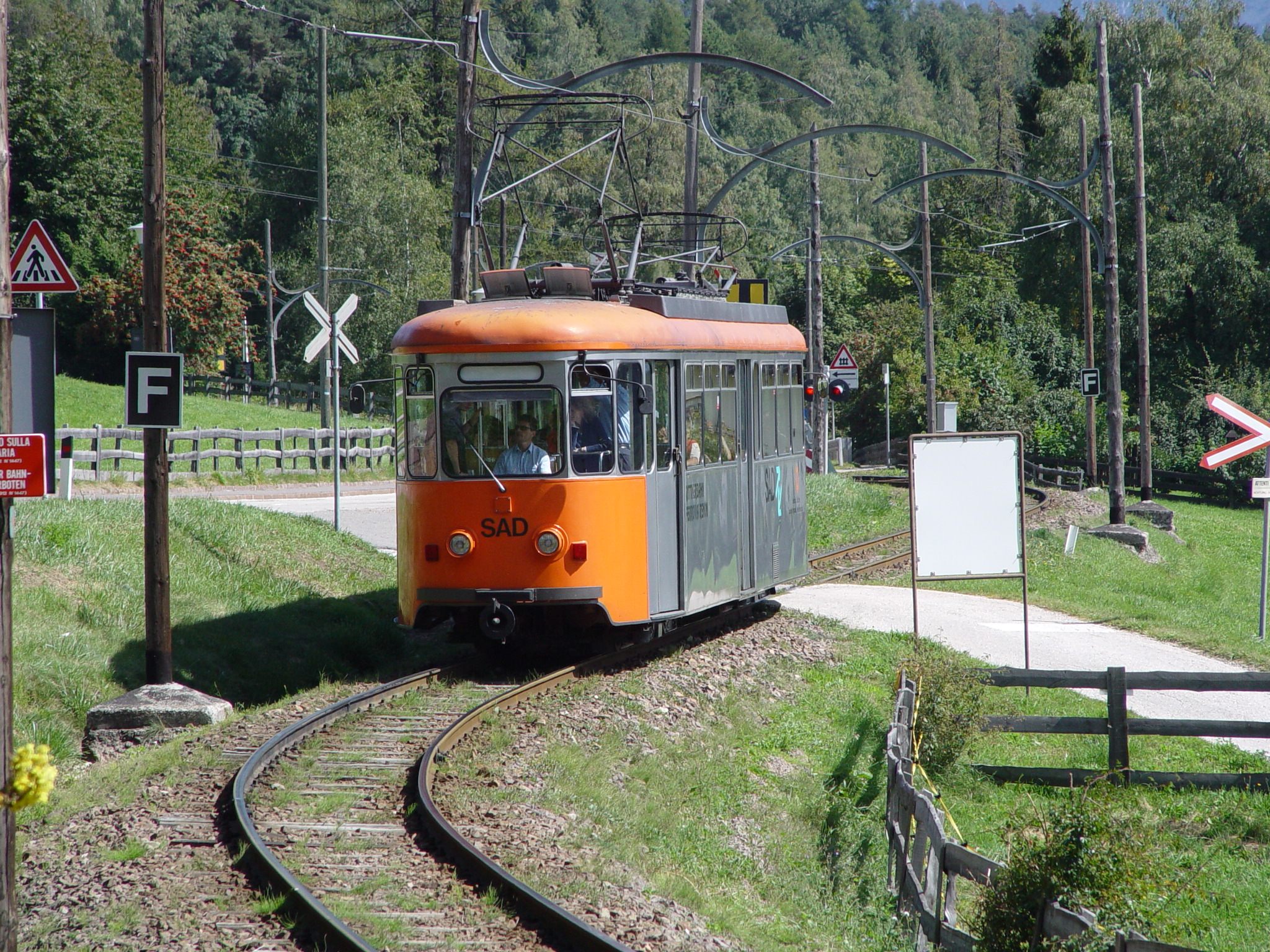
Ex-Esslingen tram on the Rittnerbahn in 2006

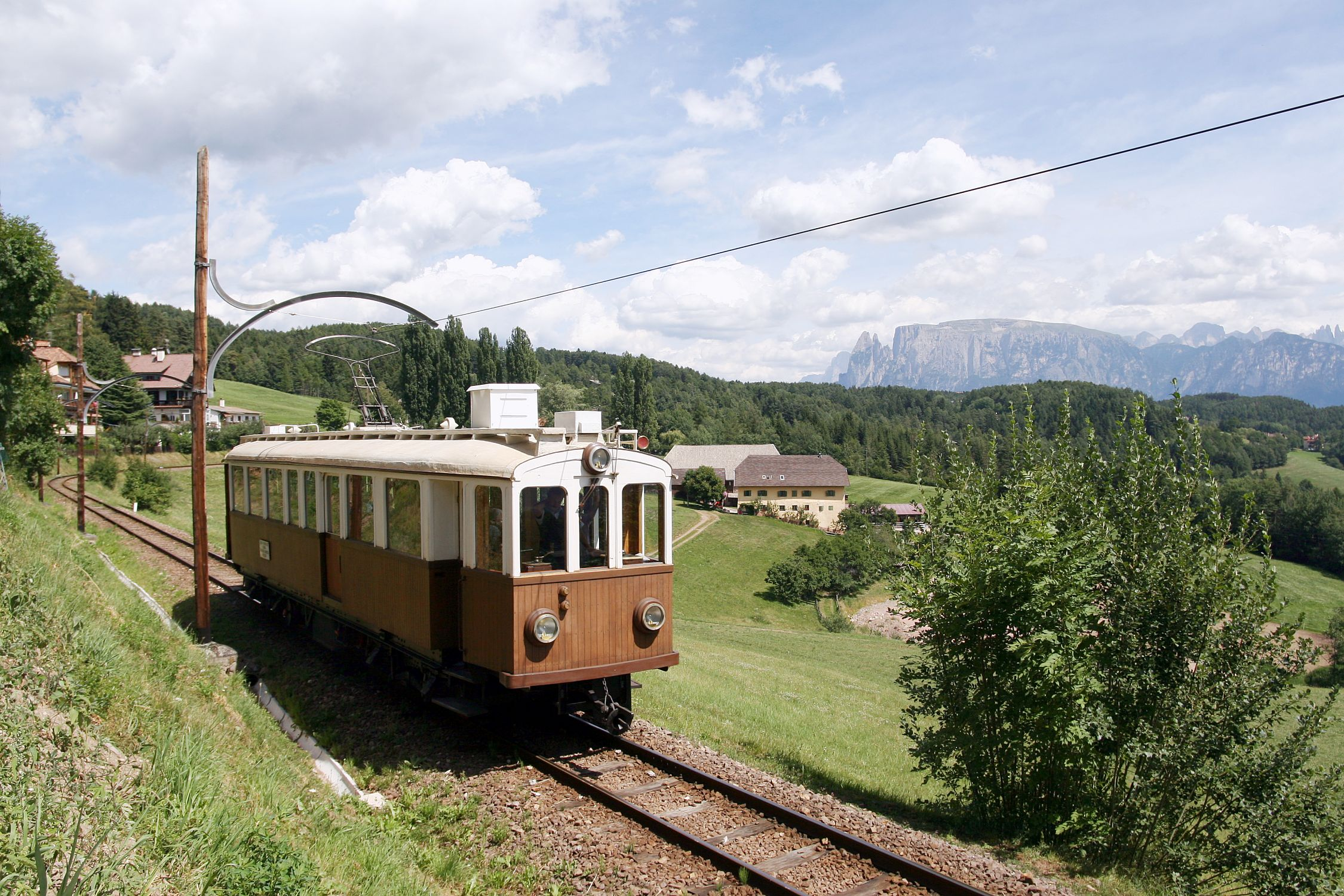
On the line

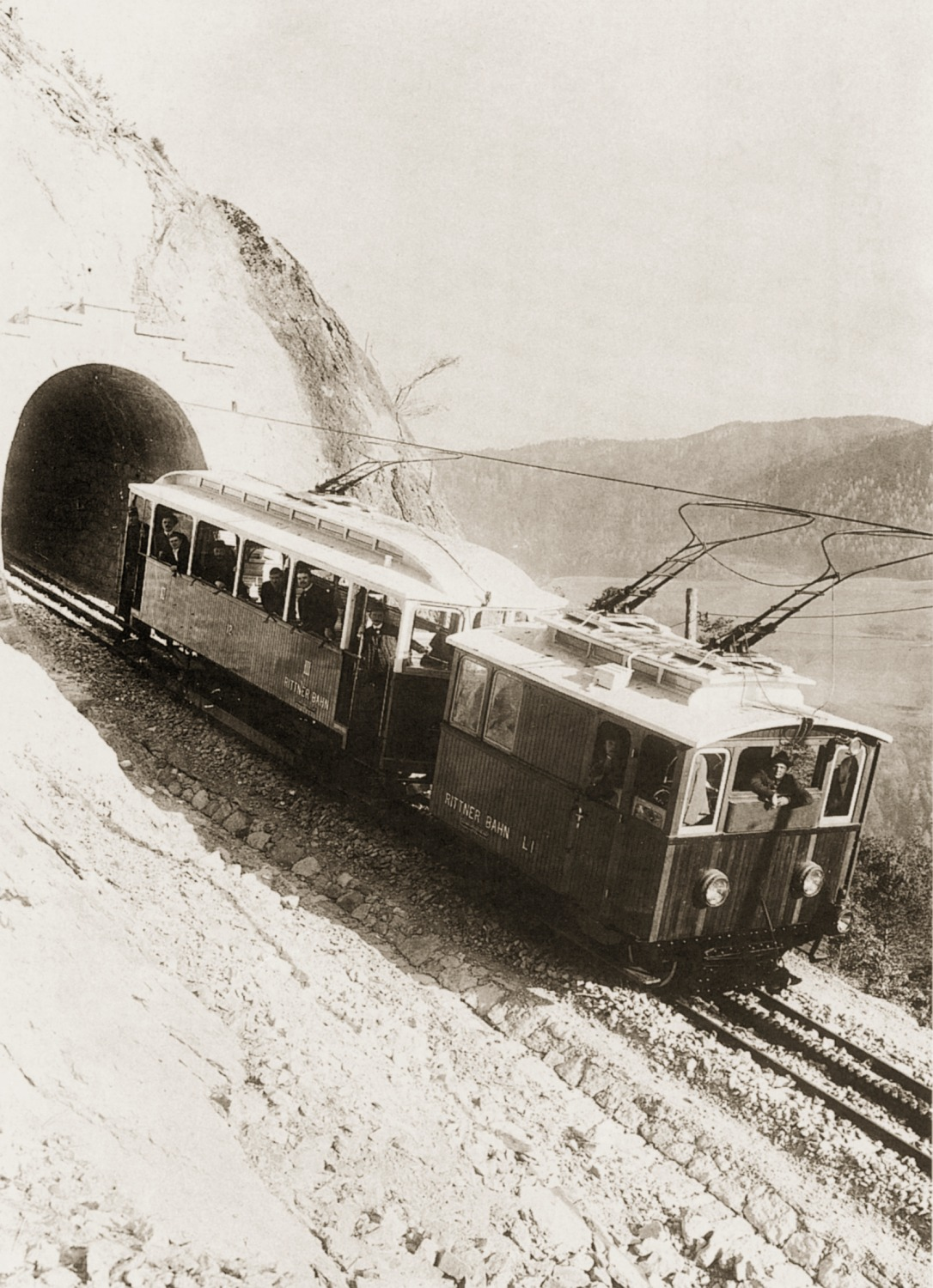
Old rack railway

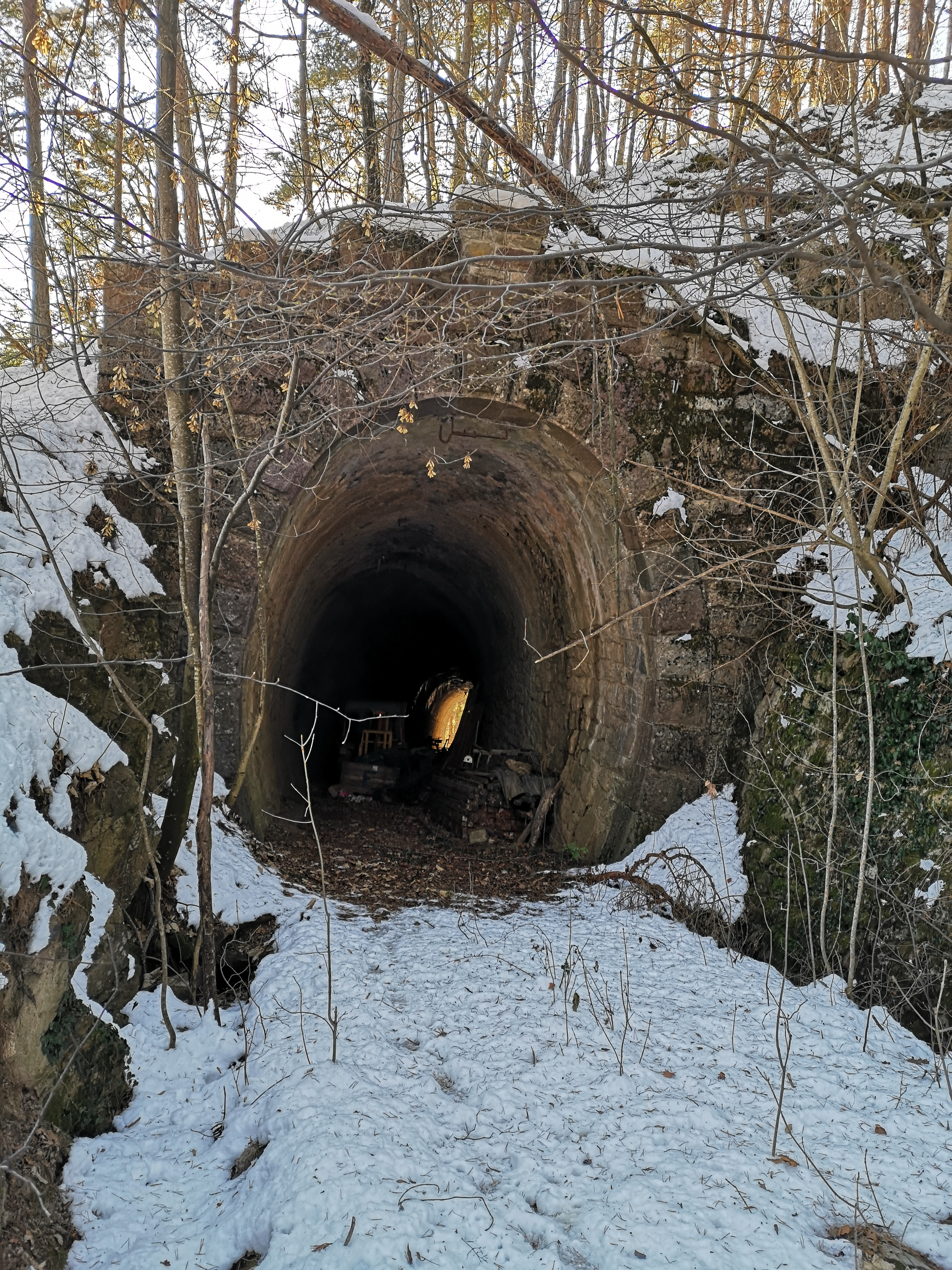
Abandoned tunnel on the closed section of the line

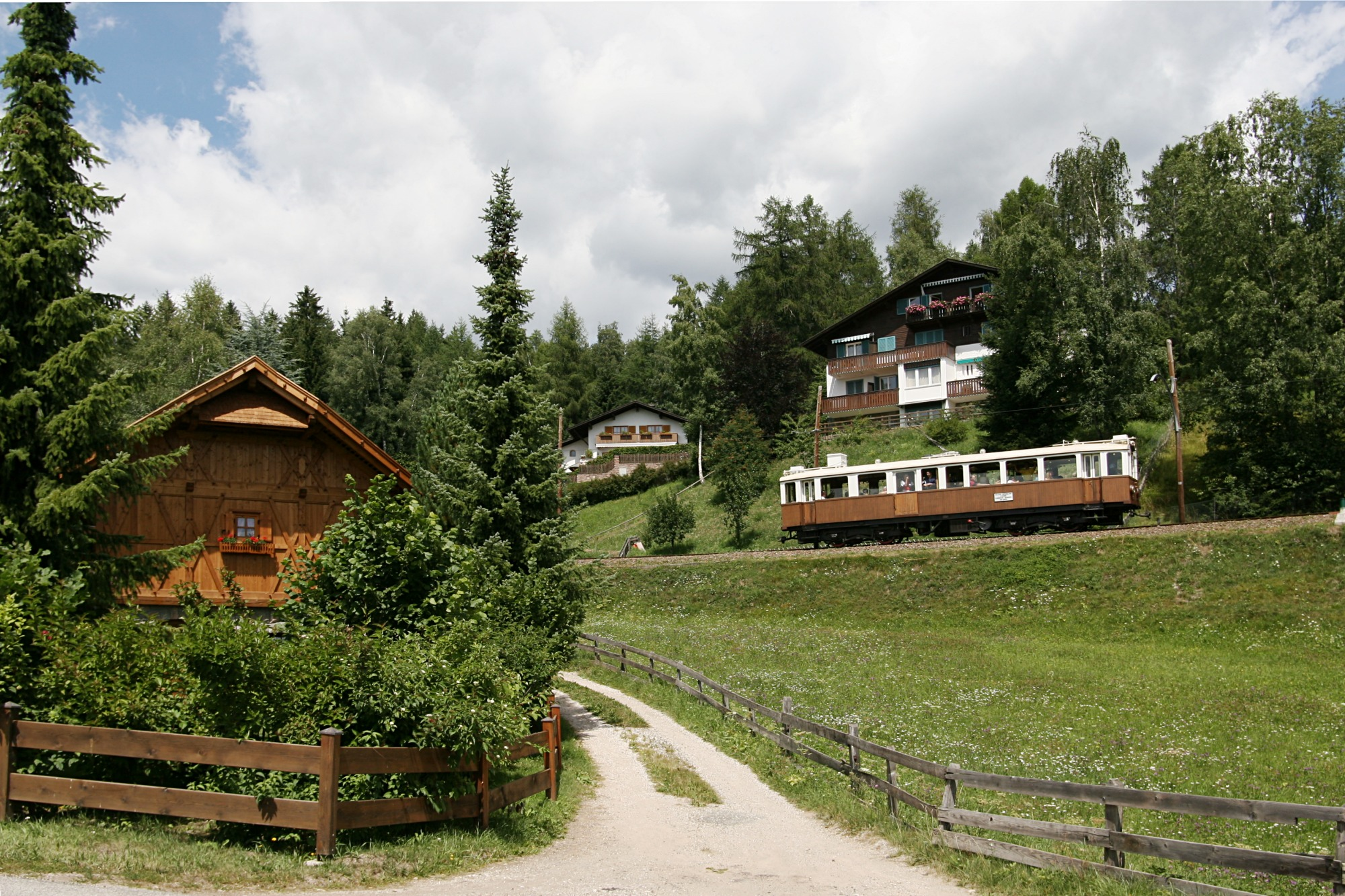

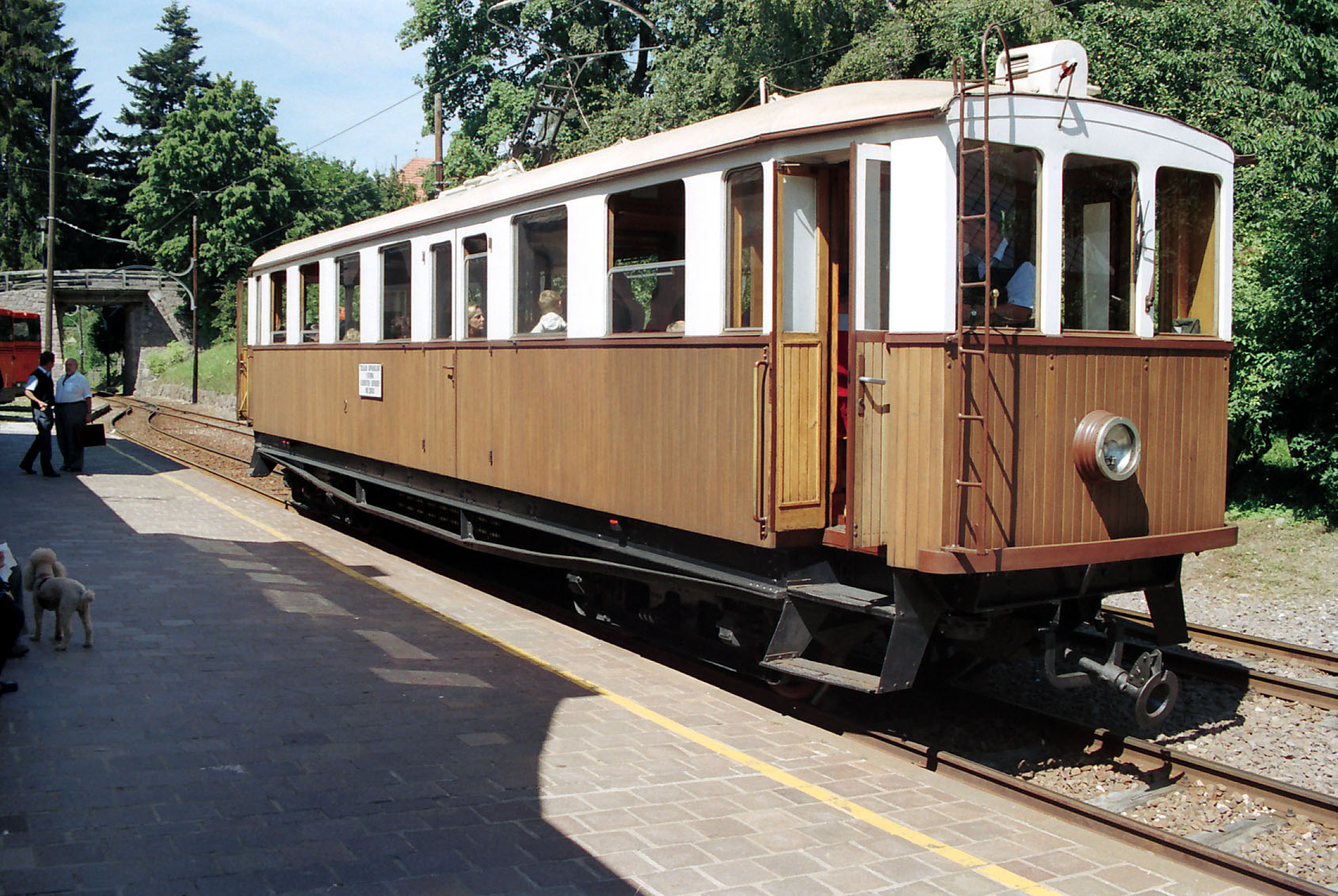
Four-axle car

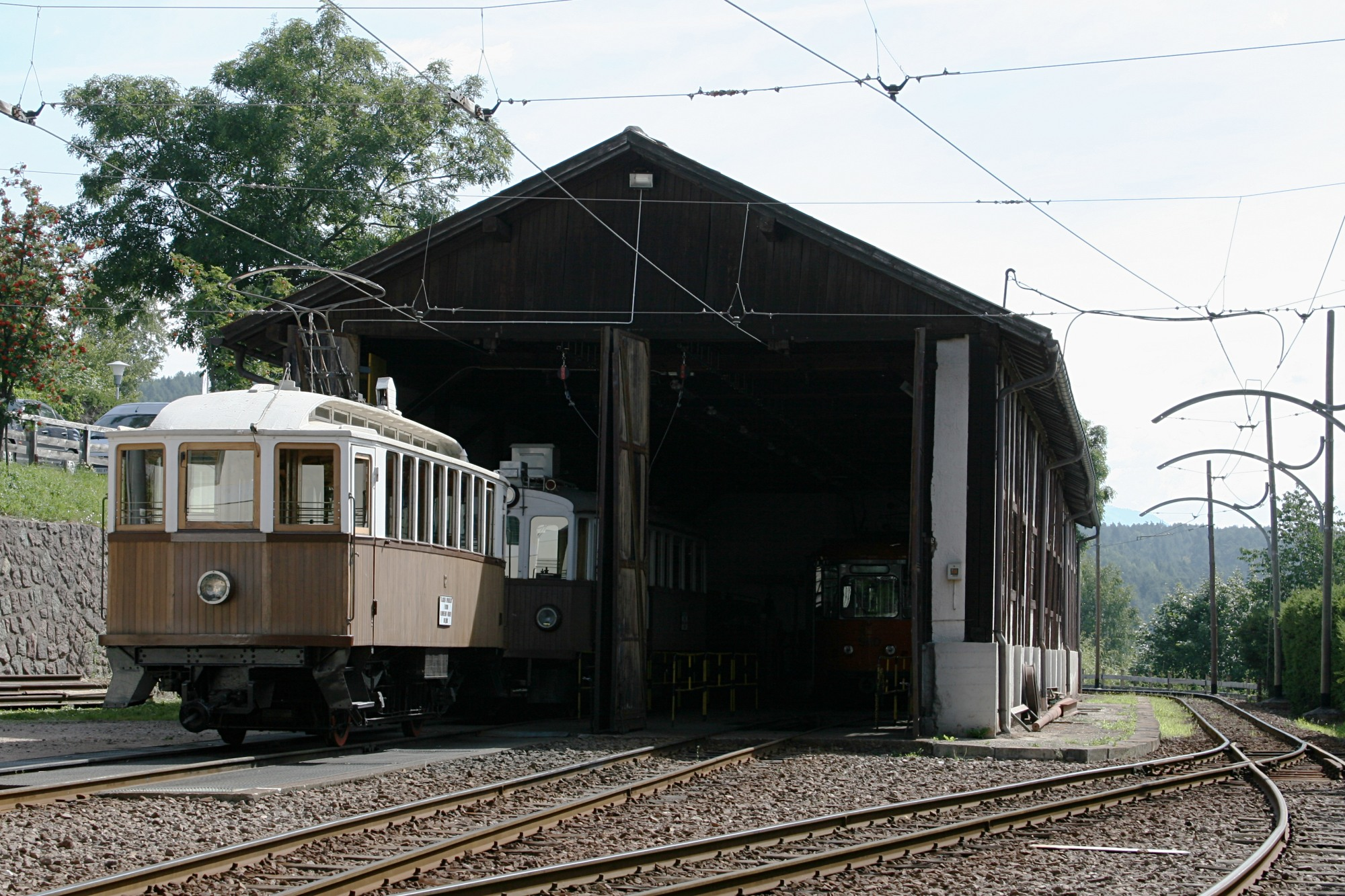

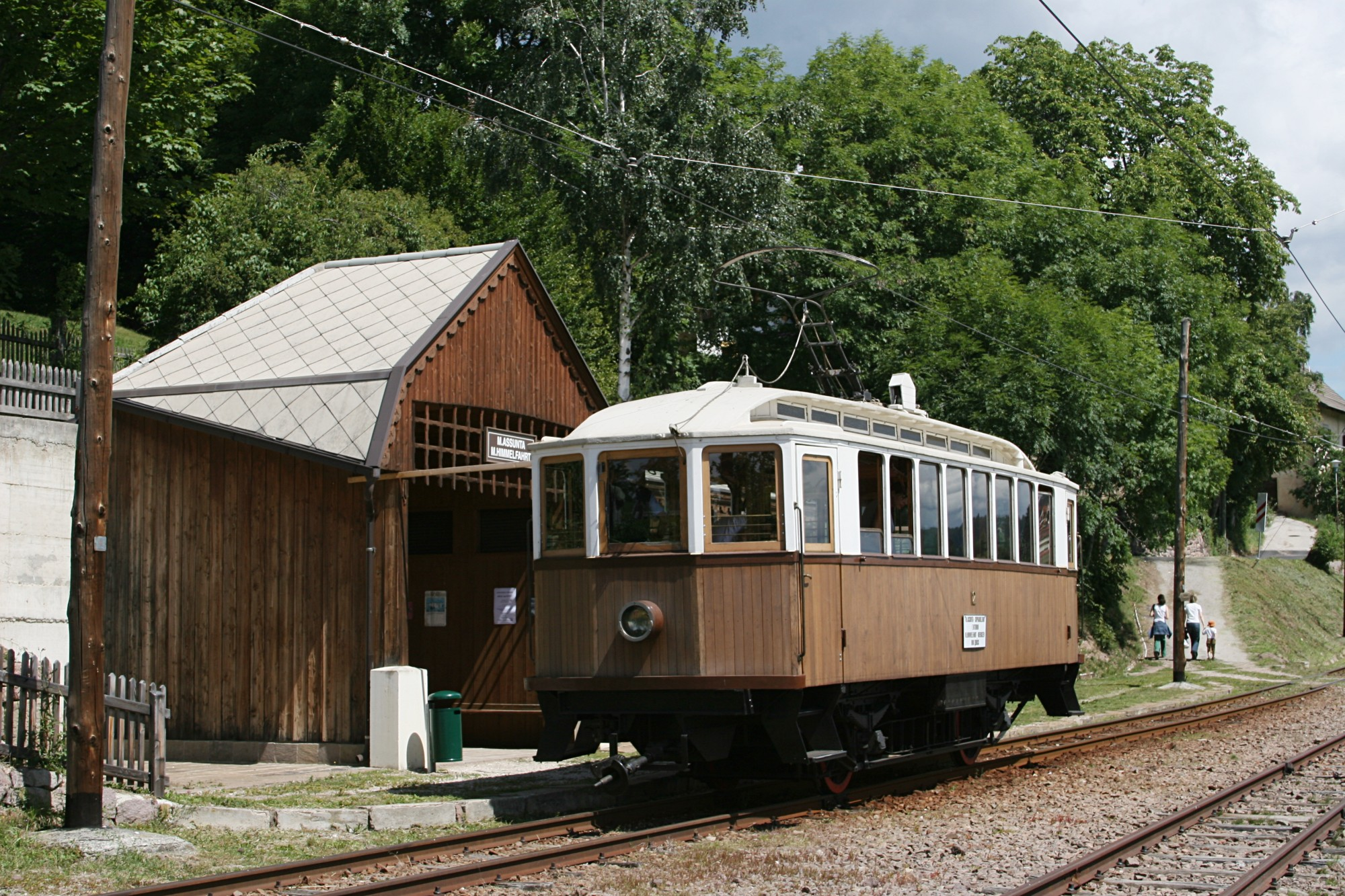

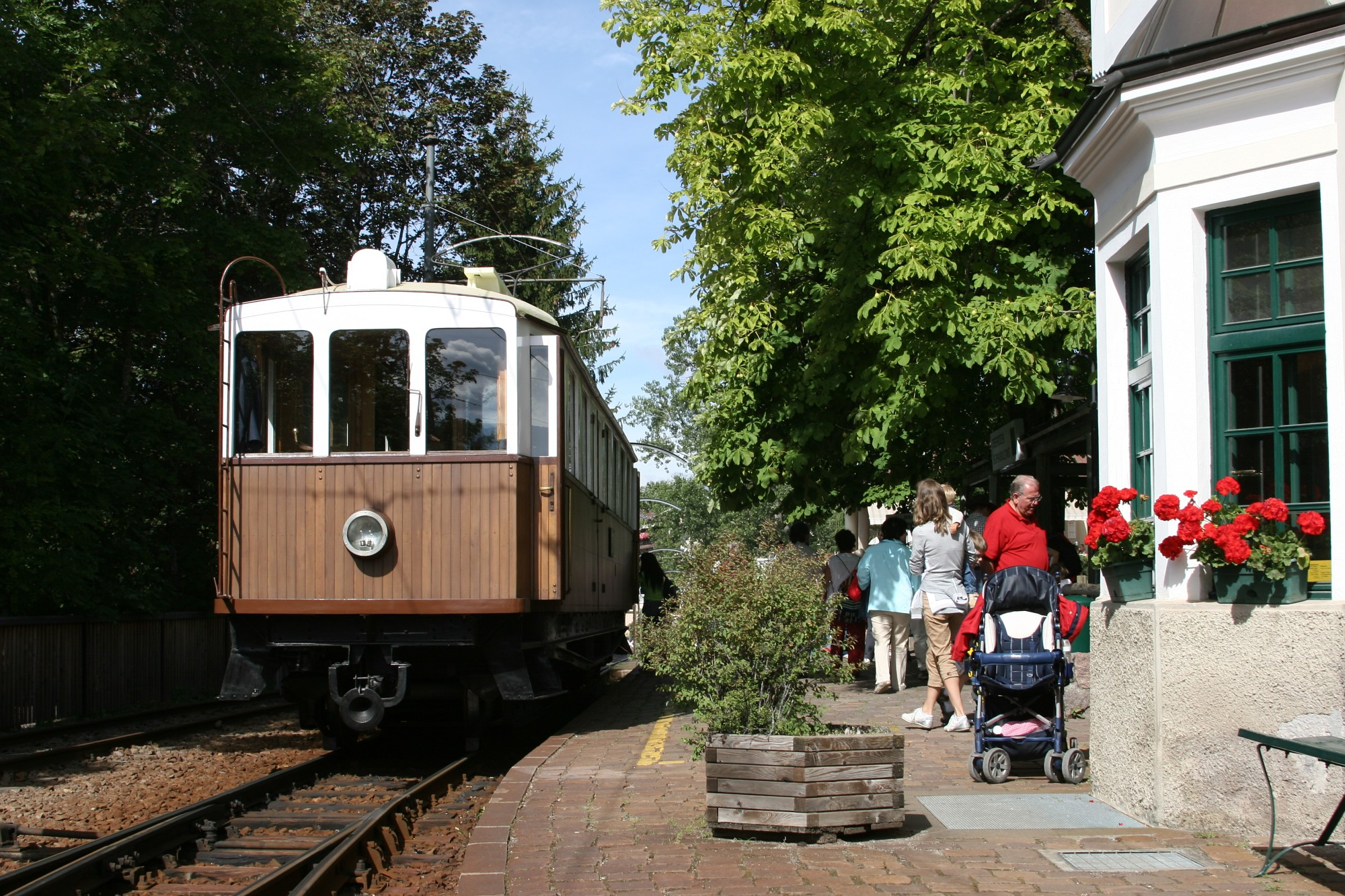

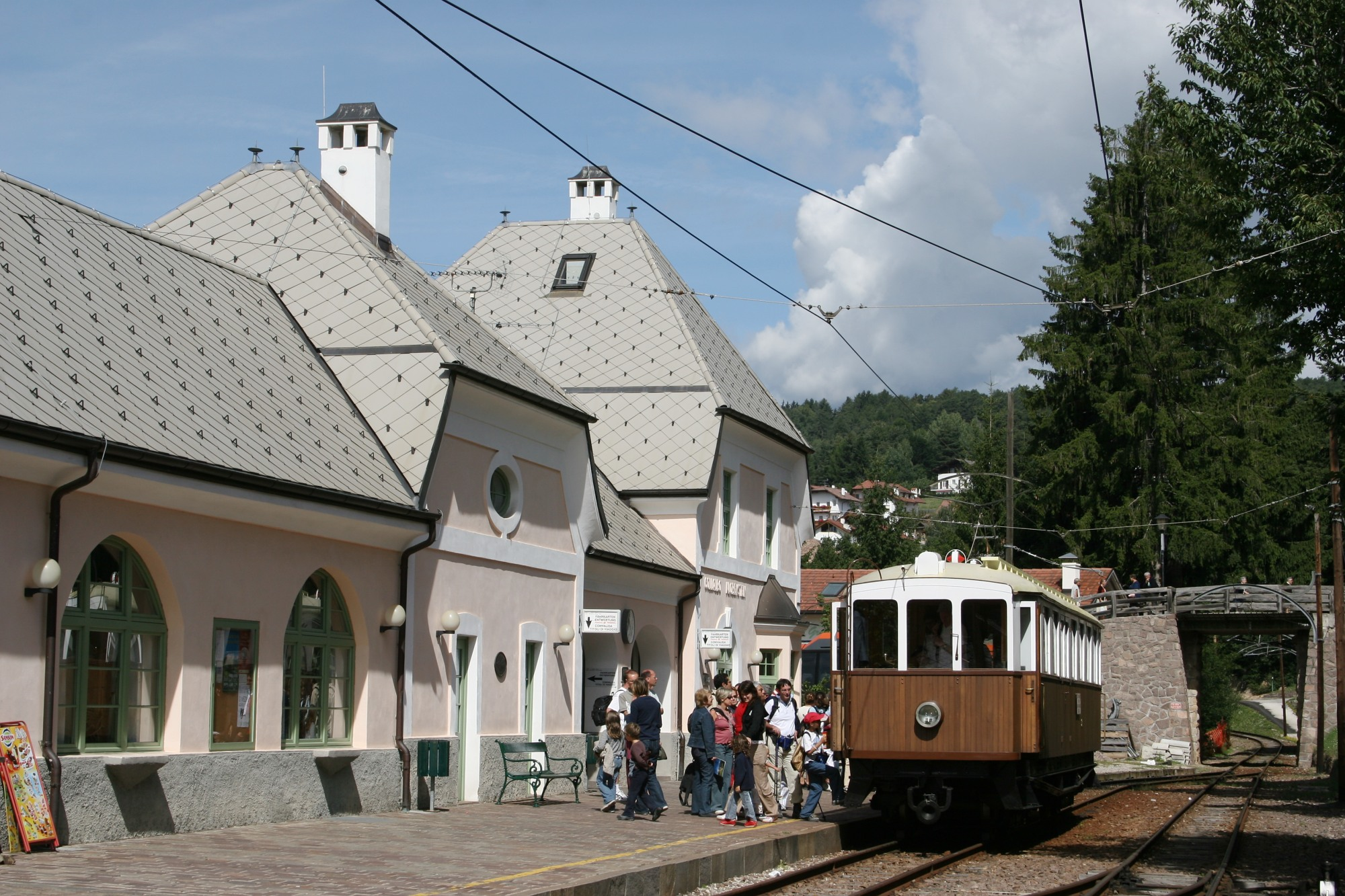
Klobenstein station

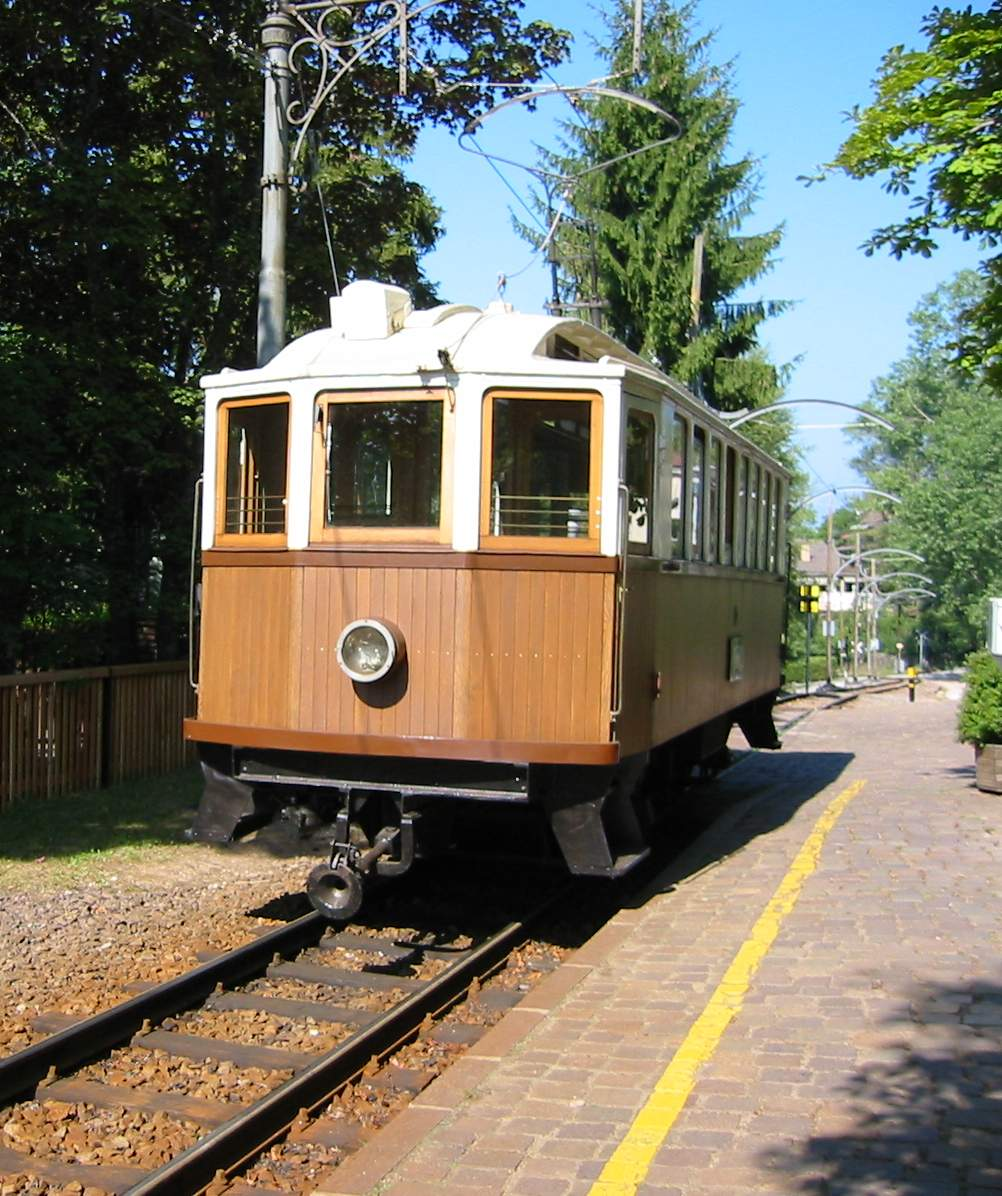
Two-axle car

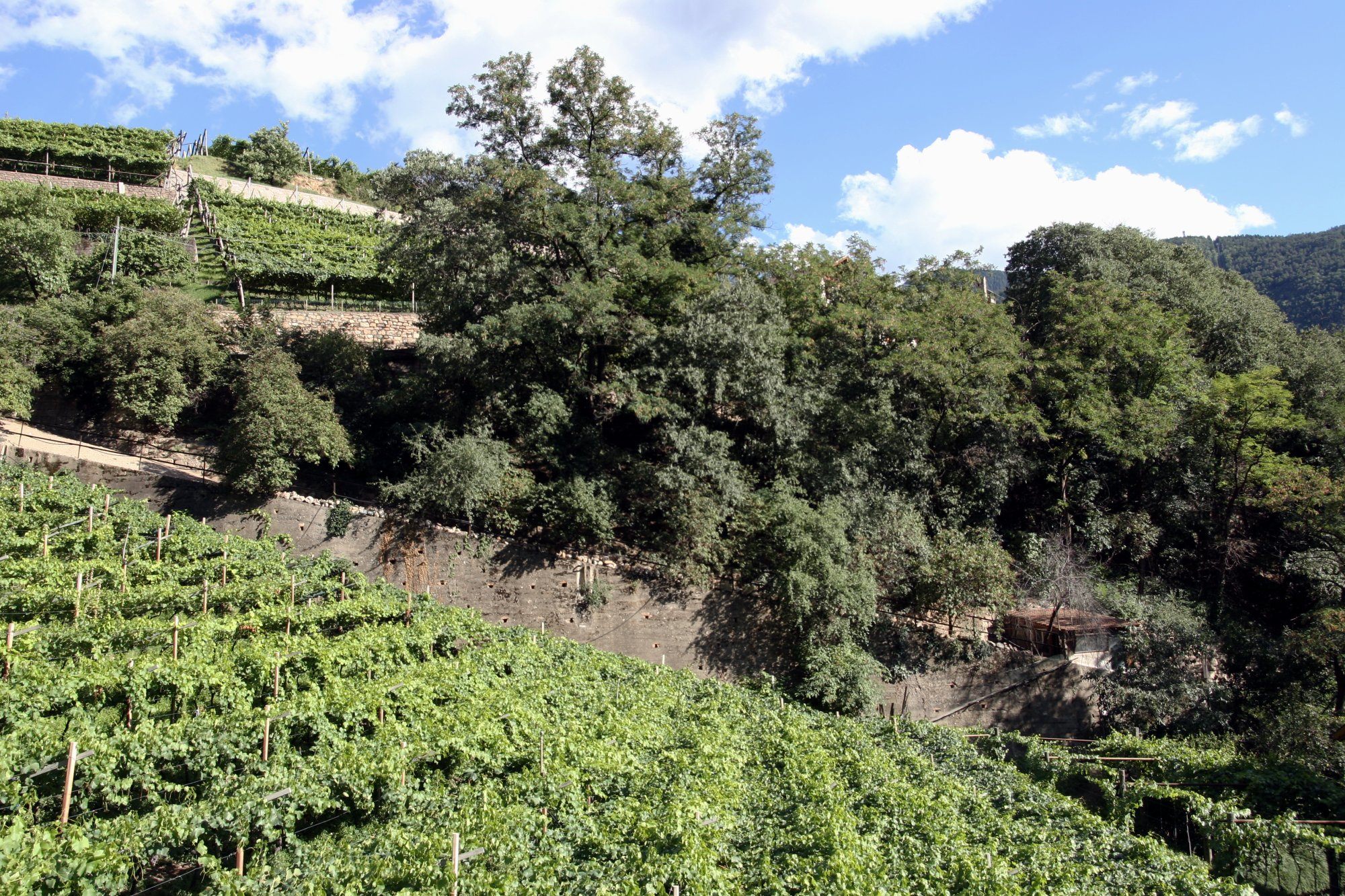
Abandoned rack railway

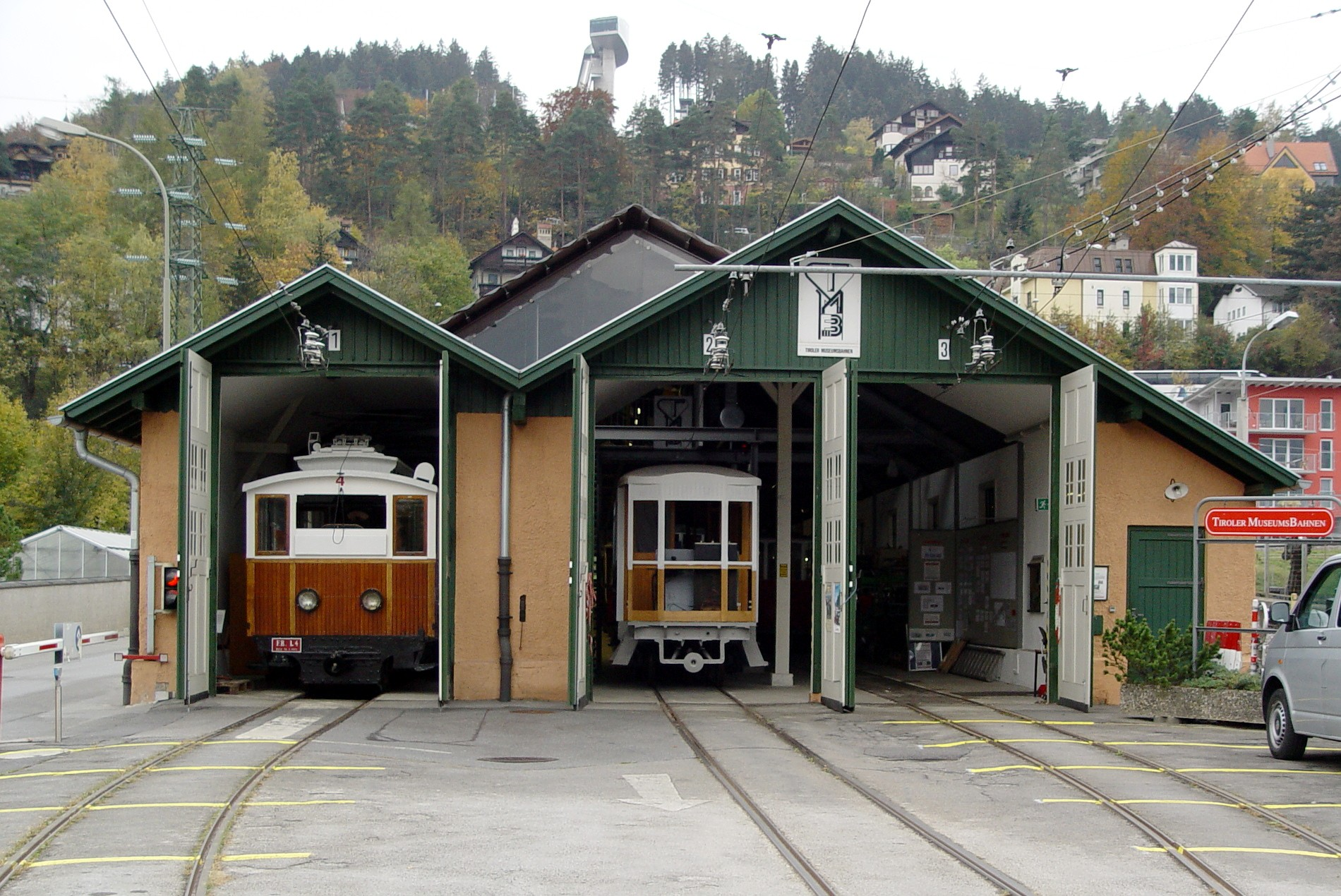
Engine shed of the Tiroler Museumsbahnen in Innsbruck

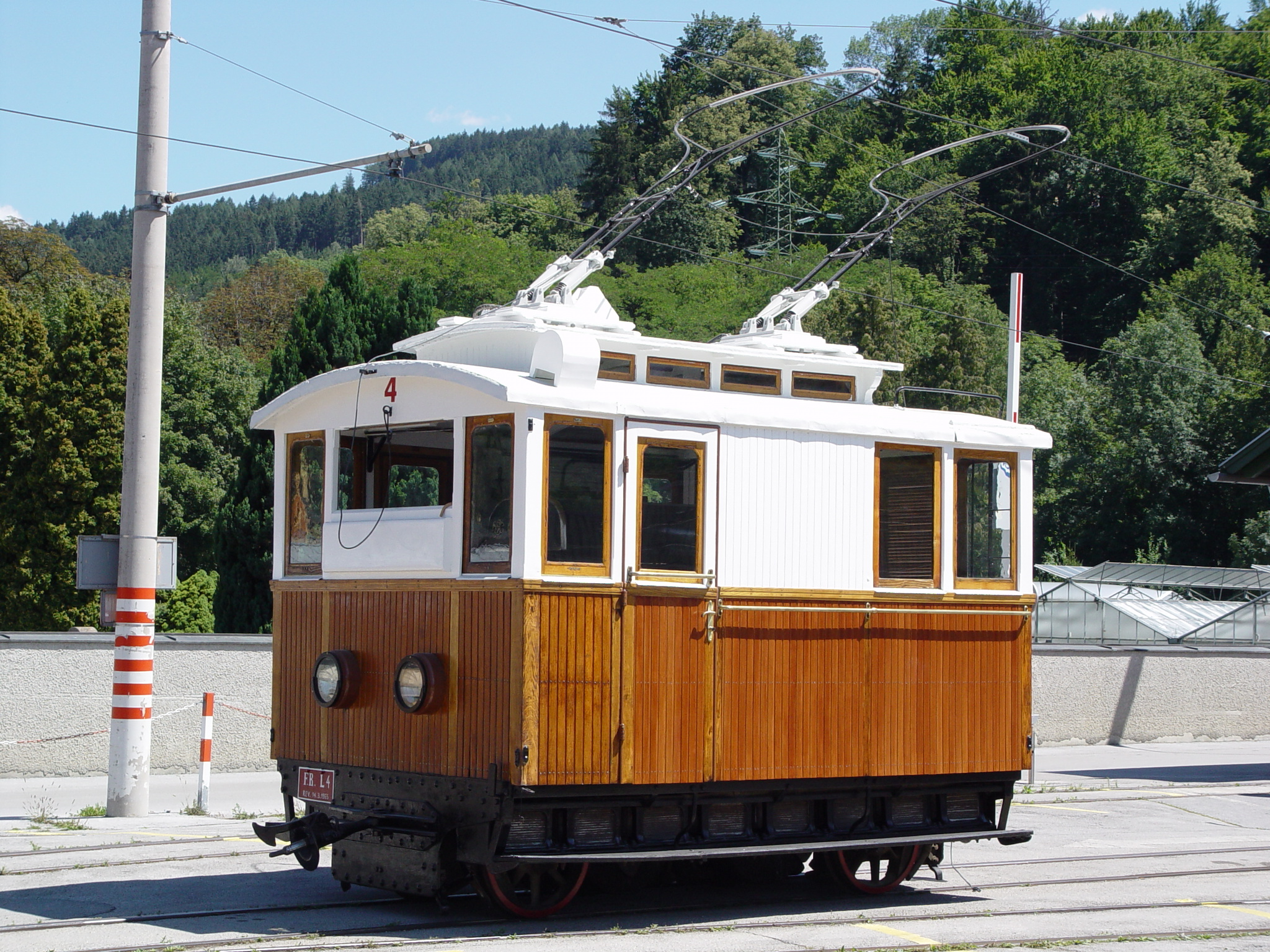
Rittnerbahn rack-railway locomotive preserved by the Tiroler Museums-bahnen

== Literature ==
- Josef Dultinger: Vergessene Vergangenheit. Verlag Dr. Rudolf Erhard, Rum 1982
- Josef Dultinger: Auf schmaler Spur durch Südtirol. Verlag Dr. Rudolf Erhard, Rum 1982
- Astrid von Aufschnaiter (1982). Der Ritten und seine Bahn. Bozen/Bolzano: Rittner-Bahn Komitee.

== See also ==
- List of highest railways in Europe
