= Civic Archives in Bozen-Bolzano =

- Stadtarchiv Bozen (German); Archivio Storico della Città di Bolzano (Italian)
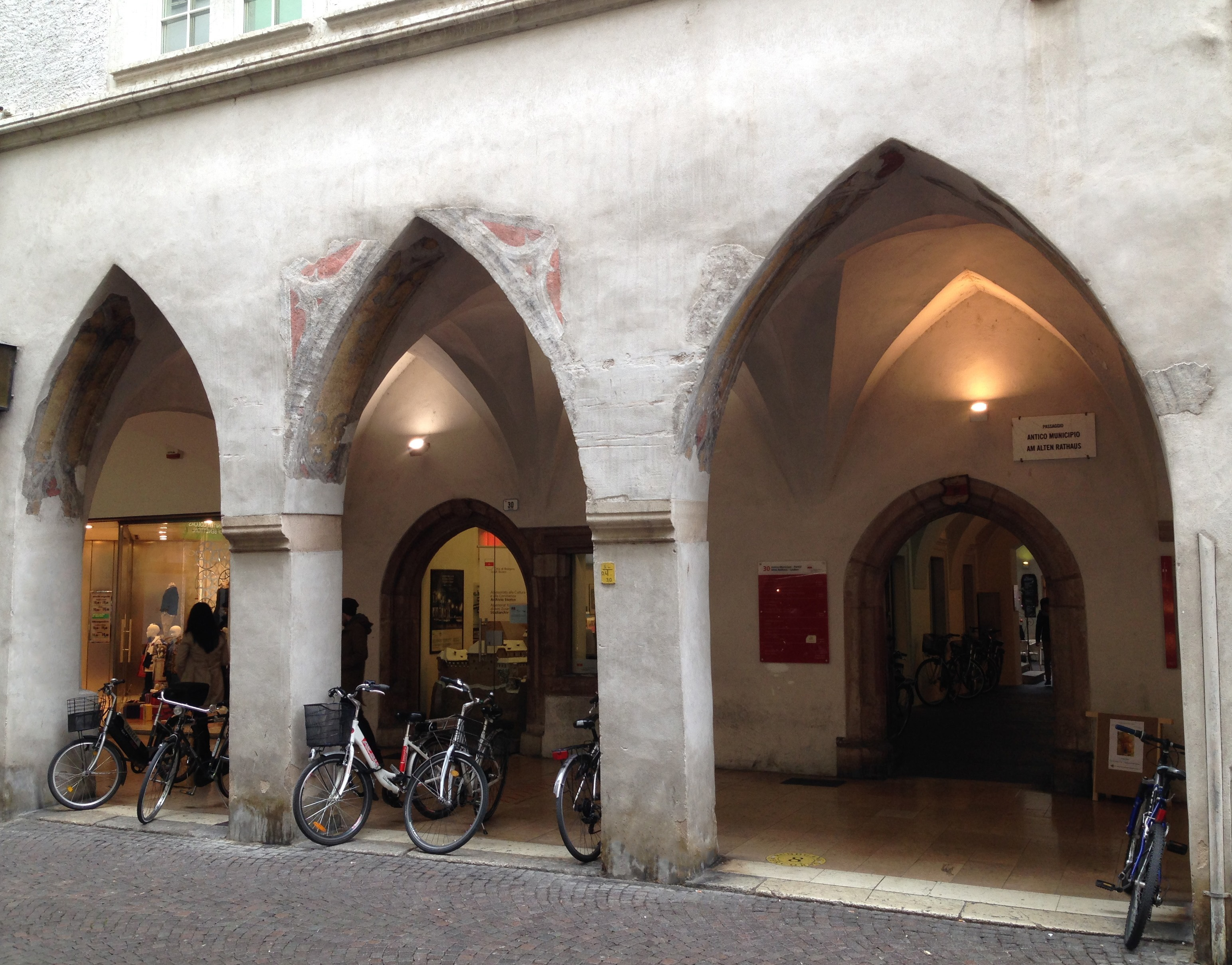
- Access from the Lauben thoroughfare
- Interactive map of Civic Archives in Bozen-Bolzano
- 46°30′N 11°21′E
- Location: Bozen-Bolzano, South Tyrol, Italy

History
- Built: 1455

Site notes
- Governing body: City of Bolzano
- Website: http://stadtarchiv-archiviostorico.gemeinde.bozen.it

The Civic Archives in Bozen-Bolzano (German: Stadtarchiv Bozen; Italian: Archivio Storico della Città di Bolzano) is the municipal archive of the city of Bolzano in South Tyrol, Italy. It is located in the old town hall and stores documents from over 700 years of civic and regional history.

== History ==
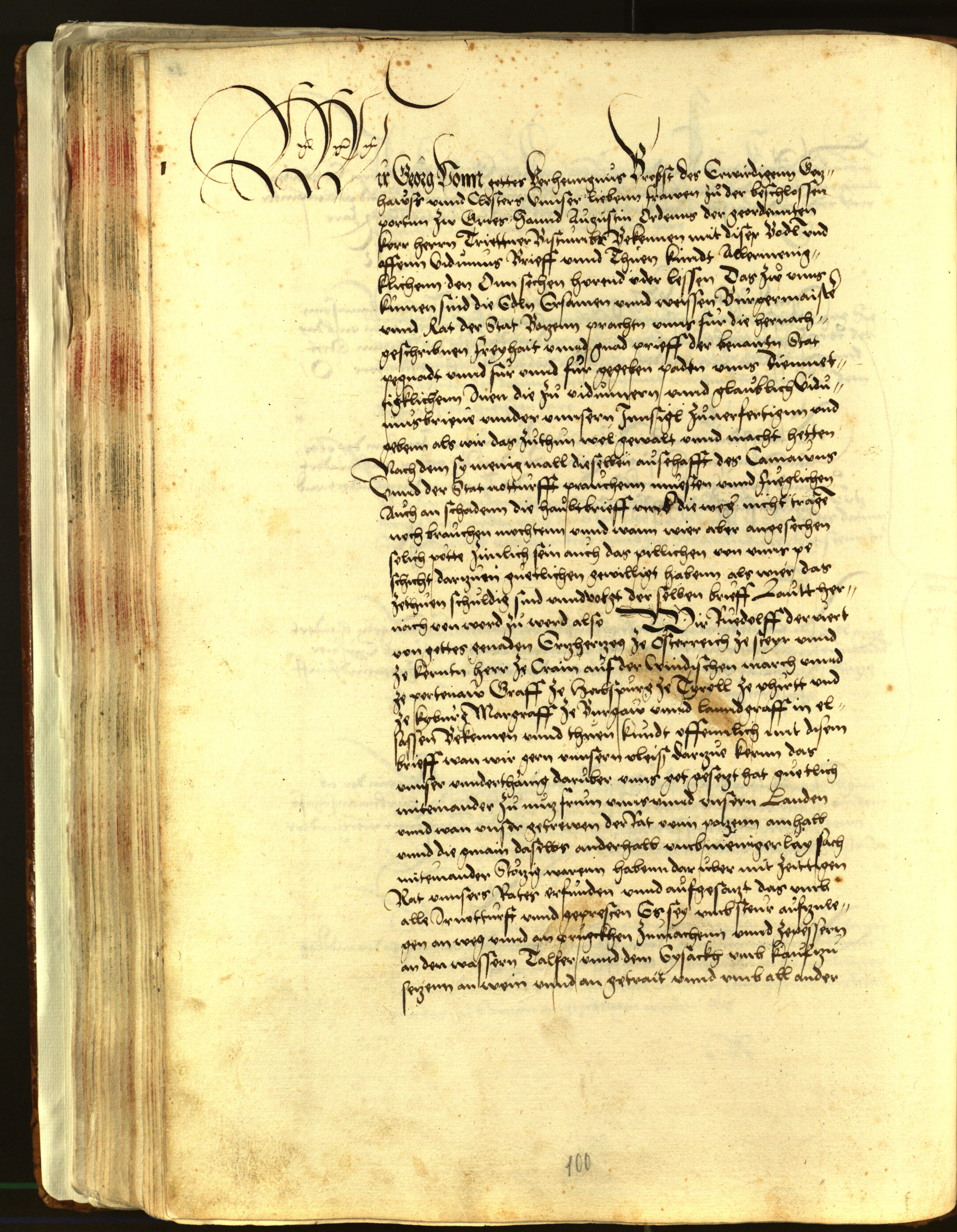
The so called Stadtbuch dating back to 1472—1525, fol. 76v, recording a civic privilege from 1363 granted by Rudolf IV, Duke of Austria

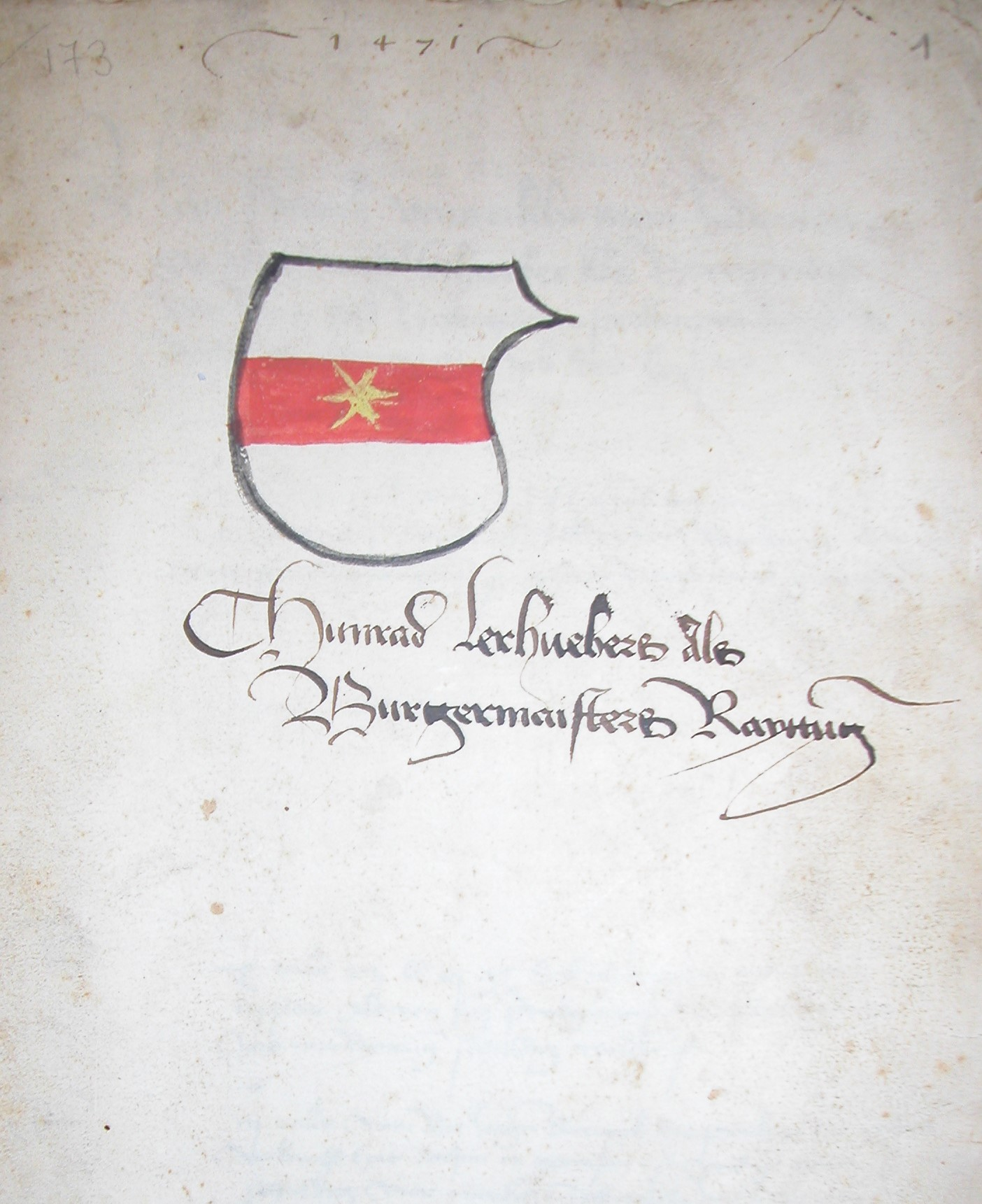
The town's coat of arms as it appears in the Civic accountings of 1471 (Hs. 173), written by the mayor Konrad Lerhueber

The records of the Civic Archives and their language reflect the complex and rich History of the Alps and especially the History of South Tyrol, being the oldest documentation from the late 13th century onwards written exclusively in Latin and German. Only from the annexation of the Southern Tyrol after World War I by Italy in 1919/20 onwards, the records are mainly kept in Italian.

The first mentions about the Bolzano records keeping are dating back to the late XV century. In 1472 the burgermeister Konrad Lerhueber instituted the so called Stadtbuch as the towns official register of legal acts.

In 1776 the civic council, on behalf of the burgermeister Franz von Gumer, decided to gather the municipal records within the old town hall and ordered the civic scrivener Johann Felix Gigl to collect the archives.

As in 1907 the municipality moved to Bolzano's new town hall, the historic documents were transferred to the Civic Museum and recorded by the Austrian historian and archivist Karl Klaar who made an inventory still valid today. In 2002 the whole documentation returned to the old town hall, in the meantime adapted as site of the historic archives.

== Holdings ==
Among the many documents preserved, of peculiar interest to the historic sciences are the archives of the former Hospital to the Holy Spirit (Heilig-Geist-Spital) existing from the late 13th to the 19th centuries. Also the archives of the former autonomous communities of Gries and Zwölfmalgreien (Dodiciville) are kept by the Civic Archives. The oldest document today existing is a fragment of Bede's Commentaries on Proverbs. There is also preserved an excerpt of the Middle High German Christherre-Chronik in a copy dating back to 14th century.

== Sources ==
- von Ottenthal, Emil; Redlich, Oswald (1912). Das Bozner Stadtarchiv [Archiv-Berichte aus Tirol IV] (PDF). Mittheilungen der 3. (Archiv-)Section der K.K. Central-Commission zur Erforschung und Erhaltung der Kunst- und Historischen Denkmale (in German). Vol. 7. Vienna-Leipzig: Braumüller. pp. 410–432.
- Obermair, Hannes (1994). "Das Stadtarchiv Bozen" (PDF). Der Schlern (in German). 68 (11): 669–672.
- Obermair, Hannes (2005). Bozen Süd – Bolzano Nord. Schriftlichkeit und urkundliche Überlieferung der Stadt Bozen bis 1500 [Scritturalità e documentazione archivistica della città di Bolzano fino al 1500] (PDF). Regesten der kommunalen Bestände (in German and Italian). Vol. 1. Bozen-Bolzano: Stadtgemeinde Bozen. ISBN 978-88-901870-0-1.
- Obermair, Hannes (2008). Bozen Süd – Bolzano Nord. Schriftlichkeit und urkundliche Überlieferung der Stadt Bozen bis 1500 [Scritturalità e documentazione archivistica della città di Bolzano fino al 1500] (PDF). Regesten der kommunalen Bestände (in German and Italian). Vol. 2. Bozen-Bolzano: Stadtgemeinde Bozen. ISBN 978-88-901870-1-8.
- Obermair, Hannes (2018), "Multiple Vergangenheiten – Sammeln für die Stadt? Das Bozener Stadtarchiv 3.0", in Philipp Tolloi (ed.), Archive in Südtirol: Geschichte und Perspektiven / Archivi in Provincia di Bolzano: storia e prospettive, Veröffentlichungen des Südtiroler Landesarchivs, vol. 45, Innsbruck: Universitätsverlag Wagner, pp. 211–24, ISBN 978-3-7030-0992-1
