= List of mayors of Trieste =

Mayor of Trieste
- Sindaco di Trieste

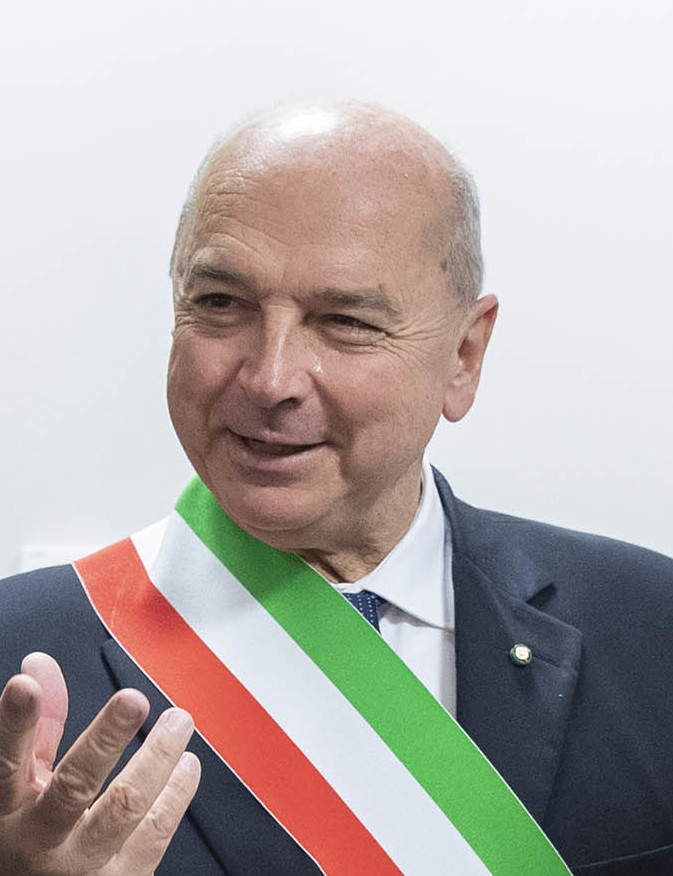
- Incumbent; Roberto Dipiazza since 18 October 2021
- Appointer: Electorate of Trieste
- Term length: 5 years, renewable once
- Formation: 1949

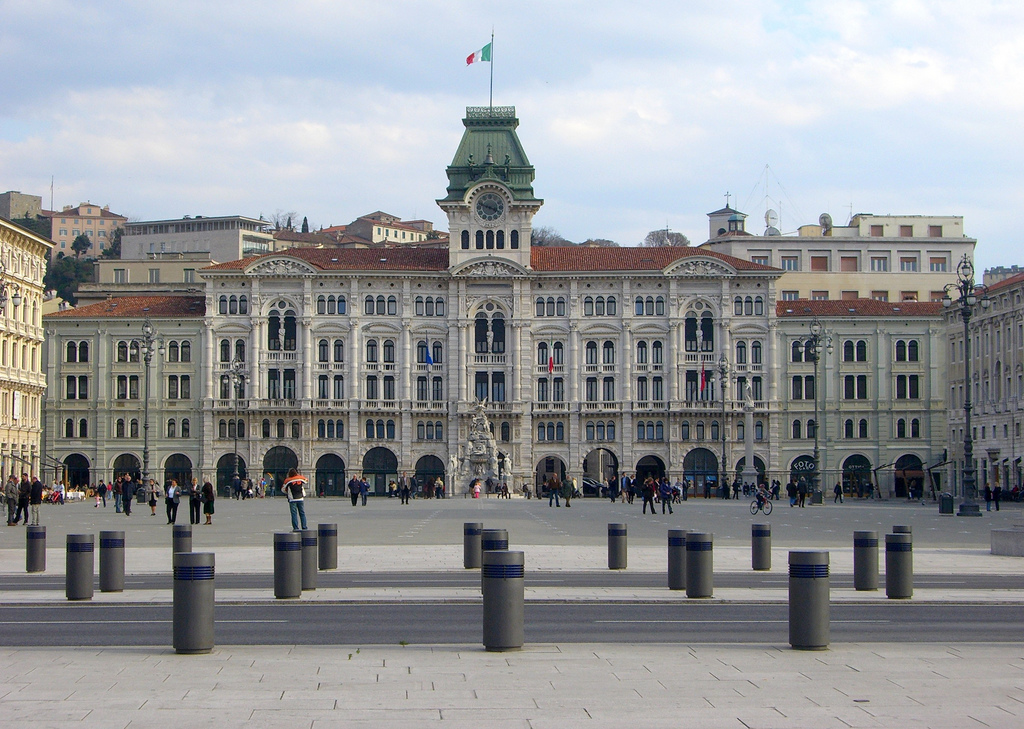
Trieste's City Hall

The mayor of Trieste (Italian: sindaco di Trieste) is an elected politician who, along with the Trieste's City Council, is accountable for the strategic government of Trieste, Friuli-Venezia Giulia, Italy.

The current mayor is Roberto Dipiazza, a member of the centre-right party Forza Italia, who took office on 20 June 2016.

== Overview ==
According to the Italian Constitution, the Mayor of Trieste is member of the City Council.

The Mayor is elected by the population of Trieste, who also elect the members of the City Council, controlling the Mayor's policy guidelines and is able to enforce his resignation by a motion of no confidence. The Mayor is entitled to appoint and release the members of his government.

Since 1993 the Mayor is elected directly by Trieste's electorate: in all mayoral elections in Italy in cities with a population higher than 15,000 the voters express a direct choice for the mayor or an indirect choice voting for the party of the candidate's coalition. If no candidate receives at least 50% of votes, the top two candidates go to a second round after two weeks. The election of the City Council is based on a direct choice for the candidate with a preference vote: the candidate with the majority of the preferences is elected. The number of the seats for each party is determined proportionally.

== Republic of Italy (since 1949) ==
=== City Council election (1949-1993) ===
From 1949 to 1993, the Mayor of Trieste was elected by the City Council.

	Mayor	Term start	Term end	Party
1	Gianni Bartoli	1949	1957	DC
2	Mario Franzil	1958	1967	DC
3	Marcello Spaccini	1967	1978	DC
4	Manlio Cecovini	1978	1983	LpT
5	Deo Rossi	1983	1983	LpT
6	Franco Richetti	1983	1986	DC
7	Arduino Agnelli	1986	1986	PSI
8	Giulio Staffieri	1986	1988	LpT
(6)	Franco Richetti	1988	1991	DC
(8)	Giulio Staffieri	1992	1993	LpT

=== Direct election (since 1993) ===
Since 1993, under provisions of new local administration law, the Mayor of Trieste is chosen by direct election, originally every four, and since 2001 every five years.

	Mayor of Trieste	Took office	Left office	Party	Coalition	Election
8	Riccardo Illy (b. 1955)	6 December 1993	12 May 1997	Ind	PDS • AD • DC	1993
8	Riccardo Illy (b. 1955)	12 May 1997	24 June 2001	Ind	PDS • PPI • RI	1997
9	Roberto Dipiazza (b. 1953)	24 June 2001	24 April 2006	FI	House of Freedoms (FI-AN-LN-UDC)	2001
9	Roberto Dipiazza (b. 1953)	24 April 2006	31 May 2011	FI	House of Freedoms (FI-AN-LN-UDC)	2006
10	Roberto Cosolini (b. 1956)	31 May 2011	20 June 2016	PD	PD • SEL • FdS • IdV	2011
(9)	Roberto Dipiazza (b. 1953)	20 June 2016	18 October 2021	FI	FI • LN • FdI	2016
(9)	Roberto Dipiazza (b. 1953)	18 October 2021 (Note: Election originally scheduled for June 2021 and then postponed due to the coronavirus pandemic.)	In office	FI	FI • LN • FdI	2021
