= Roberto Dipiazza =

Italian politician (born 1953)

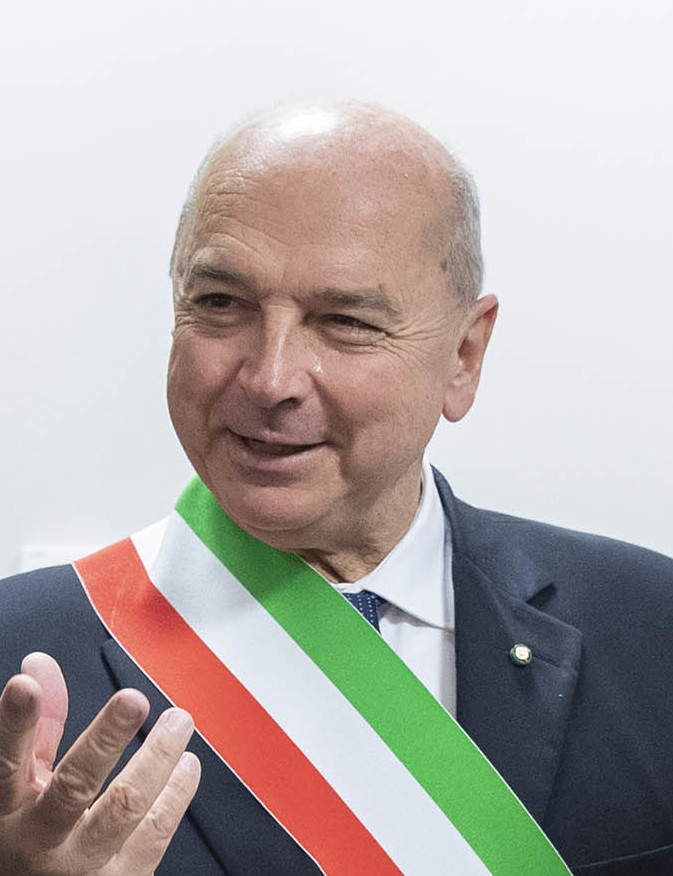
- DiPiazza in 2019

Mayor of Trieste
- Incumbent
- Assumed office 20 June 2016
- Preceded by: Roberto Cosolini
- In office 24 June 2001 – 31 May 2011
- Preceded by: Riccardo Illy
- Succeeded by: Roberto Cosolini

Member of the Regional Council of Friuli-Venezia Giulia
- In office 25 April 2013 – 21 June 2016

Personal details
- Born: 1 February 1953 (age 73) Aiello del Friuli, Italy
- Party: FI (till 2009); PdL (2009-2013); NCD (2013-2016); FI (since 2016)
- Profession: Entrepreneur, politician

Roberto Dipiazza (born 1 February 1953) is an Italian entrepreneur and politician. A member of the centre-right party Forza Italia, he has been mayor of Muggia between 1996 and 2001 and mayor of Trieste between 2001 and 2011 and again since 2016.

== Career ==
His working career started as a large-scale retail manager before setting up his own business enterprise in Trieste's province. His political debut happened in December 1996 when he was elected Mayor of Muggia as the leader of a centre-right coalition. His administration claimed to have renovated the old town and to have revived tourism thanks mainly to the new Porto S. Rocco, considered one of the most highly rated yacht clubs in the northern Adriatic Sea, built with international entrepreneurs' support. He also claimed to have succeeded in improving cross-border relations between Italy and Slovenia thanks to the setting up of new business relations between Italian and Slovene multi-utility (gas, water, electricity) companies. In 2000, he was named commendatore (an official title awarded for services given to the Republic of Italy) by President Carlo Azeglio Ciampi.

In May 2001, he was elected Mayor of Trieste with the support of a centre right coalition for a first term. His political program focused on a new role for the city of Trieste linked to the eastern expansion of the European Union, the trade development of the port, the reorganization of the so-called porto vecchio, and the strengthening of the links between the city and its international institutes of advanced studies and applied research. During his first term (2001–2006) as Mayor of Trieste, the merger between Acegas (Trieste) and Aps (Padua) created the biggest multi-utility listed on the stock exchange in the north east of Italy. In 2004, the Italian financial newspaper Il Sole 24 Ore rated Trieste as the best city in Italy for urban quality of life and services. He also supported sports activities and became president of the second division basketball team Pallacanestro Trieste 2004. In the same year (2004), he was named "grande ufficiale" (another official title awarded for services given to the Republic of Italy) by Carlo Azeglio Ciampi (President in 1999–2006).

In May 2006, he was elected Mayor of Trieste for a second term with the support of a centre-right coalition. His program for the new term supported the vision of a city becoming the "capital" of the Adriatic region: a city able to offer qualified services and founding its economic revival on trading and on increased port activities, Trieste's age-old tradition.

His administration claimed to have started a "renaissance" of the city, fuelled by new initiatives in scientific research and by the policy of making Trieste an exclusive centre for tourists, both from Italy and from central and eastern European countries. The increase of holiday cruisers calling in Trieste, a result actually achieved by the Autorità portuale (an apolitical port-related institution), and the newly reconversion of the old fish market building into a contemporary art gallery were seen by his supporters as important steps in this direction. The goal to reduce the ICI (a local tax on Real estate) was Dipiazza's priority, which implied a strict intervention on public expenses without touching the running of the municipality's administrative structure and services, and it was a matter of debate in the city whether the services were really not touched. Dipiazza leftthe office on 29 May 2011.

As mayor of Trieste, he was also in charge as President of the Teatro Lirico Giuseppe Verdi. In April 2013, he was a candidate for regional councilor in Friuli-Venezia Giulia regional election for the list of PDL, the party of Silvio Berlusconi and Angelino Alfano: Dipiazza obtained a very high record of preferences in his constituency and he was elected as regional councilor. In May 2014, he was a candidate of NCD (Angelino Alfano's political party) for the European Parliament, but he was not elected. In June 2016, he was the candidate of FI (Silvio Berlusconi's political party) for the office of Mayor of Trieste with the support of NCD, Brothers of Italy, Northern League and other minor lists of the center right coalition: Dipiazza was elected against Roberto Cosolini (member of PD), the incumbent mayor of Trieste (2011–2016), for a new (the third) term.
