= Civic Network of South Tyrol =

The Civic Network of South Tyrol (German: Südtiroler Bürgernetz; Italian: Rete Civica dell'Alto Adige; Ladin: Rëi Zivica de Südtirol) is the official site of the Autonomous Province of Bolzano - South Tyrol, serving for e-Government and public administration and generally as South Tyrol's web portal. Administrative content is available in the official languages German, Italian and to a lesser extent in Ladin. Some of the more general content and the most important provincial laws can also be accessed in English.

The portal provides access to all levels of the provincial administration, that is the municipalities, districts and the provincial government, as well as to educational institutions and the public health service. Its archive contains statistical material and summaries of the legislative and administrative powers of the autonomous province. Additionally, the portal offers information services such as traffic and pollen reports, weather and avalanche forecasts, timetables and price comparisons, a data base for job seekers, and many more services.

Being in public ownership, it is run by the Südtiroler Informatik AG (South Tyrolean Informatics JSC) and is considered an integral part of the E-South Tyrol project.

== See also ==
- Das Land Südtirol
