= Der Schlern =

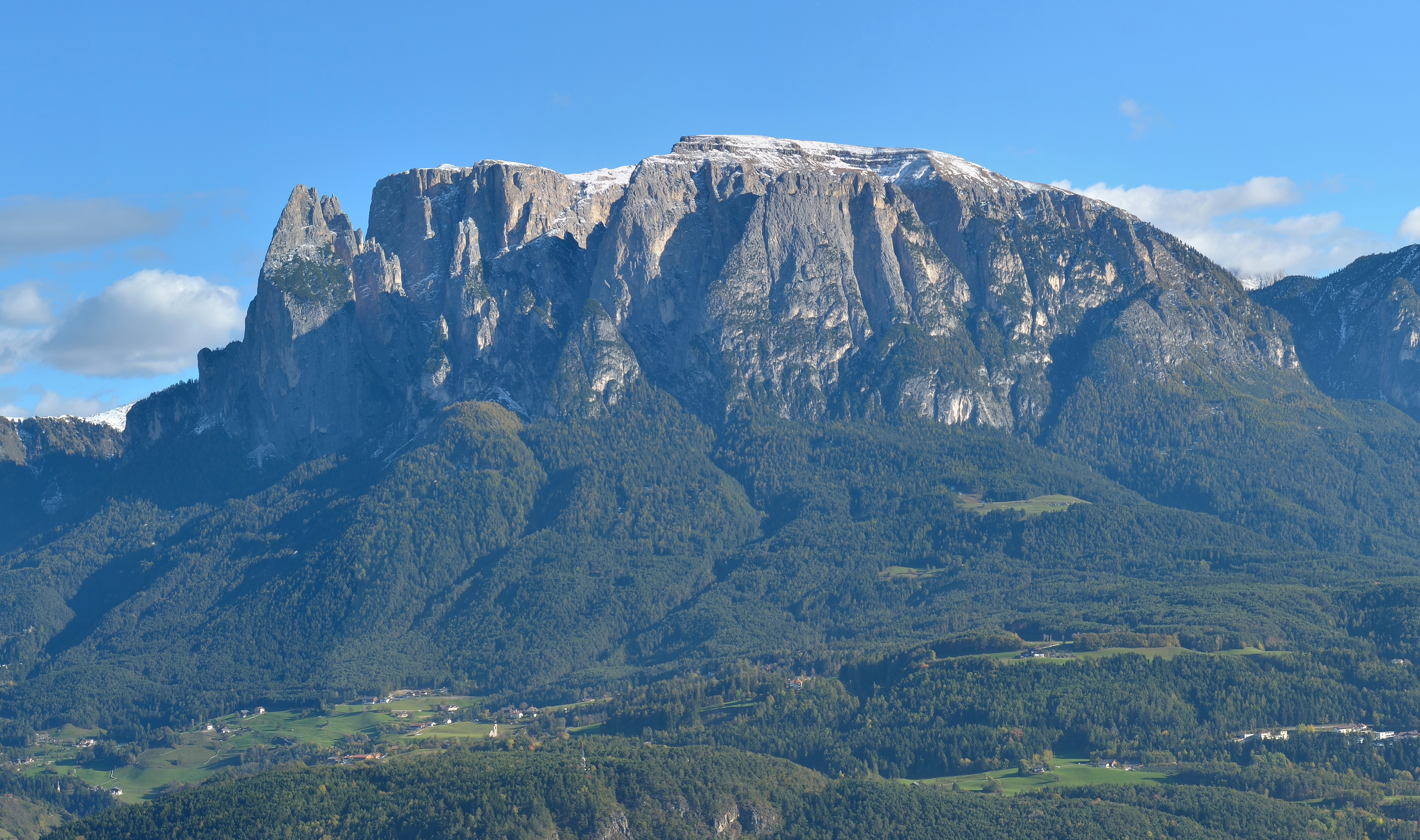
The journal Der Schlern was named after the mountain Schlern.

Der Schlern (full German title: Der Schlern – Zeitschrift für Südtiroler Landeskunde; English: The Schlern – Magazine for South Tyrolean Regional Studies) is a German-language monthly for the study of science, research, art and culture related to South Tyrol.

First published on 1 January 1920, it is named after the Schlern, a characteristic mountain in the Dolomites. In 1938, it was forbidden by the Italian fascist regime as part of their Italianization of South Tyrol programme, but permitted again by the allied administration in 1946.

The magazine is currently published in Bolzano by Athesia (formerly Tyrolia).
