= Radio Tandem (Italy) =

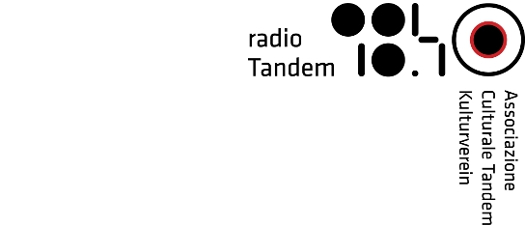
Radio Tandem logo

Radio Tandem is a local broadcaster in South Tyrol, Italy. Located in the city of Bolzano, it has been on the air since May 1977 and is one of the oldest Italian independent radio stations.

The station was founded in 1977 as Radio Popolare and was renamed Radio Tandem in 1982.
