= Austria–Italy relations =

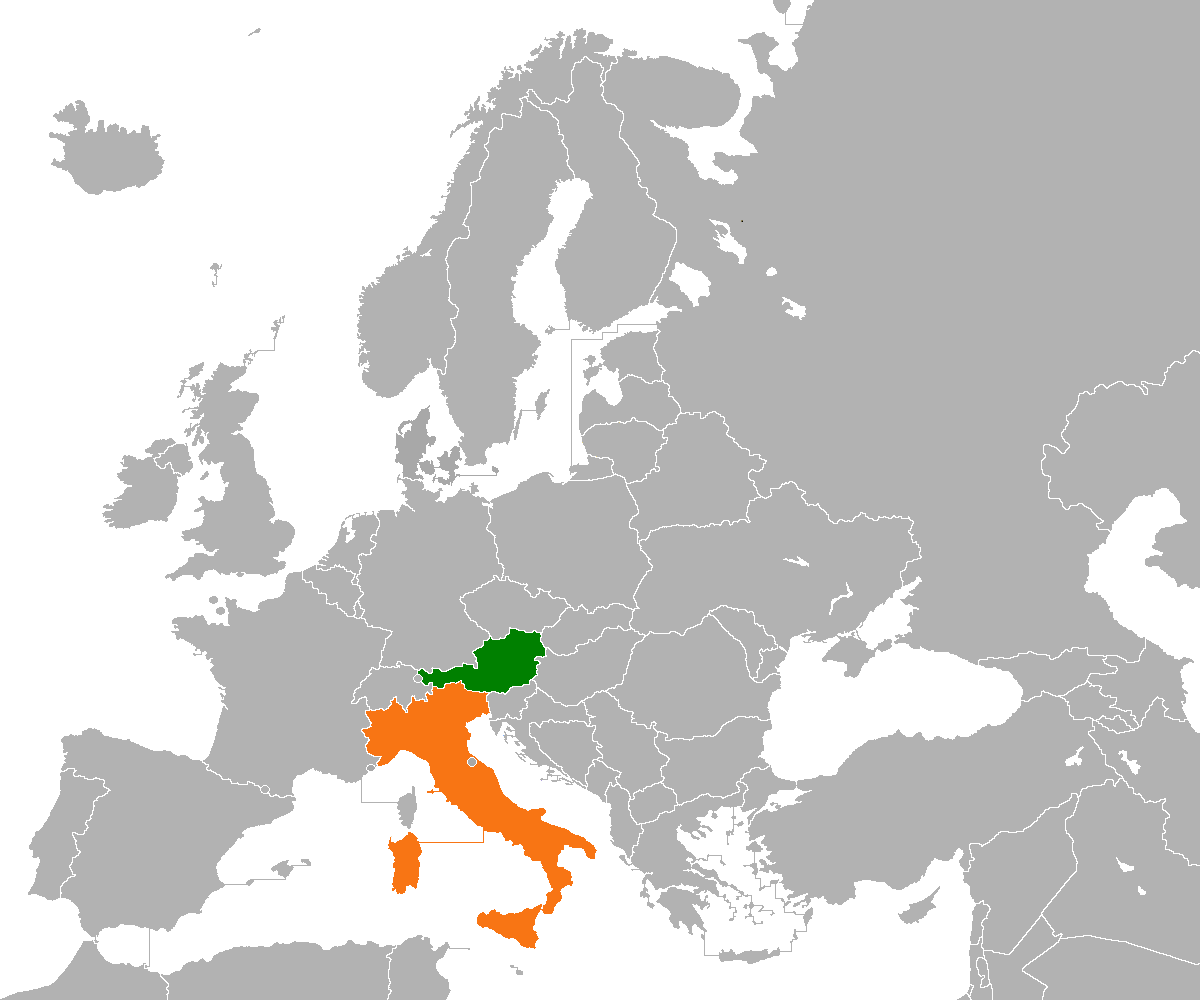
- Austria: Italy

Foreign relations exist between Austria and Italy. Austria has an embassy in Rome and a consulate-general in Milan. Italy has an embassy in Vienna and a consulate in Innsbruck. Both countries are full members of the Council of Europe, European Union, Organisation for Economic Co-operation and Development, and Organization for Security and Co-operation in Europe. The countries share 420 km of common borders.

== History ==
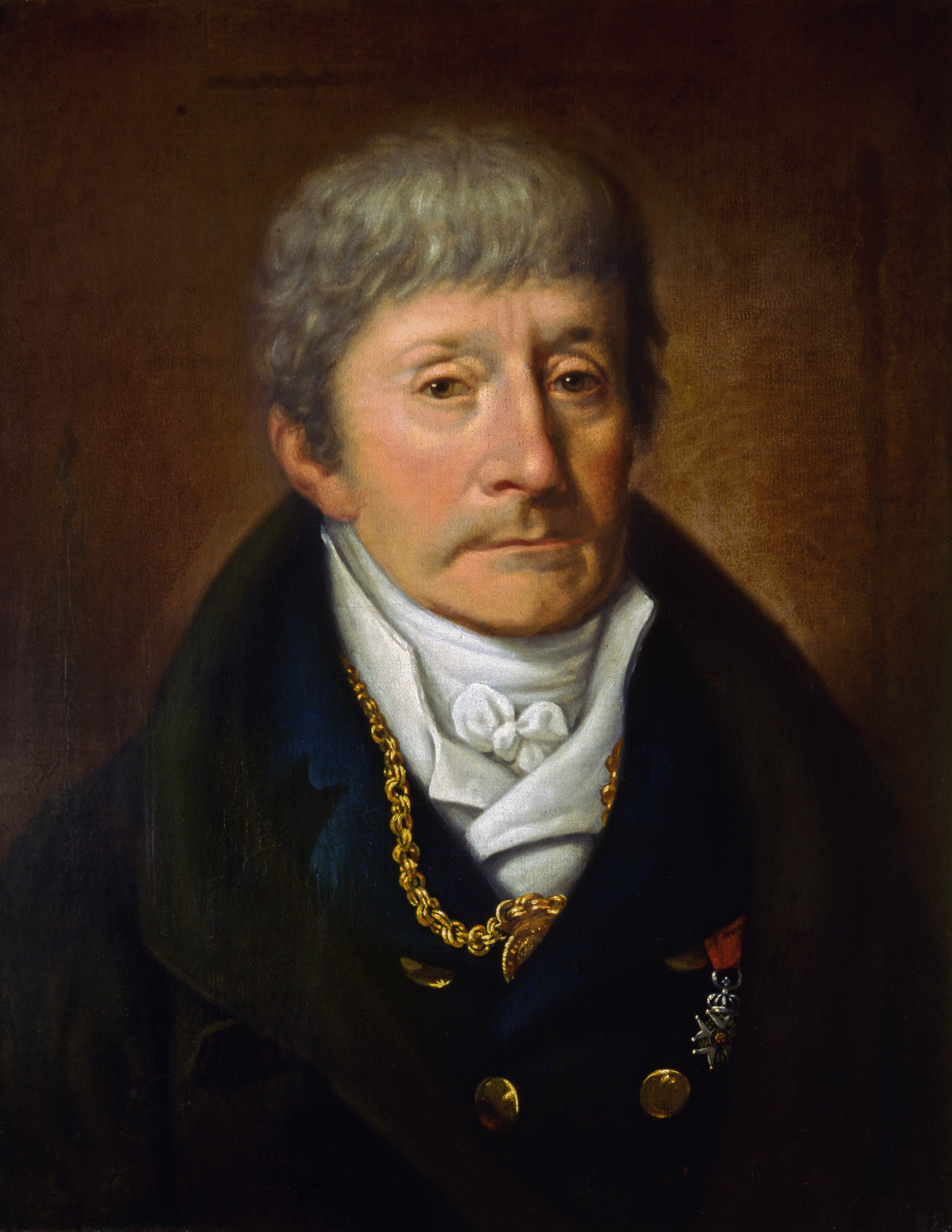
Antonio Salieri, Italian composer who worked mainly in Austria. Kapellmeister from 1788 to 1824.

Since the Middle Ages, Austria had a great influence over the Italian states, especially in the north of the country. On the other side Italy influenced Austrian culture, architecture and cuisine, many artists and architects such as Santino Solari, Martino Altomonte, Giovanni Zucalli, Vincenzo Scamozzi worked and contributed to the Baroque in Austria and most notable in Salzburg.

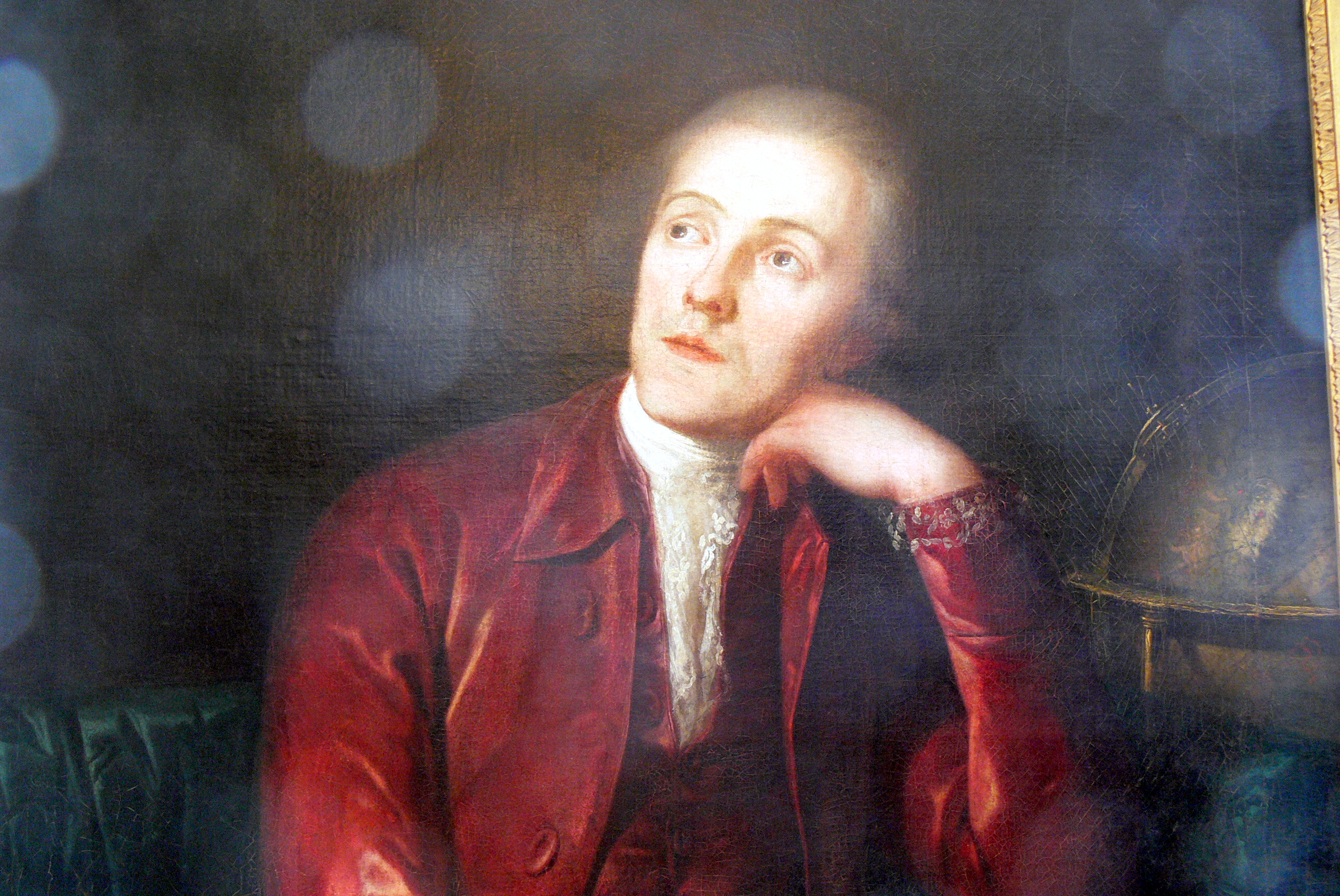
Nicolò Pacassi, an Austrian architect of Italian descent.

Since the late Middle Ages, the Italians and Austrians have fought a number of wars, either as enemies or allies. Austria was allied with several Italian states during wars against the Ottoman Empire, e.g. with Tuscany, Mantua, Ferrara, Savoy and the Papal States in the war of 1593–1606, and with Venice in the wars of 1684–1699 and 1716–1718. Austria and the Republic of Venice warred against each other in the Uskok War of 1615–1618.

Since the 18th century, Austria expanded into Italy and ruled various parts of Italy at various times. As a result of the War of the Spanish Succession, the Duchy of Milan and Mantua in northern Italy, and the kingdoms of Naples and Sardinia in southern Italy fell to Austria in 1714. By the Treaty of The Hague of 1720, Austria acquired the Kingdom of Sicily in exchange for Sardinia, which passed to the Duchy of Savoy. During the War of the Polish Succession, Austria lost both Naples and Sicily in 1734, but acquired the Duchy of Parma. During the War of the Austrian Succession, Austria fought against the Republic of Genoa and Duchy of Modena and Reggio, and even briefly occupied Genoa and Modena, however per the Treaty of Aix-la-Chapelle from 1748, the Austrians withdrew from both countries, and also lost Parma. In 1797, in accordance to the Treaty of Campo Formio, Austria lost Milan and Mantua to the newly formed Cisalpine Republic, but gained a portion of the Republic of Venice, which was partitioned between Austria and France, with the Austrian-annexed part forming the new Venetian Province. In 1803, the prince-bishopric of Trent was annexed into Austrian-ruled Tyrol. In 1805, Austria lost the Venetian Province to the Napoleonic Kingdom of Italy, and Trento to the Napoleonic Kingdom of Italy in 1810. After the Congress of Vienna, in 1815, Venice, Milan, Mantua and Trento fell again to Austria, with the former three included in the newly formed Kingdom of Lombardy–Venetia, and the latter reannexed into Tyrol.

The Congress of Laibach in 1821 was a pivotal moment in the Austrian Empire's diplomatic relations with Sardinia. The congress, attended by the great powers, set the conditions for Austrian intervention in the Two Sicilies against the Neapolitan revolutionary. This congress, which included the monarchs of Russia, Austria, Prussia, and other minor European states proclaimed hostility to revolutionary regimes and authorized the Austrian army to restore the absolutist monarchy, which encouraged against resistance among the Neapolitans rebels. A similar revolt in Piedmont was put down by the joint Austrians-Sardinian at Novara on 8 April 1821.

Revolts broke out on 10 February 1831, initially in the northern duchies of Modena and Parma, and soon spread to the Legations, the northern provinces of the Papal States. Within two days of Gregory XVI’s election, three major cities in the Papal States rose in rebellion, and unrest rapidly extended throughout nearly all papal territories, except Lazio. The insurgents were able, at least initially, to gain control of northern provinces without bloodshed. The revolts prompted appeals from Italian (Modenese and Parman) princes for Austrian assistance, and the Austrian military, under the auspices of Klemens von Metternich’s guidance, intervened to restore papal authority. Although Austrian generals initially delayed action due to concerns over a potential issue, the reinforcements eventually overwhelmed the insurgents. The revolt was crushed in a relatively short period, with Austrian forces reestablishing the status quo, which restoring order. Leopold II’s early years coincided with rising Italian nationalism and the formation of secret societies pushing for Italian unification. Tuscany’s geographical position in Central Italy and its historical prosperity made it a focal point for Austrian diplomatic and military interests. The tension between Leopold II’s liberal reforms and entrenched conservative Florentine-Tuscans elites. He faced a significant mistake against Sardinian forces during the Italian unification process as Leopold II, a liberal monarch, attempted to maintain a policy of neutrality policies and actions alienated some of his Austrian allies during the Second Italian War of Independence but was expelled by a bloodless coup on 27 April 1859.

Rhine Crisis of 1840 was a diplomatic and nationalist upheaval in Europe, largely involving Kingdom of France and the German Confederation. While direct military conflict did not occur, the crisis had broader repercussions, including Italian principalities states generally followed Austrian hegemony such as the Kingdom of Lombardy–Venetia lead, aligning with maintaining balance-of-power policies espoused by the Habsburg monarchy. They were cautious, avoiding the provocation of France, and primarily engaged in monitoring and reporting, rather than active preparation for military engagement.

Austrian rule in northern Italy created the conditions in which Italian nationalism and Austrian interests clashed in the three Wars of Italian Independence between 1848 and 1866 ultimately leading to Italian victory. The Italian struggle against Austria is mentioned in the national anthem of Italy, written in 1847. Tensions remained throughout the 1870s as continued Austrian rule over Italian inhabited lands such as in Trentino and Istria, inflamed Italian nationalism which in turn threatened Austrian integrity; as a result the Austrians built further fortifications along the Italian border. In 1876, the Austrian Archduke Albrecht advocated a preventive war against Italy.

Despite entering into the Triple Alliance of 1882 (along with Germany), areas of clashing interest remained. Italy's improving relations with France, Italian interests in the Balkans, and continuing nationalism among Italians within Austria-Hungary concerned leaders in Vienna. Italy's adherence to the Triple Alliance in the event of war was doubted and from 1903 plans for a possible war against Rome were again maintained by the Austrian general staff. Mutual suspicions led to reinforcement of the frontier and speculation in the press about a war between the two countries into the first decade of the twentieth century. As late as 1911 Count Franz Conrad von Hötzendorf, chief of the Austrian general staff, was advocating a military strike against Austria's supposed Italian allies.

During World War I, Italy fought on the side of the Triple Entente against Austria-Hungary despite their defensive alliance signed some decades earlier, after securing support for territorial expansion in the Treaty of London in 1915. By World War I's end, Italy emerged victorious and gained territories from Austria, incl. Trento and Trieste. Additionally, the predominantly German-speaking region of South Tyrol was annexed to Italy. During fascist rule, the German-speaking population became subject of forced Italianization attempts, which had a negative impact on the relations between the Kingdom of Italy and the newly founded Austrian Republic.

During World War II, since 1943, Italian prisoners of war were among Allied POWs held in German POW camps operated in German-annexed Austria, such as Stalag XVII-A, Stalag XVII-B, Stalag XVIII-A, Stalag 317/XVIII-C, Stalag 398 and Oflag XVIII-A. Italians were also imprisoned in the Mauthausen concentration camp and its subcamps in Austria.

After World War II, disputes about autonomous rights for the German-speaking South Tyroleans led to continued tensions between Austria and Italy. The South Tyrol Question (Südtirolfrage) became an international issue, after the Austrian government deemed that the provisions of the Gruber–De Gasperi Agreement hadn't been implemented correctly. Austria took the issue to the United Nations in 1960. A fresh round of negotiations took place, which lead to a more extensive statute of autonomy for South Tyrol in 1972. In 1992, Austria declared the disagreement to be fully resolved.

Austrian Interior Minister Herbert Kickl said on 5 June 2018 that Italy is a strong ally of Austria.

== Resident diplomatic missions ==
- Austria has an embassy in Rome and a consulate-general in Milan.
- Italy has an embassy in Vienna.

== Gallery ==
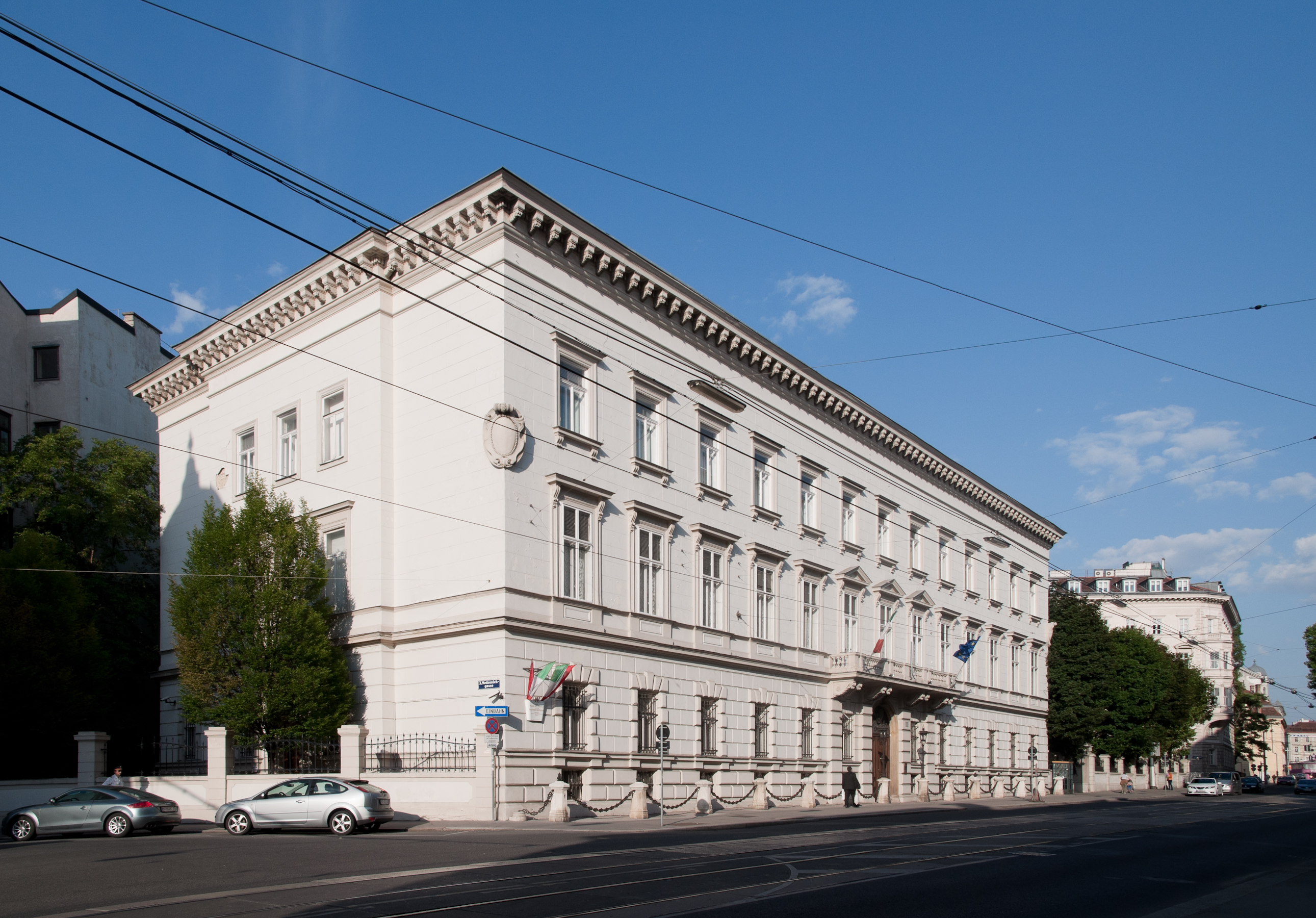
Palais Matternich in Vienna, seat of the Italian Embassy

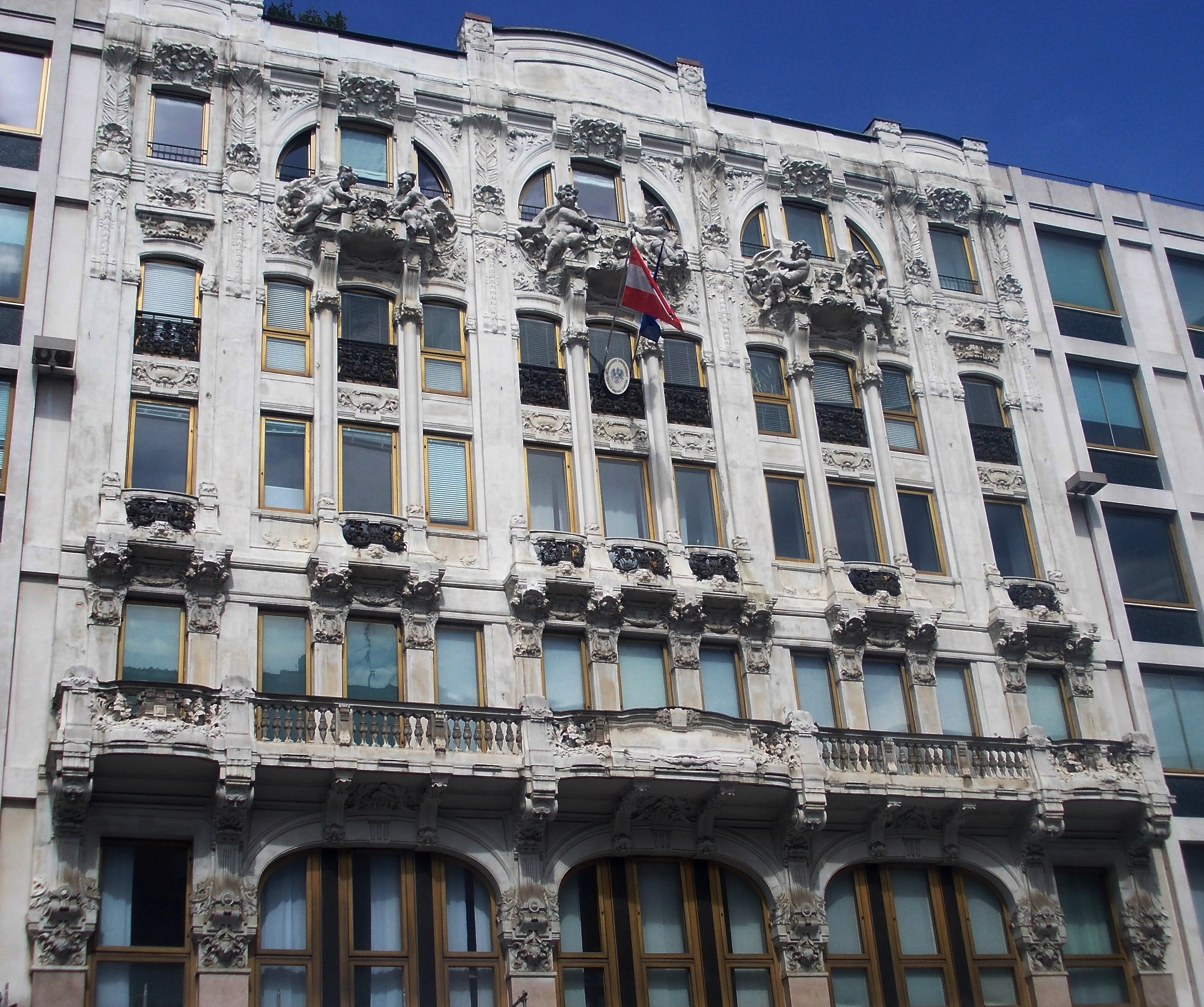
Consulate General of Austria in Milan, Italy

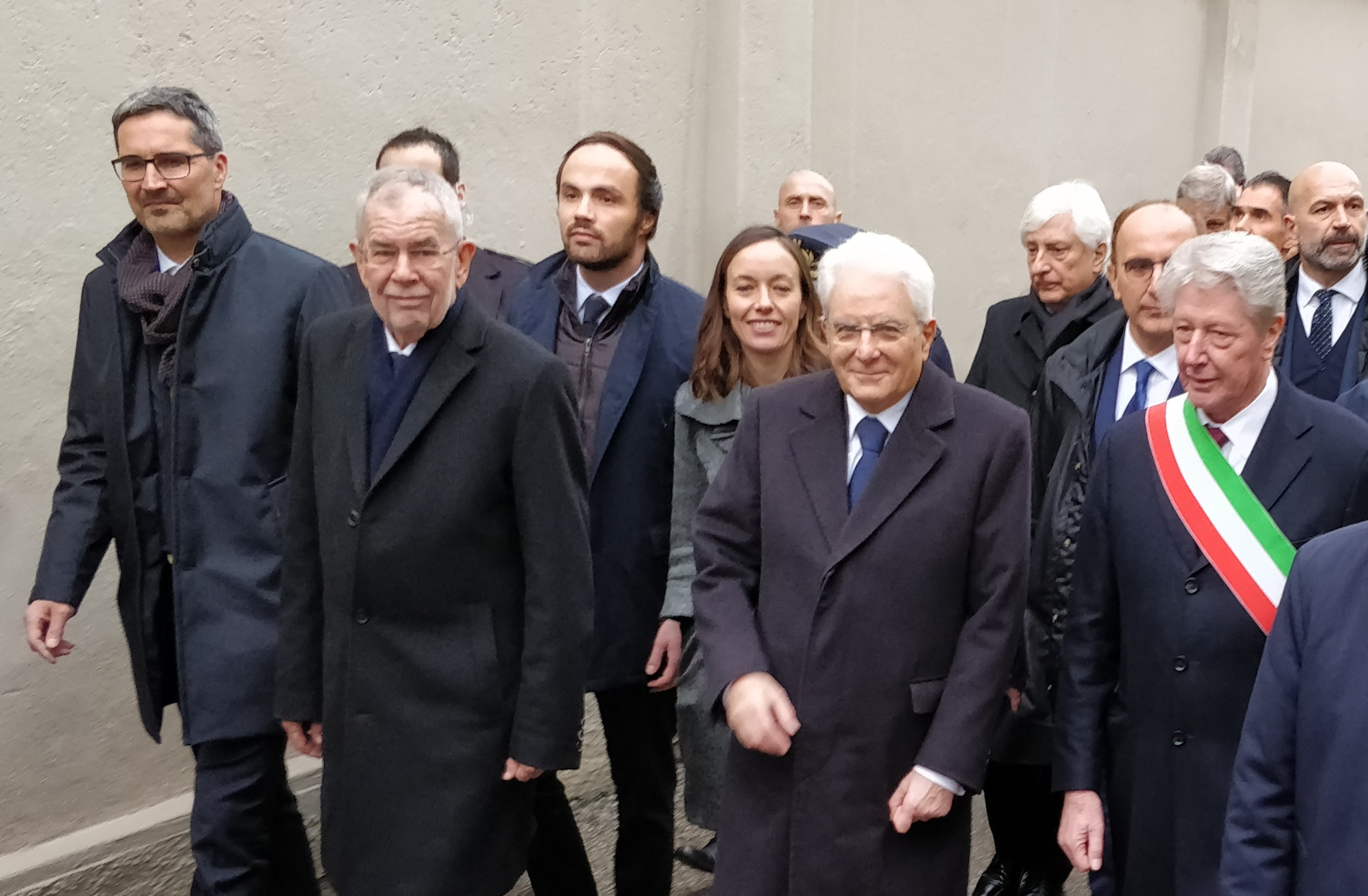
The President of Austria Alexander Van der Bellen and the President of Italy Sergio Mattarella together with the Governor of South Tyrol Arno Kompatscher and the Mayor of Bolzano Renzo Caramaschi by the Bolzano Transit Camp in 2019

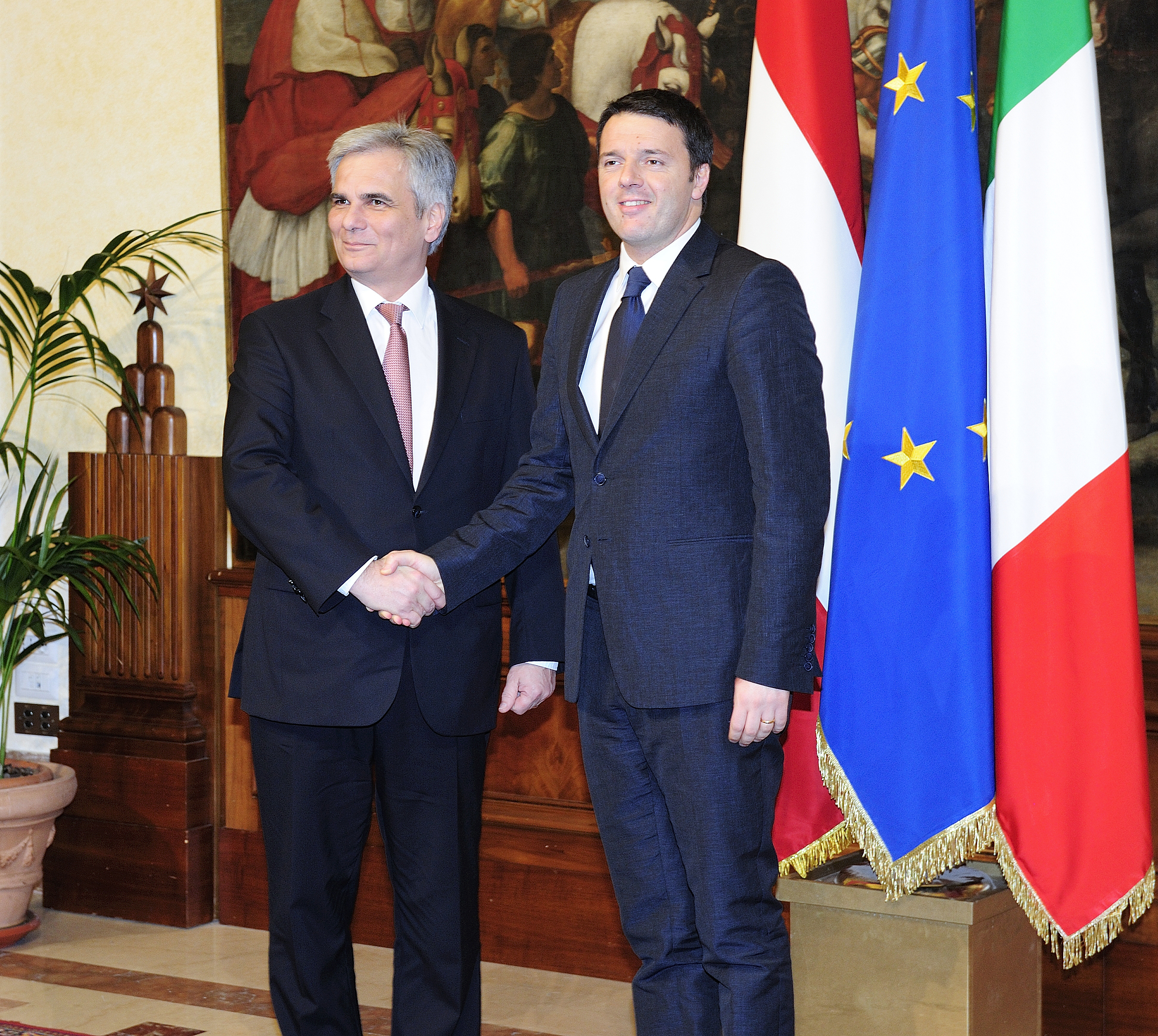
Matteo Renzi with Werner Faymann

== See also ==
- Foreign relations of Austria
- Foreign relations of Italy
- Austria–Germany relations
- Germany–Italy relations
