= Genova Giovanni Thaon di Revel =

Italian politician (1817–1910)

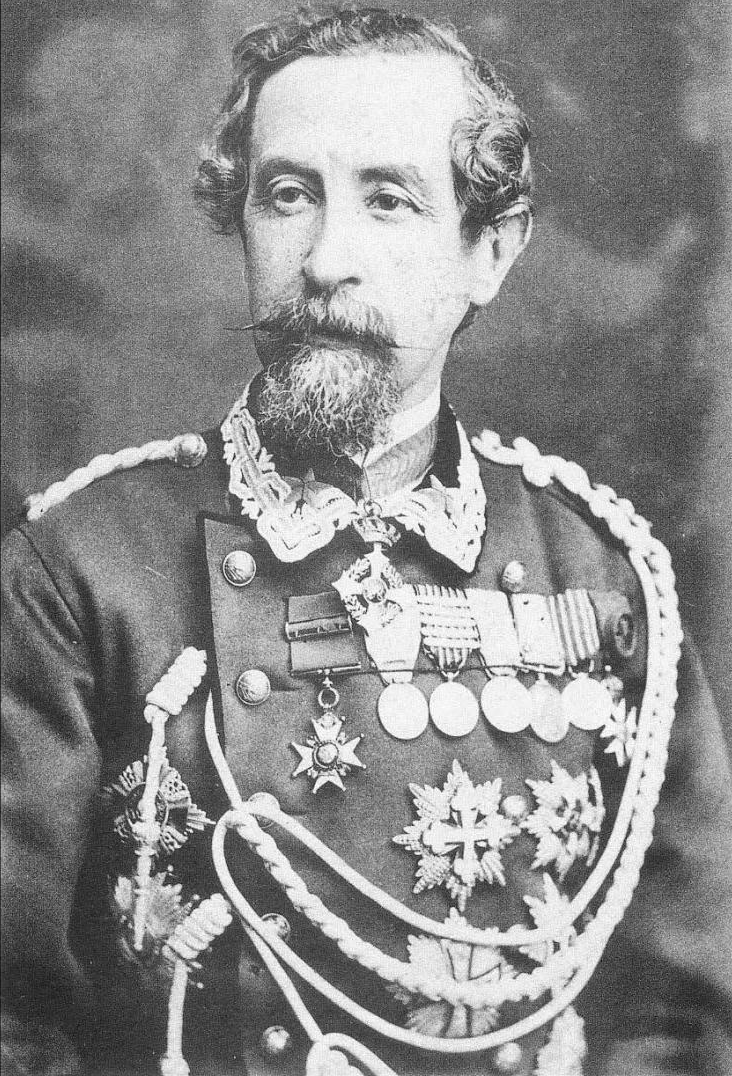

Minister of War
- In office 10 April 1867 – 27 October 1867
- Preceded by: Efisio Cugia
- Succeeded by: Ettore Bertolè-Viale

Senator
- In office 14 January 1880 – 3 September 1910

Member of the Chamber of Deputies of the Kingdom of Italy
- In office 4 March 1866 – 20 September 1874

Member of the Chamber of Deputies of the Kingdom of Sardinia
- In office 15 November 1857 – 10 May 1860

Count Genova Giovanni Battista Thaon di Revel (Genoa, 21 November 1817 – Como, 3 September 1910) was an Italian nobleman, soldier, politician, diplomat and historian. He took part in the Risorgimento campaigns and the Crimean War. He carried out several diplomatic missions for the Sardinian government. He was also minister of war and a senator of the Kingdom of Italy.

== Biography ==
Genova Thaon di Revel was the twelfth son of the Piedmontese noble it: Ignazio Thaon di Revel and Sabina Spitalieri of Cessole. Coming from a solidly wealthy family with a large and important network of relationships, he was well integrated into Turin's high society. One of his brothers, Adriano, was minister plenipotentiary in London and Vienna, while another, Ottavio, was minister of finance of the Kingdom of Sardinia.

== Training ==
Thaon attended the it: Accademia Reale di Torino. At the age of seventeen he was made second lieutenant in the Royal Sardinian Army and was promoted to lieutenant in 1837.

He was among the founding members of the Società del Whist of Turin (founded in 1841 by Count Camillo Benso di Cavour), which became an important meeting place for Piedmontese high society. He undertook numerous trips to Europe (in 1842, he visited Scotland and Ireland) and in 1844 he was in London, guest of his second cousin Emanuele d'Azeglio. In the same year, due to military commitments, he was sent to Chambéry, where he was in command of an artillery battery for several months, and, during his stay, he accompanied Prince Ferdinand, Duke of Genoa visiting the region of his ancestors.

== First War of Independence ==
In July 1847 Thaon made his debut in the diplomatic field: he had the task of learning the intentions of the Papal States after the occupation of Ferrara by Austrian troops. He himself defined it as "a curious mission", which allowed him to come into contact with moderate circles in Rome, committed to creating a new national political structure and aiming to remove Austria from Italy.

Once the First Italian War of Independence broke out, on 31 March 1848 he was appointed captain of artillery in the 4th division. On the night between 12 and 13 April he received the order from Major Alfonso Ferrero La Marmora to deploy the artillery to bombard the fortress of Peschiera del Garda. The operation placed him alongside La Marmora, with whom he remained linked by sincere friendship throughout his life. He later took part (6 May 1848) in the battle of Santa Lucia, just outside Verona, with the division of the Duke of Savoy, after which he was assigned to command the 9th battery (1 June 1848) at Venaria Reale. He took part in the battle of Custoza, where he received his first recognition for valor. After these episodes, Thaon followed the retreat of the reserve division to Codogno. When (4 August) Carlo Alberto decided to bring the army to Milan and place it outside the walls, Thaon was stationed at Porta Vigentina, where he countered the assaults of the Austrian forces with his own battery. He later participated in the Battle of Novara, in which he distinguished himself and was decorated with the silver medal for military valour.

== Military attaché in Vienna ==
After peace was agreed with Austria, Alfonso La Marmora, appointed Minister of War, sent four of the best officers from the Artillery Corps as military attachés to Berlin and Vienna – Giuseppe Govone, Agostino Petitti Bagliani di Roreto, Paolo di Sanrobert and Thaon di Revel. Genova moved to Vienna, where he joined his brother Adriano, serving as plenipotentiary minister of the Kingdom of Sardinia.

His secret task was to study the organization of the Austrian army and carefully examine the political and military situation. This three-year mission took him to Hungary and Berlin as well as Vienna. His mission ended in April 1853, due to the crisis between the Sardinia and Austria following the failed Mazzinian uprising in Milan.

== The Crimean War and Sardinian parliament ==
On 11 April 1855, Thaon was sent, with the artillery officer Vittorio Asinari di San Marzano, to Crimea as military commissioners in the headquarters of Sardinia’s English and French allies. Thaon went to the English headquarters under the command of General Lord Raglan. When the war council of the allies decided on an attack (18 June 1855) against the fortifications of Sevastopol, Thaon took part and later received the appointment as major on 27 June 1856.

Following the death of San Marzano from cholera, Thaon was also responsible for liaising with the French command, but in mid-July he too fell seriously ill and was sent to Constantinople for initial treatment, before returning to Piedmont. During the voyage he became ill again, perhaps from typhus. Upon his return he was assigned to command the 9th battery in Venaria Reale.

He stood for election to the Subalpine Parliament for the first time in November 1857 in the Gassino constituency. He was elected deputy in the VI legislature and joined the benches on the constitutional right led by his brother Ottavio. He was re-elected to the VII legislature, serving until 1860 when he resigned following his promotion to colonel.

== Second War of Independence ==
When the Second Italian War of Independence broke out, at the beginning of May 1858 Thaon di Revel was assigned to the 5th division in Valenza, under the command of Domenico Cucchiari, and then moved to the 3rd division, commanded by General Giovanni Durando.

Revel assumed command of the artillery brigade consisting of the 4th, 5th and 6th batteries. On May 22 he received orders to execute a diversionary maneuver in conjunction with the 2nd and 5th divisions; feigning an attempt to cross the Sesia river near Palestro. The objective was to keep the Austrian forces located on the left bank of the river engaged and support the advance of the 4th division. Lacking the equipment to build bridges, Thaon had the battery's carriages run along the riverbank to distract the Austrians. This action caused serious losses for his division but earned him "honorable mention for having distinguished himself in the action at the port of Palestro and on the Sesia and for the skill and coolness with which he directed the artillery under his orders". Shortly afterwards he took part in the decisive battle of Solferino, during which he suffered a bruised leg and received the Officer's Cross of the Military Order of Savoy for his ability to direct the artillery action during combat.

Soon afterwards, in Milan, Thaon met his future wife, Camilla Albani, Countess of Castelbarco. He obtained promotion to lieutenant colonel and in October 1859 he was appointed commander of the artillery brigade in Milan.

Having left the Sardinian parliament in May 1860 following his promotion to colonel, he took part in the expedition to the Marche and directed the artillery operations in the siege of Ancona. On 12 December of that year he was appointed Director General for war affairs in the Neapolitan Provinces and, in 1861, he was promoted to major general of the newly established Royal Italian Army. Until 1862 he commanded a grenadier brigade in Terni.

== In the Italian parliament ==
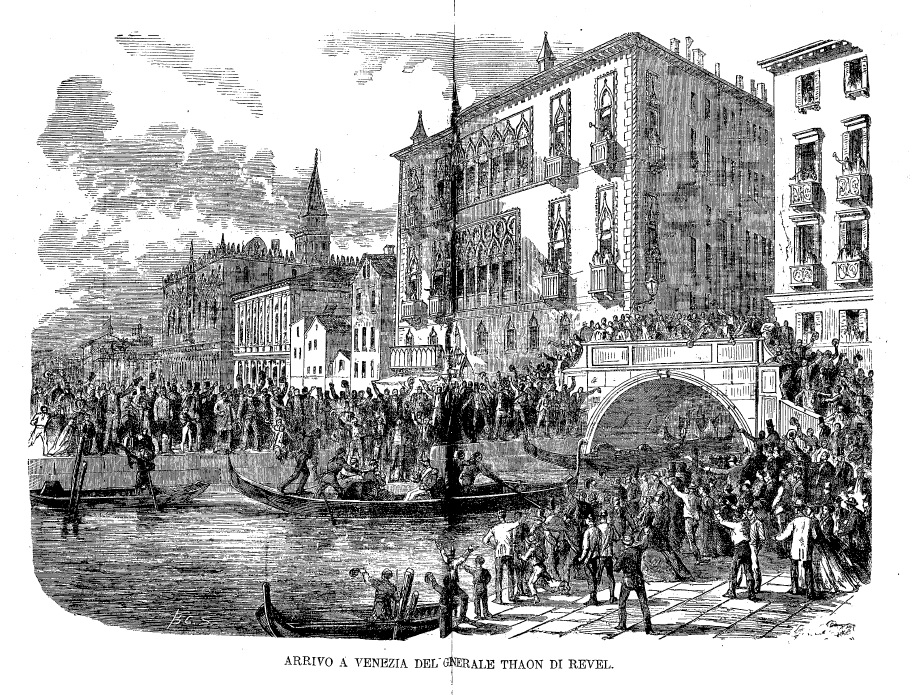
Thaon di Revel arrives in Venice, 1866

In 1865 he was elected deputy to the parliament of the Kingdom of Italy for the constituency of Chivasso and remained there for three legislatures, until 1874.

He took part in the Third Italian War of Independence in June 1866 and, as the king's commissioner, was an important organizer and mediator during the Veneto plebiscite which sanctioned the passage of that region to the Kingdom of Italy. In recognition, he was promoted to lieutenant general on 19 October 1866.

== Minister of War and Senator ==
Thaon di Revel was briefly war minister of in the second Rattazzi government in 1867. As minister Thaon sought to introduce army reforms that would both see military spending reduced and allow Italy to learn from its own recent military experience as well as that of other countries.

During his period in office Garibaldi had gathered a corps of volunteers on the border with the Papal States and was preparing to invade it. Rattazzi and Thaon di Revel had Garibaldi arrested, but the situation got out of control when on 19 October he escaped from Caprera and landed in Tuscany to launch a new invasion of the Papal States. He resigned because the cabinet would not agree to his plan to mass fifty battalions of troops along the border with the Papal States to prevent Garibaldi’s partisans from invading as well as controlling brigandage in the border region.

In 1879 he was appointed senator of the Kingdom. In 1887 he was placed on reserve duty. In 1905 he was awarded the collar of the Supreme Order of the Most Holy Annunciation, the highest honor of the House of Savoy and the Kingdom.

He lived until the age of 93 and served his country under four rulers. His remains rest in a columbarium in the lower western DE gallery of the monumental cemetery of Milan.

== Family ==
In Milan on 26 December 1862, he married Camilla Castelbarco Visconti Simonetta with whom he had 5 children, two of whom (Umberto and Ottavia Maria) did not reach the age of majority. Sabina (17 April 1865-Como 1950) married Count Emiliano Parravicini of Parravicino on 10 July 1893. The same year the last son Antonio, a cavalry officer, died at the age of 24 due to a heart malformation. Carla (born 2 February 1875) married Count Guido Barbiano of Belgioioso in Milan on 20 April 1898.

== Works ==
- La cessione del Veneto: Ricordi di un Commissario Regio Militare, 1890
- Dal 1847 al 1855: La Spedizione di Crimea; Ricordi di un Commissario Militare del Re, 1891
- Il 1859 e l'Italia Centrale: Miei Ricordi, 1891
- Da Ancona a Napoli: Miei Ricordi, 1892
- Umbria ed Aspromonte: Ricordi Diplomatici, 1894
- Sette Mesi al Ministero, 1895

== Honours ==
=== Italian honours ===
Cavaliere dell'Ordine Supremo della Santissima Annunziata – ribbon for ordinary uniform

Knight of the Supreme Order of the Most Holy Annunciation
— 1905

Cavaliere di Gran Croce dell'Ordine dei Santi Maurizio e Lazzaro – ribbon for ordinary uniform

Grand Cordon of the Order of Saints Maurice and Lazarus
— 1967

Cavaliere di Gran Croce dell'Ordine della Corona d'Italia – ribbon for ordinary uniform

Grand Cordon of the Order of the Crown of Italy
— 1878

Grande ufficiale dell'Ordine militare di Savoia – ribbon for ordinary uniform

Grand Officer of the Military Order of Savoy
— 6 December 1866

Medaglia di bronzo al Valor Militare – ribbon for ordinary uniform

Bronze Medal of Military Valor
"For distinguishing himself at the battle of Palestro."
— 1859

Medaglia d'Argento al Valor Militare – ribbon for ordinary uniform

Silver Medal of Military Valor
"For distinguishing himself at the battle of Goito"
— 30 May 1848

Medaglia d'Argento al Valor Militare – ribbon for ordinary uniform

Silver Medal of Military Valor
"For distinguishing himself at the battle of Novara."
— 23 March 1849

=== Foreign honours ===
Commendatore di I classe dell'Ordine del Leone di Zähringen (Granducato di Baden) – ribbon for ordinary uniform

Commander First Class of the Order of the Zähringer Lion (Grand Duchy of Baden)
— 26 November 1864

Cavaliere di Gran Croce dell'Ordine imperiale di Leopoldo (Impero austro-ungarico) – ribbon for ordinary uniform

Knight Grand Cross of the Order of Leopold (Austria)
— 21 March 1867

Cavaliere di Gran Croce dell'Ordine dell'Aquila rossa (Impero Tedesco) – ribbon for ordinary uniform

Knight Grand Cross of the Order of the Red Eagle (German Empire)
— 22 October 1875

Cavaliere di V classe dell'Ordine di Mejīdiyye (Impero Ottomano) – ribbon for ordinary uniform

Knight Fifth Class of the Order of the Medjidie (Ottoman Empire)
— 1859

Cavaliere di Gran Croce dell'Ordine del Cristo (Portogallo) – ribbon for ordinary uniform

Knight Grand Cross of the Military Order of Christ (Portugal)
— 9 January 1866

Grand'Ufficiale dell'Ordine della Legion d'onore (Francia) – ribbon for ordinary uniform

Grand Officer of the Legion of Honour (France)
— 2 September 1864

Gran Cordone dell'Ordine del Dannebrog (Danimarca) – ribbon for ordinary uniform

Grand Cordon of the Order of the Dannebrog (Denmark)
— 29 August 1864

Gran Cordone dell'Ordine di Nichan Iftikar (Tunisia) – ribbon for ordinary uniform

Grand Cordon of the Nishan Al-Iftikhar (Tunisia)
— 30 May 1867

Compagno dell'Ordine del Bagno (Regno Unito) – ribbon for ordinary uniform

Companion of the Order of the Bath (United Kingdom)
— 29 August 1859

Medaglia di Crimea (Regno Unito) – ribbon for ordinary uniform

Crimea Medal (United Kingdom)
