= First Minghetti government =

5th Government of Kingdom of Italy

Minghetti I government
- 5th Cabinet of Italy

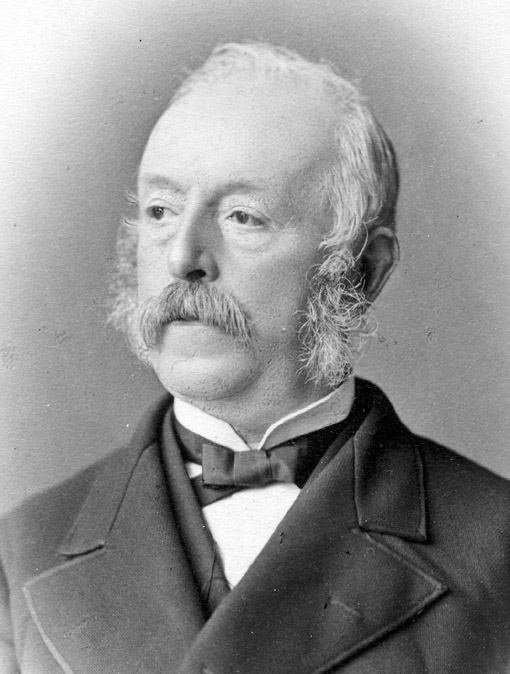
- Date formed: 24 March 1863
- Date dissolved: 28 September 1864

People and organisations
- Head of state: Victor Emmanuel II
- Head of government: Marco Minghetti
- Total no. of members: 9
- Member party: Historical Right

History
- Predecessor: Farini Cabinet
- Successor: La Marmora II Cabinet

The Minghetti I government of Italy held office from 24 March 1863 until 28 September 1864, a total of 554 days, or 1 year, 6 months and 4 days.

== Government parties ==
The government was composed by the following parties:

Party	Ideology	Leader
Historical Right	Conservatism	Marco Minghetti

== Composition ==
Office	Name	Party	Term
Prime Minister	Marco Minghetti	Historical Right	(1863–1864)
Minister of the Interior	Ubaldino Peruzzi	Historical Right	(1863–1864)
Minister of Foreign Affairs	Emilio Visconti Venosta	Historical Right	(1863–1864)
Minister of Grace and Justice	Giuseppe Pisanelli	Historical Right	(1863–1864)
Minister of Finance	Marco Minghetti	Historical Right	(1863–1864)
Minister of War	Alessandro Della Rovere	Military	(1863–1864)
Minister of the Navy	Orazio Di Negro	Military	(1863–1863)
Minister of the Navy	Efisio Cugia	Military	(1863–1864)
Minister of Agriculture, Industry and Commerce	Giovanni Manna	Historical Right	(1863–1864)
Minister of Public Works	Luigi Federico Menabrea	Historical Right	(1863–1864)
Minister of Public Education	Michele Amari	Historical Right	(1863–1864)
