= Farini government =

4th Government of Kingdom of Italy

- 4th Cabinet of Italy

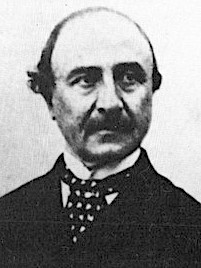
- Date formed: 8 December 1862
- Date dissolved: 24 March 1863

People and organisations
- Head of state: Victor Emmanuel II
- Head of government: Luigi Carlo Farini
- Total no. of members: 9
- Member party: Historical Right

History
- Predecessor: Rattazzi I Cabinet
- Successor: Minghetti I Cabinet

The Farini government of Italy held office from 8 December 1862 until 24 March 1863, a total of 106 days, or 3 months and 16 days.

== Government parties ==
The government was composed by the following parties:

| Party | Ideology | Leader |
|---|---|---|
| Historical Right | Conservatism | Bettino Ricasoli |

== Composition ==
| Office | Name | Party | Term |
|---|---|---|---|
| Prime Minister | Luigi Carlo Farini | Historical Right | (1862–1863) |
| Minister of the Interior | Ubaldino Peruzzi | Historical Right | (1862–1863) |
| Minister of Foreign Affairs | Giuseppe Pasolini | Historical Right | (1862–1863) |
| Minister of Grace and Justice | Giuseppe Pisanelli | Historical Right | (1862–1863) |
| Minister of Finance | Marco Minghetti | Historical Right | (1862–1863) |
| Minister of War | Alessandro Della Rovere | Military | (1862–1863) |
| Minister of the Navy | Giovanni Ricci | Military | (1862–1863) |
| Minister of the Navy | Orazio Di Negro | Military | (1863–1863) |
| Minister of Agriculture, Industry and Commerce | Giovanni Manna | Historical Right | (1862–1863) |
| Minister of Public Works | Luigi Federico Menabrea | Historical Right | (1862–1863) |
| Minister of Public Education | Michele Amari | Historical Right | (1862–1863) |
