= Efisio Cugia =

Italian politician and general

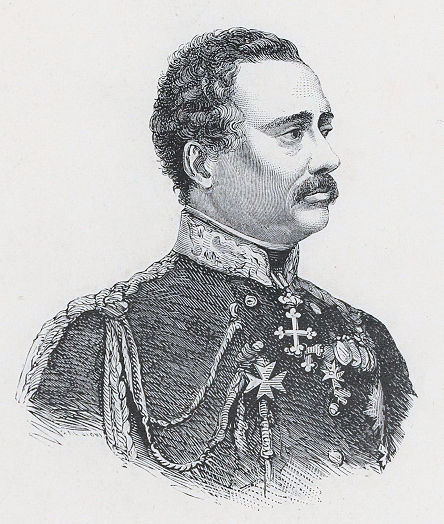

Minister of War
- In office 22 August 1866 – 10 April 1867
- Preceded by: Ignazio De Genova di Pettinengo
- Succeeded by: Genova Giovanni Thaon di Revel

Minister of the Navy
- In office 20 April 1863 – 28 September 1863
- Preceded by: Orazio Di Negro
- Succeeded by: Alfonso La Marmora

Deputy (Kingdom of Italy)
- In office 17 March 1861 – 13 February 1872

Deputy (Kingdom of Sardinia)
- In office 15 January 1855 – 17 March 1861

Efisio Cugia di Sant'Orsola (27 April 1818 in Cagliari – 13 February 1872 in Rome) was an Italian general and politician.

== Military career ==
Born into a family of Sardinian nobility, he embarked on a military career. After completing his studies at the it: Accademia Reale di Torino, he was appointed Second Lieutenant in the artillery. In 1848 he participated in the first Italian War of Independence and on May 30, in the battle of Goito, he was wounded, which earned him a silver medal of military valor. He went on to earn a second at the battle of Novara.

During the Second Italian War of Independence. he fought alongside General Enrico Cialdini in the IV division, earning the knight's cross in the Military Order of Savoy for his bravery at the battle of Palestro. After the armistice of Villafranca, he was assigned by king Vittorio Emanuele II to organize the military college of Milan.

General in 1860, he was chosen as chief of staff of the army corps; appointed on 12 December of the same year as director for war affairs in southern Italy, relinquishing this post to Genova Giovanni Thaon di Revel when Vittorio Emanuele II, assigned him instead the position of extraordinary commissioner in Sicily, which he held until 21 August 1862.

In 1866 he commanded the VIII Division at the Battle of Custoza as a lieutenant general. Subsequently, up to his death in 1872, Cugia held the office of first aide-de-camp to the then crown prince, and later king, Umberto I.

== Political career ==
During the fifth legislature of the Subalpine Parliament he was elected to represent the constituency of Lanusei, which renewed his mandate also in the sixth. In the seventh he represented Senorbì. In the eighth legislature - the first of the new Kingdom of Italy - he returned to Lanusei, while in the ninth, tenth and eleventh he chose Macomer, although he was also re-elected several times in Lanusei.

He was Prefect of Palermo, in charge of infantry and cavalry weapons during the ministry led by Manfredo Fanti. He held the position of Minister of the Navy in the first Minghetti government from 20 April 1863. As Navy Minister he instituted a school of cannonry on board the frigate Partenope and commissioned two armoured gunboats, later named the Alfredo Cappellini and the Faà di Bruno.

He then served as Minister of War in the second Ricasoli government from 22 August 1866. Under his administration, the War School was established in Turin. He also established a commission of enquiry into the reasons for the poor military performance in the Third Italian War of Independence.

Cugia died in Rome on 13 February 1872. He was buried in the family chapel in the monumental cemetery of Bonaria in Cagliari.

== Honours ==
Knight Grand Cross of the Order of Saints Maurice and Lazarus - ribbon for ordinary uniform

Knight Grand Cross of the Order of Saints Maurice and Lazarus
— 9 May 1867

Grand Officer of the Military Order of Savoy - ribbon for ordinary uniform

Grand Officer of the Military Order of Savoy
— 30 December 1866

Silver Medal of Military Valor - ribbon for ordinary uniform

Silver Medal of Military Valor
"distinguished conduct in the Battle of Goito"
— 30 May 1848

Silver Medal of Military Valor - ribbon for ordinary uniform

Silver Medal of Military Valor
"distinguished conduct in the Battle of Novara"
— 23 March 1849
