= Carlo Petitti di Roreto =

Italian politician

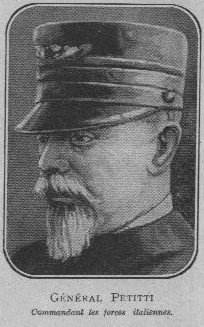
- Born: 18 December 1862; Turin, Piedmont, Italy
- Died: 27 January 1933 (aged 70); Turn, Piedmont, Italy
- Military career
- Allegiance: Kingdom of Italy
- Branch: Royal Italian Army
- Commands: XXIII Corps
- Conflicts: Italo-Turkish War; World War I: Monastir offensive

Carlo Petitti di Roreto (1862-1933) was an Italian general who was most notable during his service in the Italo-Turkish War and World War I.

== Biography ==
Carlo Petitti di Roreto was the son of a noble Piedmontese family, his grandfather was Carlo Ilarione Petitti di Roreto, an economist and writer and he was the nephew of Senator Agostino Petitti Bagliani di Roreto.

After embarking on a military career at the end of the nineteenth century, he participated in the clashes of the First World War, where from 4 June to 29 October 1915, he obtained command of the 1st Infantry Division as a general. In 1916 he obtained command of the 35th Division, taking possession of it at 3.30 pm on 15 May that year near Malga Zolle, on the southern side of Monte Toraro, precisely on the occasion of the start of the Austrian offensive on the highlands. He was in command of the Italian expeditionary force in Macedonia from August 1916 to June 1917.

From 1918, he was promoted to general of the army corps, he obtained the command of the XXIII Corps with specifically divisions 28 and 61, which during the Second Battle of the Piave River operated on the right bank of the Piave from Croce di Piave to the sea. On 2 November 1918 he became governor of Trieste and Venezia Giulia, keeping the post until July 1919.

At the end of the First World War, he obtained the appointment as general commander of the Carabinieri on 25 August 1919, remaining in office until 29 October 1921 .

In December 1919 he was appointed Senator of the Kingdom of Italy.

In politics an active exponent of the traditional liberal currents, he was a personality with a gruff trait, even haughty in the opinion of foreign observers (often prejudicedly hostile, or prejudiced, for their own interests) not accustomed to the "Piedmontese" character, but considered a good administrator and a skilled mediator, as proved in Macedonia and Venezia Giulia.

Edoardo Schott, war correspondent in Thessaloniki called him "a haughty Italian of high Piedmontese nobility".

He died in Turin in 1933.

== Awards ==
- Military Order of Savoy, Knight

In the battle of Misrata, on 8 July 1912, as commander of the right wing of the troops of the mixed Bragata (50 infantry and mountain battery), he was able to impart wise directives to the commanders of the dependent units, in order to be able to achieve the objective assigned to the regiment in the prescribed time, despite the fierce resistance opposed to him by the enemy, the difficulties of time and connection, and the losses suffered. Even in the fight in Gheran on 20 July 1912 he knew how to give wise dispositions and behaved like a brave one.

— Royal Decree 16 March 1913

- Military Order of Savoy, Commander

After having directed a calm and daring retreat, he held firm, with his valiant impulse, on the positions entrusted to him to resist to the bitter end, his troops although decimated by very violent bombardments and repelled the numerous and strong attacks of the enemy inflicting huge losses. Campomolon, 18–19 May - Novegno, 1–10 June 1916. ".

— Royal Decree 28 December 1916

- Military Order of Savoy, Grand Order

Commander of an Army Corps operating in a very delicate sector due to the particular nature of the terrain and the special defensive function due to him, he knew, with high competence, with tireless alacrity, with a fervent feeling of love for his country, to prepare him for supreme tests, in the battle of the Piave, after nine days of heroic resistance, lead it to victory, moving immediately afterwards to the reconquest of a large territory and thus returning to the homeland a strip of land trampled on by the enemy and widely expanding the defenses of Venice. Basso Piave, 8 November 1917 - 6 July 1918.

— Royal Decree 19 September

- Medal of Military Valor

Commander of a group of corps from the Isonzo to the Piave I explain the maximum activity to overcome the very serious crisis. He personally and boldly threw himself into the fray at the head of our rearguards to hold back the enemy; admirable example of value to all dependent troops .. Isonzo-Piave, October–November 1917. Division commander in Macedonia, he showed excellent military qualities in personally taking care of the defensive situation of the sector entrusted to him, contemptuous of any danger, in numerous reconnaissance and inspections on the front lines, even during enemy bombings. Not slightly injured, he did not give up the command that had been entrusted to him, not taking care of himself, but only of the fulfillment of his duty. Monastir (Macedonia) November–December 1916.

- Order of Saints Maurice and Lazarus, Commander (30 December 1919)
- Order of Saints Maurice and Lazarus, Knight
- Order of the Crown of Italy, Grand Gross
- War Merit Cross
- Commemorative Medal for the Italo-Turkish War 1911-1912
- Commemorative Medal for the Italo-Austrian War 1915–1918
- Commemorative Medal of the Unity of Italy
- Allied Victory Medal

=== Foreign awards ===
- France: Legion of Honour
- France: Croix de guerre 1914–1918
- Serbia: Order of the White Eagle

== Bibliography ==
Carlo Petitti di Roreto, on Sapienza.it De Agostini Carlo Petitti di Roreto, on Senators of Italy Senate of the Republic
