= Siege of Novara =

Siege of Novara may refer to:

- Siege of Novara (1495), during the First Italian War
- Siege of Novara (1500), during the Second Italian War
- Siege of Novara (1734), during the War of the Polish Succession

== See also ==
- Battle of Novara
