= Giuseppe Pisanelli =

Italian politician

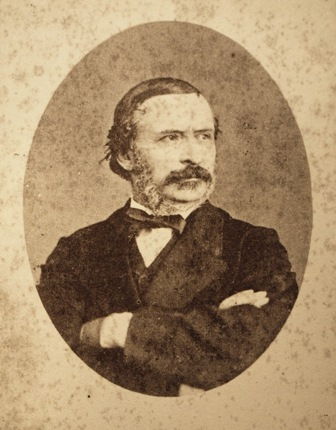

Minister of Justice
- In office 8 December 1862 – 28 September 1864
- Prime Minister: Luigi Carlo Farini; Marco Minghetti
- Preceded by: Raffaele Conforti
- Succeeded by: Giuseppe Vacca

Member of the Chamber of Deputies (Kingdom of Italy)
- In office 18 February 1861 – 2 May 1880

Giuseppe Pisanelli (Tricase, 23 September 1812 – Naples, 5 April 1879) was an Italian jurist and politician.

== Early life ==
He was born in Tricase to Michelangelo Pisanelli and Angela Mellone. In 1830 he moved to Naples, where he studied law at the University of Naples, graduating in 1832. He also frequented the literary salons of the city, in particular that of Carlo Poerio, a proponent of constitutional liberalism who had just returned from exile, and he formed friendships with many figures at the heart of the Risorgimento, such as it:Giuseppe Massari, Pasquale Stanislao Mancini and it:Antonio Scialoja.

== Political career ==
During the Sicilian revolution of 1848 he served in the Sicilian Parliament as a representative of the province of Terra d'Otranto and later fled into exile in Turin, Paris, and London. He was Minister of Justice in the Kingdom of the Two Sicilies in the government of Giuseppe Garibaldi in 1860.

After Italian unification, he was a deputy of the Kingdom of Italy in the IX, X, XI, XII and XIIIth legislatures. Together with senator it:Cataldo Nitti he fought for construction of the Naval Arsenal of Taranto as a key development in building the naval power of the country. He also served as Minister of Justice in the Farini government and the first Minghetti government.

He contributed to the drafting of the Italian Civil Code of 1865 and drafted a draft Code of Civil Procedure, the first to come into force in the newly formed kingdom.

From the last part of the IXth legislature (December 1866) to the end of the XIth (September 1874) he was vice-president of the Chamber and president of the elections board. In 1867–69 he was president of the parliamentary commission of inquiry into the conditions of the province of Palermo, established following the Palermo revolt of 1866. He was, finally, president of the parliamentary commission of inquiry into the operations of the Tobacco Registry, established in summer of 1869, investigating corruption among parliamentarians in the contracting of the tobacco monopoly to a consortium of financiers, decided by the government led by Luigi Federico Menabrea in 1868. The final report of the commission exonerated the deputy involved, Giuseppe Civinini.

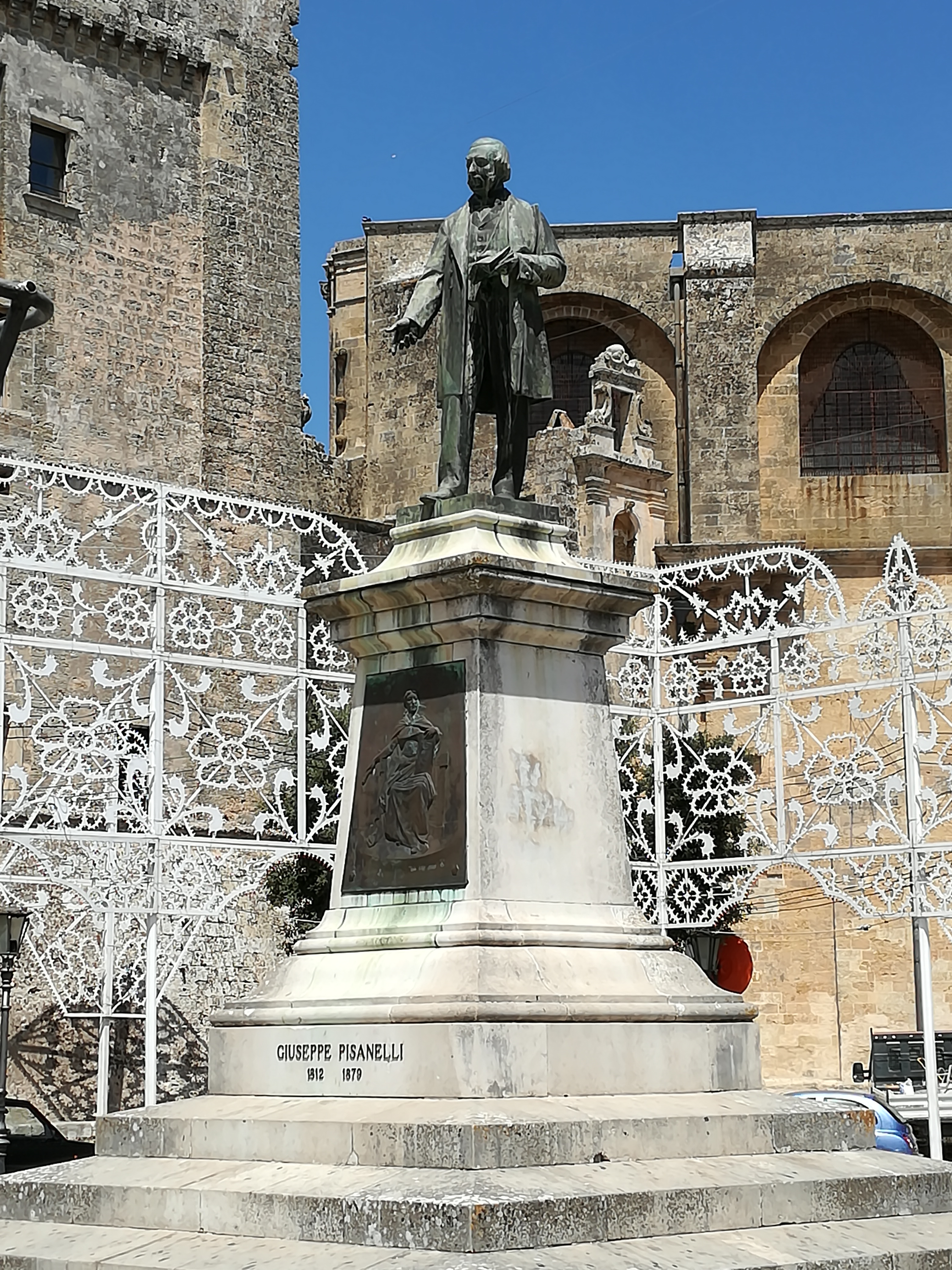
Statue of Giuseppe Pisanelli, piazza Pisanelli, Tricase

== Family life ==
In 1869 he married the widow Florentine Bianca Naldini, already a widow, informally adopting her son, it:Alfredo Codacci Pisanelli, later a jurist and deputy of the Kingdom of Italy. Alfredo’ sister Elisa Codacci Pisanelli married Vito Sansonetti, university professor and jurist.
