= Battle of Novara =

Battle of Novara may refer to:

- Battle of Novara (1500), a battle between France and Milan during the Second Italian War
- Battle of Novara (1513), a battle between the Holy League and France, within the War of the League of Cambrai
- Battle of Novara (1821), between Sardinian regulars and Piedmontese liberals
- Battle of Novara (1849), a battle between the Austrian Empire and Kingdom of Sardinia, within the Italian unification wars

== See also ==
- Siege of Novara
