= Orazio Di Negro =

Italian politician and admiral

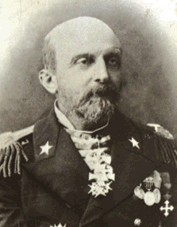

Minister of the Navy
- In office 25 January 1863 – 20 April 1863
- Preceded by: Giovanni Ricci
- Succeeded by: Efisio Cugia

Senator
- In office 28 November 1861 – 2 November 1872

Marquis Orazio Di Negro (Genoa, 10 February 1809 – Genoa, 2 November 1872) was an Italian politician and admiral, who served as Minister of the Navy of the Kingdom of Italy in the Farini and first Minghetti governments.

== Sardinian navy ==
Orazio was the son of the Marquis Lazzaro Francesco and his wife Teresa Giustiniani. He set out on a career in the Royal Sardinian Navy. Born into an ancient family of the Genoese nobility, he entered the Genoa naval school in 1820, from which he graduated with the rank of ensign 2nd class in 1824. In 1825 he participated in the expedition against Tripoli on the frigate it:Commercio di Genova. He rose rapidly through the ranks, being promoted to second lieutenant in 1830, lieutenant second class in 1835, first class in 1837, first lieutenant in 1839, and captain second class in 1842. He was awarded the silver medal for military valor for having contributed to the rescue of the crew of the Greek brig Alessandro, shipwrecked in a storm in the port of Genoa.

Commander of the pyrocorvette Tripoli during the First Italian War of Independence, he made his mark during the expedition of the small Sardinian team in the Adriatic (1848-49), in particular in the operations in the port of Piran, where he managed to free a Venetian vessel captured by the Austrians under fire from enemy batteries, and for which he was awarded the second silver medal for military valor. Promoted to frigate captain in 1848, he became second class captain the following year and first class in 1852, assuming command of the Sardinian fleet sailing in the Mediterranean.

In 1855-1856, with the rank of captain and had command of the Sardinian fleet, composed of the screw frigates Carlo Alberto and Euridice and the wheeled frigate Governolo which took part in the Crimean expedition. With his ships he transported the Piedmontese expeditionary force, under Alessandro Ferrero La Marmora, which set sail from Genoa on 28 April 1855 and reached Balaklava on 28 May. During this mission in the East, he achieved the reputation of an excellent maneuverer, and at the end of the operations he was awarded the Commander's Cross of the Military Order of Savoy. Promoted to rear admiral in 1859, he joined the Permanent Congress of the Navy, and then became director of the maritime arsenal of Genoa. He was promoted to vice admiral on 18 April 1860.

== Italian navy ==
At the end of the Piedmontese expedition in central Italy, while the commander of the Sardinian fleet Carlo Pellion di Persano was still engaged in the siege of Gaeta, the question of the merger between the former navy of the Kingdom of the Two Sicilies and that of the Kingdom of Sardinia emerged. Cavour decided to entrust Di Negro with command of the new Naval Department of Naples, a decision opposed by Persano, who warned Cavour that Garibaldi would never get along with him. On 21 November 1860 Cavour wrote to Luigi Carlo Farini, recently appointed lieutenant general for the southern mainland, announcing his appointment as commander of the southern department of the navy.

In Naples the ranks of officers had been enormously expanded following the promotions granted by Garibaldi and had to be drastically reduced. It was also necessary to cut the expenses of the arsenal, where the measures taken in favor of the workers during Garibaldi’s dictatorship entailed a very heavy burden on the State. Furthermore, the naval forces had to be reorganized and increased through a levy of sailors, the arming of all available boats, and the start of new naval construction. In April 1861, tired of the opposition he encountered in carrying out his duties, he resigned, retiring to private life in his hometown.

== Later career ==
On 20 November of the same year he received the nomination as Senator of the Kingdom of Italy and the rank of vice admiral. He was sworn in on 28 November, but was rarely present in the Senate due to his health.

In 1863 he was invited to head the Ministry of the Navy during the Farini and Minghetti I governments. Due to his worsening health, he resigned after three months and died in Genoa on 2 November 1872.

== Honours ==
Orazio Di Negro received a number of Italian and foreign honours:

Commendatore dell'Ordine militare di Savoia - ribbon for ordinary uniform

Commander of the Military Order of Savoy

Medaglia d'argento al valor militare (2 concessioni) - ribbon for ordinary uniform

Silver Medal of Military Valor (twice)

Commendatore dell'Ordine dei Santi Maurizio e Lazzaro - ribbon for ordinary uniform

Commander of the Order of Saints Maurice and Lazarus

Commendatore dell'Ordine della Legion d'onore (Francia) - ribbon for ordinary uniform

Commander of the Légion d’Honneur (France)

Commendatore dell'Ordine di San Gregorio Magno (Stato Pontificio) - ribbon for ordinary uniform

Commander of the Order of Saint Gregory the Great (Papal States)

Compagno dell'Ordine del Bagno (Regno Unito) - ribbon for ordinary uniform

Companion of the Order of the Bath (United Kingdom)

Medaglia britannica della Guerra di Crimea (Gran Bretagna) - ribbon for ordinary uniform

Crimea Medal (United Kingdom)

Cavaliere di IV classe dell'Ordine di Sant'Anna (Impero di Russia) - ribbon for ordinary uniform

Knight IV class of the Order of Saint Anna (Russia)

Cavaliere di V classe dell'Ordine di Medjidié (Impero Ottomano) - ribbon for ordinary uniform

Knight V class of the Order of the Medjidie (Ottoman Empire)

Cavaliere di II classe dell'Ordine di Nichan Iftikar (Impero Ottomano) - ribbon for ordinary uniform

Knight II class of the Nichan Iftikar (Ottoman Empire)

Croce d'argento dell'Ordine del Salvatore (Grecia) - ribbon for ordinary uniform

Silver cross of the Order of the Redeemer (Greece)
