= Associazione Agraria Subalpina =

The Associazione Agraria Subalpina (Subalpine Agrarian Association), was founded on 31 May 1842, under the sponsorship of Carlo Alberto, king of Piedmont-Sardinia, by a group of 36 intellectuals, landowners and politicians belonging to the Piedmontese nobility and bourgeoisie. They included Camillo Benso di Cavour, Carlo Ilarione Petitti di Roreto, Cesare Alfieri di Sostegno (its first president) and Giovenale Vegezzi Ruscalla (its first secretary). Its primary aim was the promotion of efficient agricultural practices in Piedmont, but in the absence of effective political organisation in the kingdom—where there was no parliament, no political parties, no elections and no free press prior to the Statuto Albertino of 1848—it also provided a focus for passionate political debate.
