= Ignazio De Genova di Pettinengo =

Italian politician and general

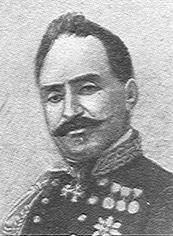

Minister of War
- In office 31 December 1865 – 20 June 1866
- Preceded by: Agostino Petitti Bagliani di Roreto
- In office 20 June 1866 – 22 August 1866
- Succeeded by: Efisio Cugia

Senator
- In office 22 May 1868 – 2 November 1896

Member of the Chamber of Deputies
- In office 18 February 1861 – 13 February 1867

Ignazio De Genova di Pettinengo (Biella, 28 February 1813 – Moncalieri, 2 November 1896) was an Italian politician and general. He was Minister of War during the Third Italian War of Independence.

== Early life and career ==
Pettingo was a career soldier in the artillery. He fought in the First Italian War of Independence and was promoted to colonel in 1848. In 1850 he was appointed deputy commander of the Royal Military Academy of Turin. In June 1851 he was appointed general of the army and in 1858 he was appointed major general. On 7 September 1860 he reached the rank of lieutenant general.

He was elected deputy to the Chamber of the Kingdom of Italy from the constituency of Fossano in February 1861 and re-elected in 1865. From September 1861 he was the king's lieutenant general in the Sicilian provinces, until 5 January 1862. In 1864 he was President of the Superior Council for educational and military education institutions.

== Minister of War ==
From 31 December 1865 to 22 August 1866 he was Minister of War of the Kingdom of Italy, in the third La Marmora and second Ricasoli governments. When he accepted the office his main priority was to reduce military spending, but within months the Austro-Prussian War broke out, which Italy soon joined in the side of Prussia in the Third Italian War of Independence. He therefore found himself rapidly reversing some of the measures he had instituted. Among the criticisms made of his tenure was that mobilisation was too slow; he reduced the rate of the fresh call-up of conscripts while authorising release for those already conscripted. Nevertheless, he did ensure that 565,000 men were called up for the war effort.

He was appointed senator of the Kingdom in 1868. He held the position of General Commander of the Carabinieri from 18 May to 3 November 1877.

== Honours ==
Knight Grand Cross of the Order of Saints Maurice and Lazarus - ribbon for ordinary uniform

Knight Grand Cross of the Order of Saints Maurice and Lazarus

Grand Cordon of the Order of the Crown of Italy - ribbon for ordinary uniform

Grand Cordon of the Order of the Crown of Italy

Commander of the Military Order of Savoy - ribbon for ordinary uniform

Commander of the Military Order of Savoy
— 12 June 1856

2 silver medals of military valour - ribbon for ordinary uniform

2 silver medals of military valour

Knight of the Order of the White Eagle (Russian Empire) - ribbon for ordinary uniform

Knight of the Order of the White Eagle (Russian Empire)

Grand Officer of the Order of San Marino (Republic of San Marino) - ribbon for ordinary uniform

Grand Officer of the Order of San Marino (Republic of San Marino)

Commander of the Legion of Honour (France) - ribbon for ordinary uniform

Commander of the Legion of Honour (France)
