= Giovenale Vegezzi Ruscalla =

Giovenale Vegezzi Ruscalla (4 December 1799, Turin, Italy - December 1885, Turin), was a liberal Italian journalist, foreign honorary member of the Romanian Academy, and secretary to the Subalpine Agrarian Association. He traveled to Transylvania and Banat on a study trip in 1830 and was an honorary citizen as a Romanian diplomat. He translated poems of the Romanian poet and playwright Vasile Alecsandri and taught a history course and Romanian literature at the University of Turin. At the Congress of Paris 1856 Vegezzi Ruscalla successfully debated in favour of Romanian independence (out of Moldavia and Wallachia).

== Bibliography ==
- Predescu, Lucian, Romanian Encyclopedia. Thinking, Saeculum Publishing, Bucharest, 1999 ISBN 973-9399-03-7
- Suciu, Dumitru, Austro-history and national struggle of the Romanians in Transylvania (1848 - 1867), Albatros Publishing House, Bucharest, 2000 ISBN 973-24-0691-7 pp. 299–317
