= Luigi Spagnolli =

Italian politician

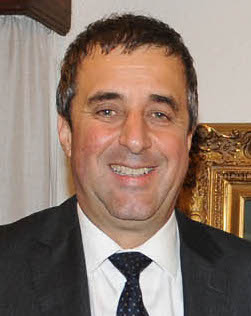

Mayor of Bolzano
- In office 11 November 2005 – 24 September 2015
- Preceded by: Giovanni Benussi
- Succeeded by: Renzo Caramaschi

Member of the Senate
- Incumbent
- Assumed office 13 October 2022
- Constituency: Bolzano

Personal details
- Born: 10 February 1960 (age 66) Bolzano, Trentino-Alto Adige, Italy
- Party: The Daisy (2002-2007); Democratic Party (since 2007)
- Education: University of Florence
- Profession: teacher, public administrator

Luigi Spagnolli (born 10 February 1960) is an Italian politician.

He is a member of the Democratic Party and served as Mayor of Bolzano for three terms from 2005 to 2015.

== See also ==
- 2005 Italian local elections
- 2010 Italian local elections
- 2015 Italian local elections
- List of mayors of Bolzano

Political offices
Preceded by Giovanni Benussi	Mayor of Bolzano; 2005–2015	Succeeded by Renzo Caramaschi
