= Giovanni Ricci (politician) =

Italian naval captain and politician

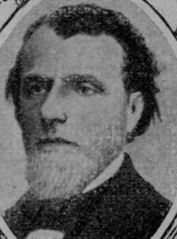

Minister of the Navy
- In office 8 December 1862 – 22 January 1863
- Preceded by: Carlo Pellion di Persano
- Succeeded by: Orazio Di Negro

Senator
- In office 2 March 1874 – 5 October 1892

Member of the Chamber of Deputies
- In office 18 February 1861 – 2 March 1874

Member of the Chamber of Deputies of the Kingdom of Sardinia
- In office 2 April 1860 – 17 December 1860

Giovanni Ricci (29 March 1813 in Genoa – 5 October 1892 in Oviglio) was an Italian naval captain and politician.

== Family background ==
Giovanni Ricci belonged to the noble Genoese house of the Marquises Ricci; his brothers were the Marquis Vincenzo Ricci, who served as a minister in several governments of the Kingdom of Sardinia: diplomat and senator Alberto Ricci; and General Giuseppe Ricci, Deputy for La Spezia.

== Naval and political career ==
He graduated from the naval school in 1828 and rose through the ranks until he became Navy officer until he reached the rank of captain in 1855. He retired from the navy in 1858. He was elected deputy for Genoa first in the Chamber of Deputies of the Kingdom of Sardinia, and then the Chamber of the Kingdom of Italy. He was appointed Minister of the Navy in the Farini government on 8 December 1862, but resigned on 22 January 1863 and was replaced shortly afterwards by Orazio Di Negro.

He was appointed to the Senate in 1873.

== Honours ==
Officer of the Military Order of Savoy - ribbon for ordinary uniform

Officer of the Military Order of Savoy
— 12 June 1856

Knight of the Order of Saints Maurice and Lazarus - ribbon for ordinary uniform

Knight of the Order of Saints Maurice and Lazarus
