= Carlo Ilarione Petitti di Roreto =

Italian politician

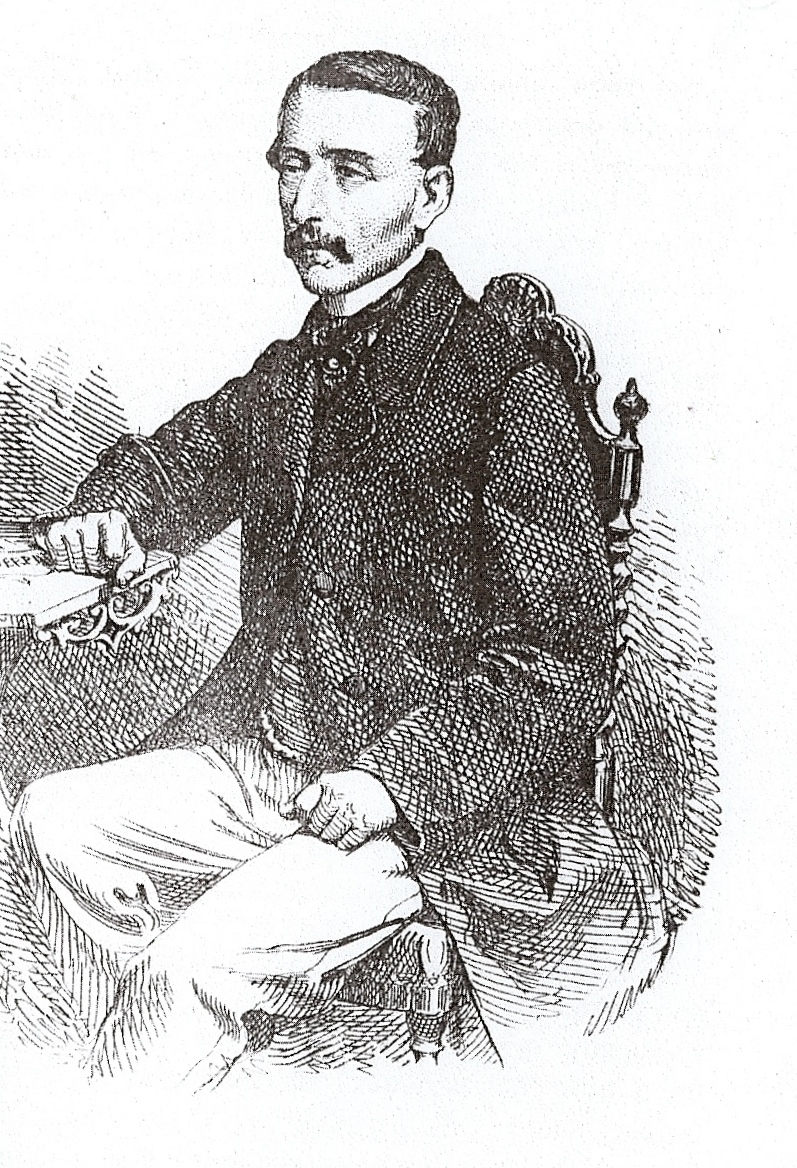
- Born: October 21, 1790; Turin, Kingdom of Sardinia
- Died: April 10, 1850 (aged 59); Turin, Kingdom of Sardinia
- Other name: Count of Roreto
- Citizenship: Italian
- Education: University of Genoa
- Occupations: Economist, academic, writer, counsellor of state, senatorv

Carlo Ilarione Petitti count of Roreto (21 October 1790 – 10 April 1850) was an Italian economist, academic, writer, counsellor of state, and senator of the Kingdom of Sardinia. He is seen as a prominent figure in the Italian Risorgimento.

== Life ==
Carlo Ilarione Petitti di Roreto was born in Turin on 21 October 1790, son of the count Giuseppe Antonio Petitti di Roreto (1729–1795) and of the noblewoman Innocenza Gabriella Ferrero di Ponziglione e Borgo d'Ales (1767–1797).

In 1813 at Alessandria he married the noblewoman Maria Teresa Gabriella Genna of the counts of Cocconato (1791–1826); the marriage produced four children: Alessandro (1813–1841), Agostino (1814–1890), Maurizio (1816–1852), and Giuseppe (1824–1886).

After graduating in law from the University of Genoa in 1816, he entered the administration of the Kingdom of Sardinia, for which he had already worked on an unpaid basis, becoming vice-intendant general of Savoy at Chambéry.

In 1819 he was made intendant general of Asti and in 1826 of Cuneo. In 1831 he was appointed to the newly founded Council of State, an institution whose creation he had promoted to the king; in 1836 he became vice-president of the higher commission of statistics, also established by Charles Albert of Savoy, and in 1839 he was appointed to the Accademia delle Scienze di Torino. In 1842 he was a founder member, along with Cavour, of the Associazione Agraria di Torino.

He was identified by Metternich, together with Vincenzo Gioberti, Massimo d'Azeglio and Cesare Balbo as one of the most eminent Piedmontese Liberals of the time and is regarded as one of the leading intellectuals in the cultural and political spheres of the Risogimento and was described by Gian Mario Bravo as one of the few who emerged not so much because of their aristocratic titles or through their political activities (though both did apply in his case), but above all because of his work as an academic, as an economist, and as a commentator and journalist. Thus he came to be considered by many as the major inspirer of the Albertine reform programme. His 1845 essay on the advantages to be gained by the development of railways received great attention in political circles both at home and abroad.

In 1848 he was made a senator of the Kingdom of Sardinia.

Carlo Ilarione Petitti died two years later, on 10 April 1850, in Turin. His death was brought about by podagra, a painful disease from which he had suffered for many years.

== Principal writings ==
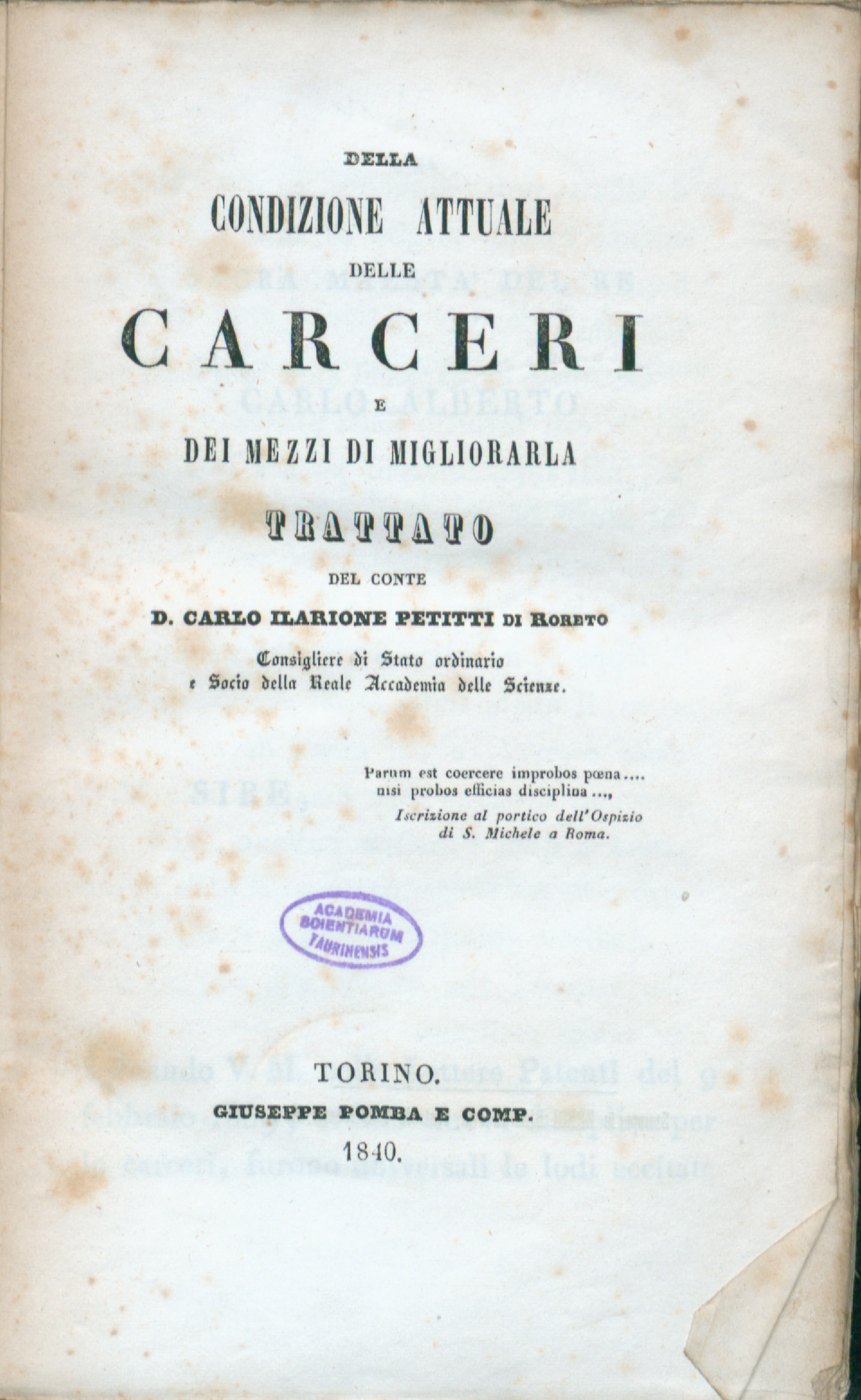
Della condizione attuale delle carceri e dei mezzi di migliorarla, 1840

- Saggio sul buon governo della mendicità, degli istituti di beneficenza e delle carceri, Bocca, Turin, 1837.
- Della condizione attuale delle carceri e dei mezzi di migliorarla (in Italian). Torino: Pomba. 1840.
- Sul lavoro de' fanciulli nelle manifatture, Lettere al direttore delle "Letture di Famiglia", Turin, 1942–1944;
- Delle strade ferrate italiane e del miglior ordinamento di esse. Cinque discorsi, Tipografia Elvetica, Capolago, 1845;
- Delle più probabili future condizioni del commercio ligure. Tre lettere a Michele Erede, Tip. Sordomuti, Genoa, 1847;
- Considerazioni sopra la necessità di una riforma de' tributi con alcuni cenni su certe spese dello Stato, Successori Pomba, Turin, 1850;
- Del gioco del lotto considerato ne' suoi effetti morali, politici ed economici, Stamperia Reale, Turin, 1853;
- Opere Scelte, Fondazione Luigi Einaudi, Turin, 1969.

== Honours ==
Petitti was made Commendatore dell'Ordine dei SS. Maurizio e Lazzaro in 1836 and Cavaliere dell'Ordine civile di Savoia in 1837.

== Bibliography ==
- Camillo Cavour, Des chemins de fer en Italie par le comte Petitti, conseiller d'Etat du Royaume de Sardaigne, Revue Nouvelle, Paris, Tom. VIII, 1 May 1846;
- Pasquale Stanislao Mancini, Notizia della vita e degli studi di Carlo Ilarione Petitti, introduzione all'opera postuma di C.I. Petitti, Del giuoco del lotto, Turin, 1850;
- Vittorio Bersezio, Il regno di Vittorio Emanuele II. Trent'anni di vita italiana, Roux, Turin, 1878, libro I;
- Arturo Codignola, Dagli albori della libertà al proclama di Moncalieri (Lettere del Conte Ilarione Petitti di Roreto a Michele Erede dal marzo 1846 all'Aprile del 1850), in "Biblioteca di Storia Italiana Recente" (1800–1870), Turin, 1907–1932, Vol. XIII;
- Mario Battistini, Documenti italiani nel Belgio. La corrispondenza del conte Ilarione Petitti di Roreto con Adolfo Quetelet, in "Rassegna Storica del Risorgimento", Rome, 1936, Fascicolo VIII;
- Adolfo Colombo, Lettere di I. Petitti di Roreto a Vincenzo Gioberti (1841–1850), in "Carteggi di Vincenzo Gioberti", Regio Istituto per la Storia del Risorgimento Italiano, Rome, 1936;
- Adolfo Colombo, Gli albori del Regno di Vittorio Emanuele II secondo nuovi documenti, in "Rassegna Storica del Risorgimento", Rome, 1936, Fascicolo X e Fascicolo XI;
- Gian Mario Bravo, Profilo intellettuale e politico di Carlo Ilarione Petitti di Roreto (1790–1850), in "Annali della Fondazione Luigi Einaudi", Turin 1968;
- Gian Mario Bravo, Nota Critica, in Carlo Ilarione Petitti di Roreto, Opere Scelte, Fondazione Luigi Einaudi, Turin, 1969.
- Anna Capelli, La buona compagnia. Utopia e realtà carceraria nell'Italia del Risorgimento, Franco Angeli, Milan, 1988;
- Paola Casana Testore, Introduzione, in Carlo Ilarione Petitti di Roreto, Lettere a L. Nomis di Cossilla ed a K. Mittermaier, Centro Studi Piemontesi, Turin, 1989;
- Anna Capelli, Il carcere degli intellettuali. Lettere di italiani a Karl Mittermaier (1835–1865), Franco Angeli, Milan, 1993;
- Giuseppe Crosa, Un intendente scomodo: C.I. Petitti di Roreto, in Asti nel sette-ottocento, Gribaudo Editore, Cavallermaggiore, 1993.
