= Gruber–De Gasperi Agreement =

1946 treaty between Austria and Italy

The Gruber–De Gasperi Agreement was a bilateral treaty that was signed by the foreign minister of Austria, Karl Gruber, and the prime minister of Italy, Alcide De Gasperi, on 5 September 1946. Recognized by international law, it granted the German-speaking population of the Province of South Tyrol the right to autonomy and to preserve its cultural identity and customs. It also recognized German and Italian as official languages.

People were granted the right to return to their original German given and family names, which had been abandoned by many during the Fascists' programme of forced assimilation.

== Content ==
1. German-speaking inhabitants of the Bolzano Province and of the neighbouring bilingual townships of the Trento Province will be assured complete equality of rights with the Italian-speaking inhabitants, within the framework of special provisions to safeguard the ethnical character and the cultural and economic development of the German-speaking element.
  In accordance with legislation already enacted or awaiting enactment the said German-speaking citizens will be granted in particular:
  1. elementary and secondary teaching in the mother-tongue;
  2. participation of the German and Italian languages in public offices and official documents, as well as in bilingual topographic naming;
  3. the right to re-establish German family names which were Italianized in recent years;
  4. equality of rights as regards the entering upon public offices, with a view to reaching a more appropriate proportion of employment between the two ethnical groups.
2. The populations of the above-mentioned zones will be granted the exercise of autonomous legislative and executive regional power. The frame within which the said provisions of autonomy will apply, will be drafted in consultation also with local representative German-speaking elements.
3. The Italian Government, with the aim of establishing good neighbourhood relations between Austria and Italy, pledges itself, in consultation with the Austrian Government and within one year from the signing of the present Treaty:
  1. to revise in a spirit of equity and broadmindedness the question of the options for citizenship resulting from the 1939 Hitler-Mussolini agreements;
  2. to find an agreement for the mutual recognition of the validity of certain degrees and University diplomas;
  3. to draw up a convention for the free passengers and goods transit between Northern and Eastern Tyrol both by rail and, to the greatest possible extent, by road;
  4. to reach special agreements aimed at facilitating enlarged frontier traffic and local exchanges of certain quantities of characteristic products and goods between Austria and Italy.
