= Renzo Caramaschi =

Italian politician

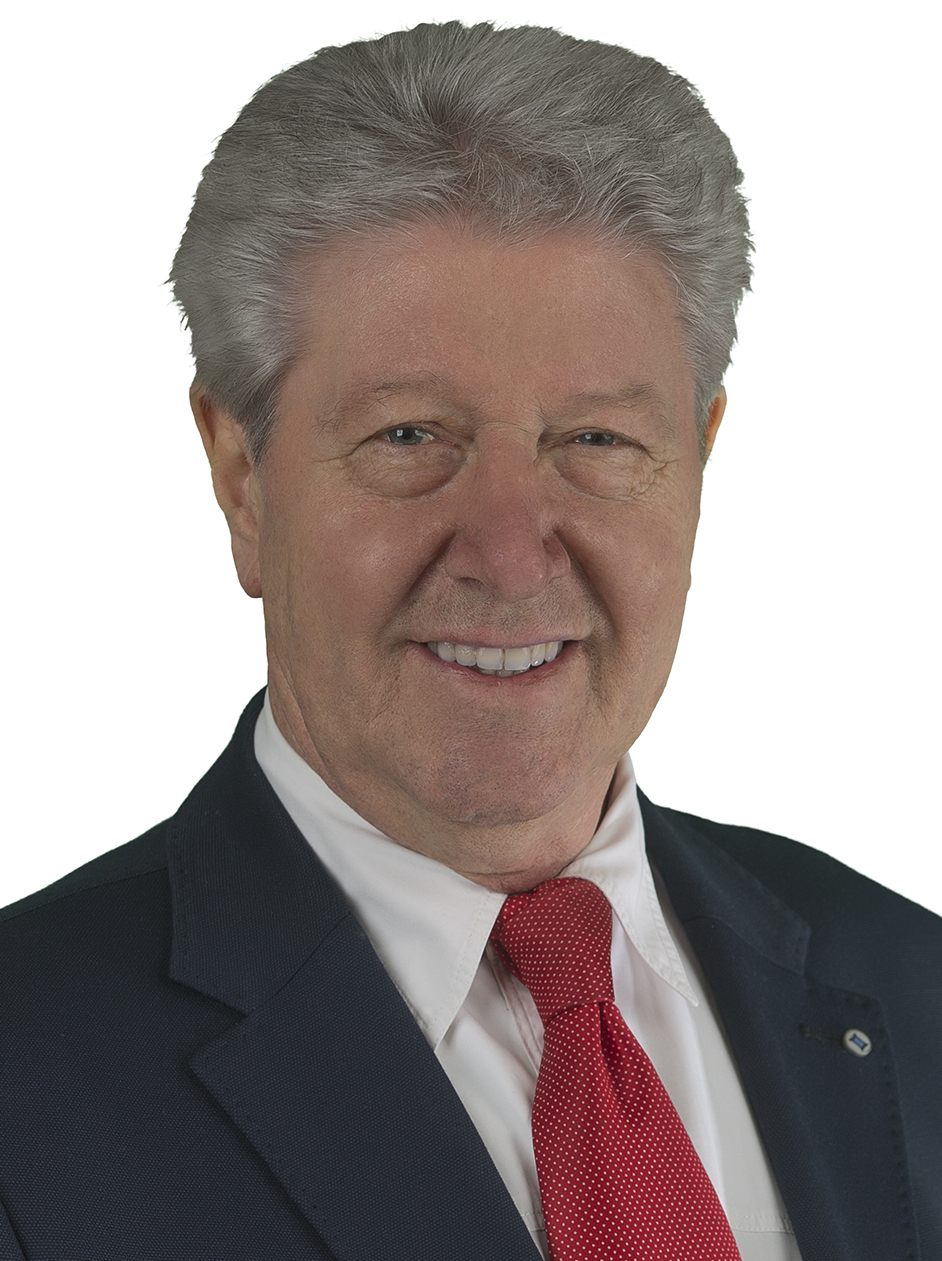

Mayor of Bolzano
- In office 23 May 2016 – 19 May 2025
- Preceded by: Luigi Spagnolli
- Succeeded by: Claudio Corrarati

Personal details
- Born: 4 March 1946 (age 80) Bolzano, Trentino-Alto Adige, Italy
- Party: Centre-left independent
- Education: University of Padua
- Profession: Public administrator

Renzo Caramaschi (born 4 March 1946) is an Italian politician.

He is an independent center-left politician and was elected Mayor of Bolzano in the 2016 local elections. He took office on 23 May 2016, and was re-elected for a second term in October 2020.

== See also ==
- 2016 Italian local elections
- 2020 Italian local elections
- List of mayors of Bolzano

Political offices
Preceded by Luigi Spagnolli	Mayor of Bolzano; 2016-2025	Succeeded by Claudio Corrarati
