= Agostino Petitti Bagliani di Roreto =

Italian general and politician

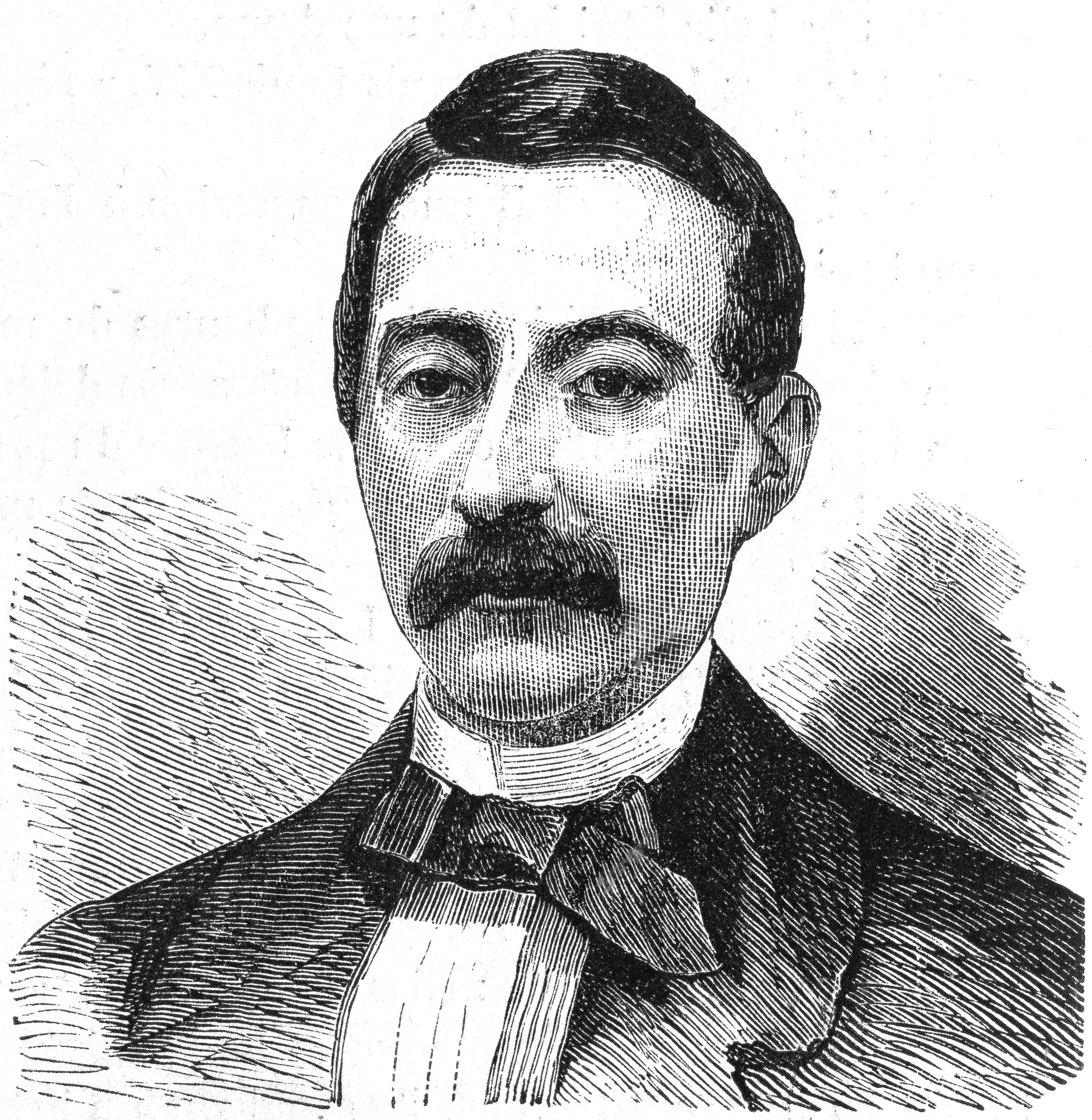

Minister of War
- In office 4 March 1862 – 8 December 1862
- Preceded by: Alessandro Della Rovere
- Succeeded by: Alessandro Della Rovere
- In office 28 September 1864 – 31 December 1865
- Preceded by: Alessandro Della Rovere
- Succeeded by: Ignazio De Genova di Pettinengo

Senator
- In office 1 December 1870 – 28 August 1890

Member of the Chamber of Deputies
- In office 18 February 1861 – 13 February 1867

Member of the Chamber of Deputies of the Kingdom of Italy
- In office 20 December 1849 – 17 December 1860

Agostino Petitti Bagliani, Count of Roreto (Turin, 13 December 1814 – Rome, 28 August 1890) was an Italian general and politician of the Risorgimento.

== Early life ==
Agostino Petitti Bagliani from Roreto belonged to a noble Piedmontese family originally from Cherasco. His father, Count Carlo Ilarione Petitti di Roreto, was an economist and writer, considered one of the most important movers behind the reforms of king Charles Albert of Sardinia while his mother was Gabriella Genna. He was enrolled at a young age at the it:Accademia Reale di Torino from which he emerged in 1833 with the rank of lieutenant. In 1848 he fought in the First Italian War of Independence, earning himself an honorable mention.

== Military career ==
In November of the same year he was promoted to major and with this rank he held the position of chief of staff of the 6th Division under General Alfonso La Marmora. In 1853 he was promoted to lieutenant colonel and appointed general secretary of the War Ministry. Chief of Staff in the Crimean War (1855 - 1856), in November 1858 he assumed command of the Field Artillery Regiment in Venaria Reale which he held until 26 April 1859.

In 1859 he took part in the Second Italian War of Independence, fighting alongside General La Marmora in the battles of Palestro, Magenta and Solferino; where he notably took part in the action at Madonna della Scoperta, about which he later wrote a memoir Madonna della Scoperta (Battle of San Martino, 24 June 1859) A Historical Tactical Study, edited by his nephew General Alfonso Petitti di Roreto and published posthumously in 1909. During this war he was promoted to major general and in 1860 to lieutenant general, becoming commander of the 3rd Division in Milan.

In 1866 he participated in the Third Italian War of Independence as adjutant general of the army and then as commander of the IV Army Corps. On 12 August 1866 he signed the armistice of Cormons on behalf of Italy with his Austrian counterpart Major General Baron it:Karl Möring.

At the end of the war he was appointed general commander of the Military Division of Alessandria and, in 1870, of the Military Division of Milan, retaining the high command of the divisions of Turin, Alessandria and Genoa.

== Political career ==
Petitti represented the Cherasco constituency in the Parliament of the Kingdom of Sardinia from 1849, and continued to represent it in the Chamber of Deputies of the Kingdom of Italy until 1867. He was appointed Minister of War in the first Rattazzi government (1862) and in the second government of Alfonso La Marmora (1864). His ministerial activity was characterized by important interventions to reorganize the army, including the merger of the corps of Garibaldi volunteers into the regular troops, and by the impetus given to the establishment of schools for the military and related educational programs.

Signing the unpopular armistice of Cormons probably cost him his seat in the Chamber of Deputies in 1867. His appointment as senator of the Kingdom was announced in 1870, in recognition of his services to national unity.

== Family ==
In 1860 he married Maria Bellotti of Milan (1835 - 1890) with whom he had two daughters Teresa Maria (1861 – 1917) and Vittoria Emanuela (1862 – 1956). He was also the uncle of senator Carlo Petitti di Roreto and general Alfonso Petitti di Roreto.

He retired in 1877 after 44 years of active military life and died in Rome on 28 August 1890.

== Honours ==
=== Italian honours ===
Grand Cordon of the Order of the Crown of Italy - ribbon for ordinary uniform

Grand Cordon of the Order of the Crown of Italy

Grand Cordon of the Order of Saints Maurice and Lazarus - ribbon for ordinary uniform

Grand Cordon of the Order of Saints Maurice and Lazarus

Officer of the Military Order of Savoy - ribbon for ordinary uniform

Officer of the Military Order of Savoy

=== Foreign honours ===
Knight Grand Cross of the Order of the Red Eagle (German Empire ) - ribbon for ordinary uniform

Knight Hrand Cross of the border of the Red Eagle (German Empire )

Knight of the Order of Saint Anna (Russia) - ribbon for ordinary uniform

Knight of the Order of Saint Anna (Russia)

Commander of the Legion of Honor (France) - ribbon for ordinary uniform

Commander of the Legion of Honor (France)

Companion of the Order of the Bath (United Kingdom) - ribbon for ordinary uniform

Companion of the Order of the Bath (United Kingdom)

Knight Grand Cross of the Order of the Immaculate Conception of Vila Viçosa (Portugal) - ribbon for ordinary uniform

Knight Grand Cross of the Order of the Immaculate Conception of Vila Viçosa (Portugal)

== Works ==
- Dell'amministrazione della giustizia penale militare negli anni 1861-62-63-64, Turin, 1865
- Madonna della Scoperta, Turin 1909
