= List of mayors of Bolzano =

Wikimedia project list

Mayor of Bolzano
- Sindaco di Bolzano; Bürgermeister von Bozen
- Incumbent; Claudio Corrarati since 19 May 2025
- Appointer: Popular election
- Term length: 5 years
- Website: Official website

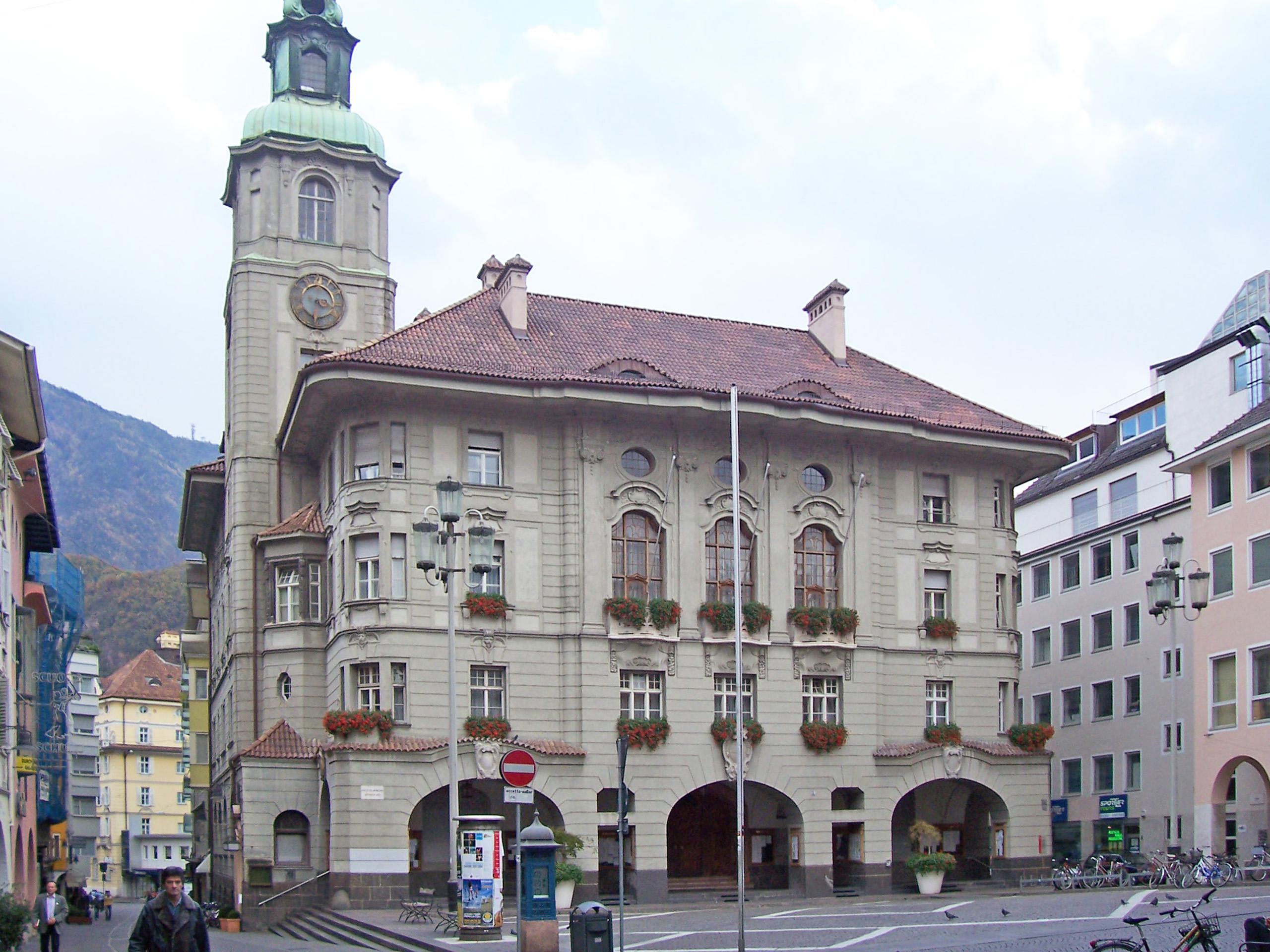
Bolzano's City Hall

The mayor of Bolzano is an elected politician who, along with the Bolzano's city council, is accountable for the strategic government of Bolzano in Trentino-Alto Adige/Südtirol, Italy, the capital city of South Tyrol.

The current mayor is Claudio Corrarati, elected in May 2025.

== Overview ==
According to the Italian Constitution, the mayor of Bolzano is member of the city council.

The mayor is elected by the population of Bolzano, who also elects the members of the city council, controlling the mayor's policy guidelines and is able to enforce his resignation by a motion of no confidence. The mayor is entitled to appoint and release the members of his government.

Since 1995 the mayor is elected directly by Bolzano's electorate: in all mayoral elections in Italy in cities with a population higher than 15,000 the voters express a direct choice for the mayor or an indirect choice voting for the party of the candidate's coalition. If no candidate receives at least 50% of votes, the top two candidates go to a second round after two weeks. The election of the City Council is based on a direct choice for the candidate with a preference vote: the candidate with the majority of the preferences is elected. The number of the seats for each party is determined proportionally.

== 1449–1948 ==
From 1449 onwards, when the earliest mayor, named Hans Trott, is recorded, the first citizen of Bolzano was called Bürgermeister. With the collapse of the Austro-Hungarian Empire at the end of World War I and the annexation of the Southern Tyrol by Italy in 1919–20, the burgomasters became sindaco (mayor).

From 1895 up to 1922, when Fascist squadrons occupied the town hall, the democratically elected Julius Perathoner was mayor, modernizing the city by sustaining a widespread urban renewal.

== Republic of Italy (since 1948) ==
=== City Council election (1948–1995) ===
From 1948 to 1995, the mayor of Bolzano was elected by the city council.

	Mayor	Term start	Term end	Party
1	Lino Ziller	27 July 1948	13 July 1957	DC
2	Giorgio Pasquali	13 July 1957	19 June 1968	DC
3	Giancarlo Bolognini	2 July 1968	26 August 1983	DC
4	Luigi de Guelmi	26 August 1983	1 October 1985	DC
5	Marcello Ferrari	1 October 1985	30 August 1988	DC
Special Prefectural Commissioner tenure (30 August 1988 – 4 August 1989)
6	Valentino Pasqualin	4 August 1989	3 November 1989 (Note: Died in office.)	DC
(5)	Marcello Ferrari	21 November 1989	19 July 1995	DC

=== Direct election (since 1995) ===
Since 1995, under provisions of new local administration law, the mayor of Bolzano is chosen by direct election.

	Mayor	Took office	Left office	Party	Coalition	Election
7	Giovanni Salghetti Drioli (b. 1941)	19 July 1995	27 June 2000	Ind	PDS • PdD • SVP • PPI	1995
7	Giovanni Salghetti Drioli (b. 1941)	27 June 2000	23 May 2005	Ind	DS • SDI • SVP • VGV	2000
8	Giovanni Benussi (b. 1948)	23 May 2005	22 June 2005 (Note: Benussi won the mayoral election only by 7 votes (50.01% of the popular vote). He later declined the position after the City Council did not approve his executive cabinet.)	Ind	AN • FI • LN	2005
Special Prefectural Commissioner tenure (23 June 2005 – 11 November 2005)
9	Luigi Spagnolli (b. 1960)	11 November 2005	19 May 2010	DL; PD	SVP • DS • DL • SDI • VGV • PRC	2005 (special)
9	Luigi Spagnolli (b. 1960)	19 May 2010	26 May 2015	DL; PD	SVP • PD • IdV • SEL • VGV • PRC	2010
9	Luigi Spagnolli (b. 1960)	26 May 2015	24 September 2015 (Note: Resigned after losing the majority in the City Council.)	DL; PD	SVP • PD and leftist lists	2015
Special Prefectural Commissioner tenure (25 September 2015 – 23 May 2016)
10	Renzo Caramaschi (b. 1946)	23 May 2016	4 October 2020	Ind (Note: Close to the Democratic Party (PD).)	SVP • PD • VGV and leftist lists	2016 (special)
10	Renzo Caramaschi (b. 1946)	4 October 2020 (Note: Election originally scheduled for May 2020 then postponed due to the coronavirus pandemic.)	19 May 2025	Ind	SVP • PD • VGV and leftist lists	2020
11	Claudio Corrarati (b. 1967)	19 May 2025	Incumbent	Ind	FdI • FI • Lega	2025

== See also ==
- Timeline of Bolzano

== Bibliography ==
- Hannes Obermair (2008). Bozen Süd—Bolzano Nord. Schriftlichkeit und urkundliche Überlieferung der Stadt Bozen bis 1500—Scritturalità e documentazione archivistica della città di Bolzano fino al 1500. Vol. 2. Bolzano: Città di Bolzano. ISBN 978-88-901870-1-8.
