= Alessandro Della Rovere =

Italian politician and military personnel

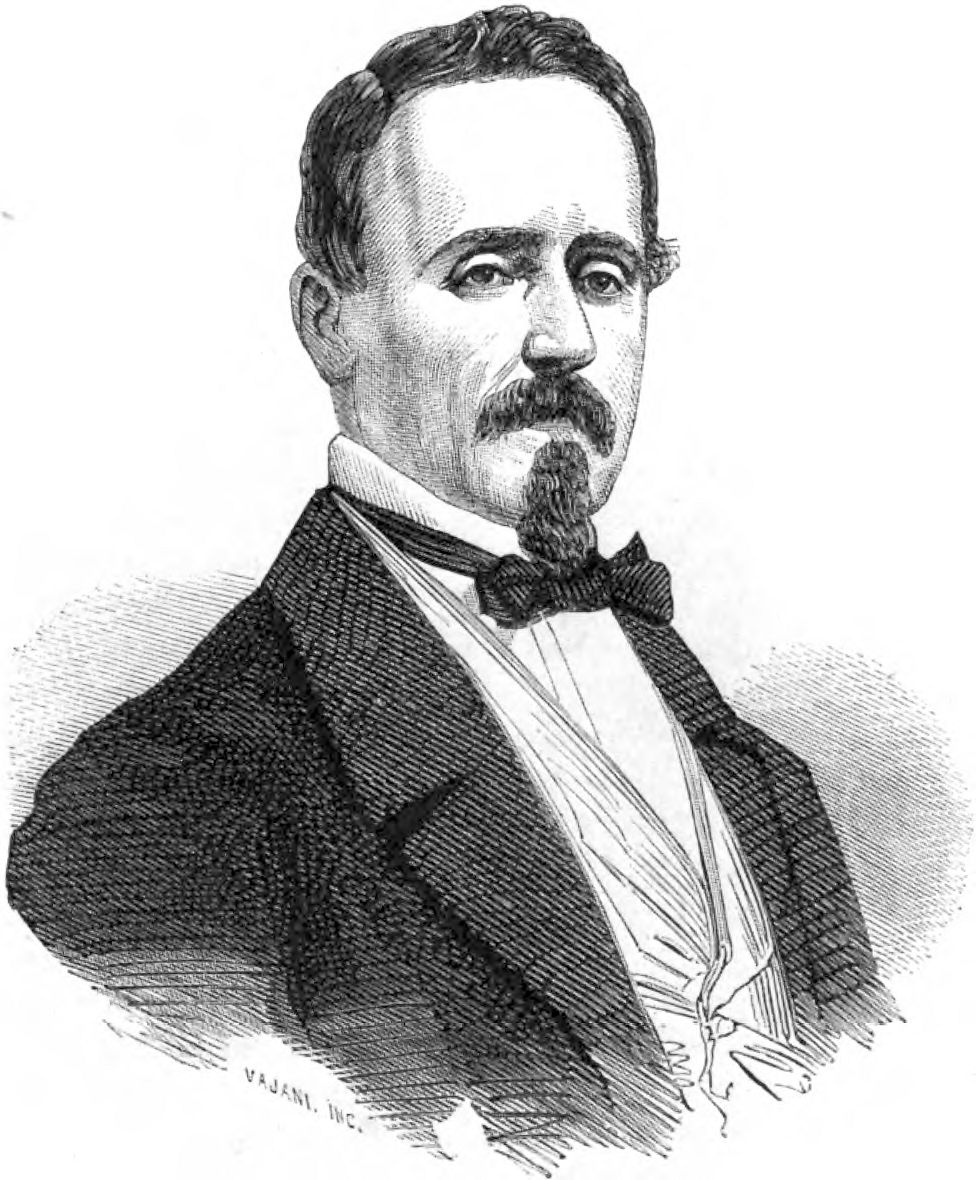

Minister of War
- In office 5 September 1861 – 3 March 1862
- Monarch: Victor Emmanuel II
- Prime Minister: Bettino Ricasoli
- Preceded by: Bettino Ricasoli
- Succeeded by: Agostino Petitti Bagliani di Roreto
- In office 8 December 1862 – 24 March 1863
- Prime Minister: Luigi Carlo Farini
- Succeeded by: Agostino Petitti Bagliani di Roreto
- In office 24 March 1863 – 28 September 1864
- Prime Minister: Marco Minghetti
- Succeeded by: Agostino Petitti Bagliani di Roreto

Senator of the Kingdom of Italy
- In office 29 November 1861 – 17 November 1964

Alessandro Filippo Della Rovere (Casale Monferrato, 26 October 1815 – Turin, 17 November 1864) was a politician, general and senator of the Kingdom of Italy.

== Biography ==
A career officer, he took part in the First Italian War of Independence, the Crimean War and the Second Italian War of Independence. Appointed Lieutenant General of the Royal Sardinian Army in 1859, he was General Intendant of the Sardinian Army in 1860, and with the rank of Major General in the Royal Army. In April 1861 he was appointed Lieutenant General of the King in the Sicilian provinces, until September of the same year, when he was appointed Minister of War.

As such he was one of the first Ministers of the newly formed Kingdom of Italy, holding the Ministry of War in three governments: Ricasoli I, Farini and Minghetti I (1861–1864). He died two months after leaving the ministry.

In November 1861 he was appointed to the Senate king Victor Emmanuel II.

== Honours ==
=== Italian honours ===
Cavaliere di Gran Croce decorato di Gran Cordone dell'Ordine dei Santi Maurizio e Lazzaro – ribbon for ordinary uniform

Knight Grand Cross of the Order of Saints Maurice and Lazarus

Grande ufficiale dell'Ordine militare di Savoia – ribbon for ordinary uniform

Grand Officer of the Military Order of Savoy

Cavaliere dell'Ordine militare di Savoia – ribbon for ordinary uniform

Knight of the Military Order of Savoy

Silver Medal of Military Valor – ribbon for ordinary uniform

Silver Medal of Military Valor

Medaglia commemorativa dell'Unità d'Italia – ribbon for ordinary uniform

Commemorative Medal of the Unity of Italy

Medaglia commemorativa delle campagne delle Guerre d'Indipendenza – ribbon for ordinary uniform

Commemorative Medal of the Unity of Italy

=== Foreign honours ===
Commendatore dell'ordine della Legion d'onore (Francia) – ribbon for ordinary uniform

Commander of the Legion of Honour

Compagno dell'Ordine del Bagno (Regno Unito) – ribbon for ordinary uniform

Companion of the Order of the Bath

Medaglia inglese della Guerra di Crimea – ribbon for ordinary uniform

Crimea Medal

Medaille Commémorative de la Campagne d'Italie de 1859 – ribbon for ordinary uniform

Commemorative medal of the 1859 Italian Campaign
