= Battle of Novara (1821) =

Civil conflict between Sardinia and Piedmont

Date	8 April 1821
Location	Novara, Italy 45°25′53″N 8°42′58″E
Result	Sardinian victory

Belligerents
Piedmontese rebels	Sardinia; Austria

Commanders and leaders
Unknown	(Kingdom of Sardinia) Charles Felix

Strength
5,000	7,000 Sardinians; 2,000 Austrians

The Battle of Novara took place between Piedmontese liberal rebels and the royalist Sardinians with support from the Austrian Empire. The battle ended in a victory for the Sardinians, and the rebellion soon ended.
