= Bolzano Cathedral =

Church building in Bolzano, Italy

Coordinates: 46.497539°N 11.353936°E

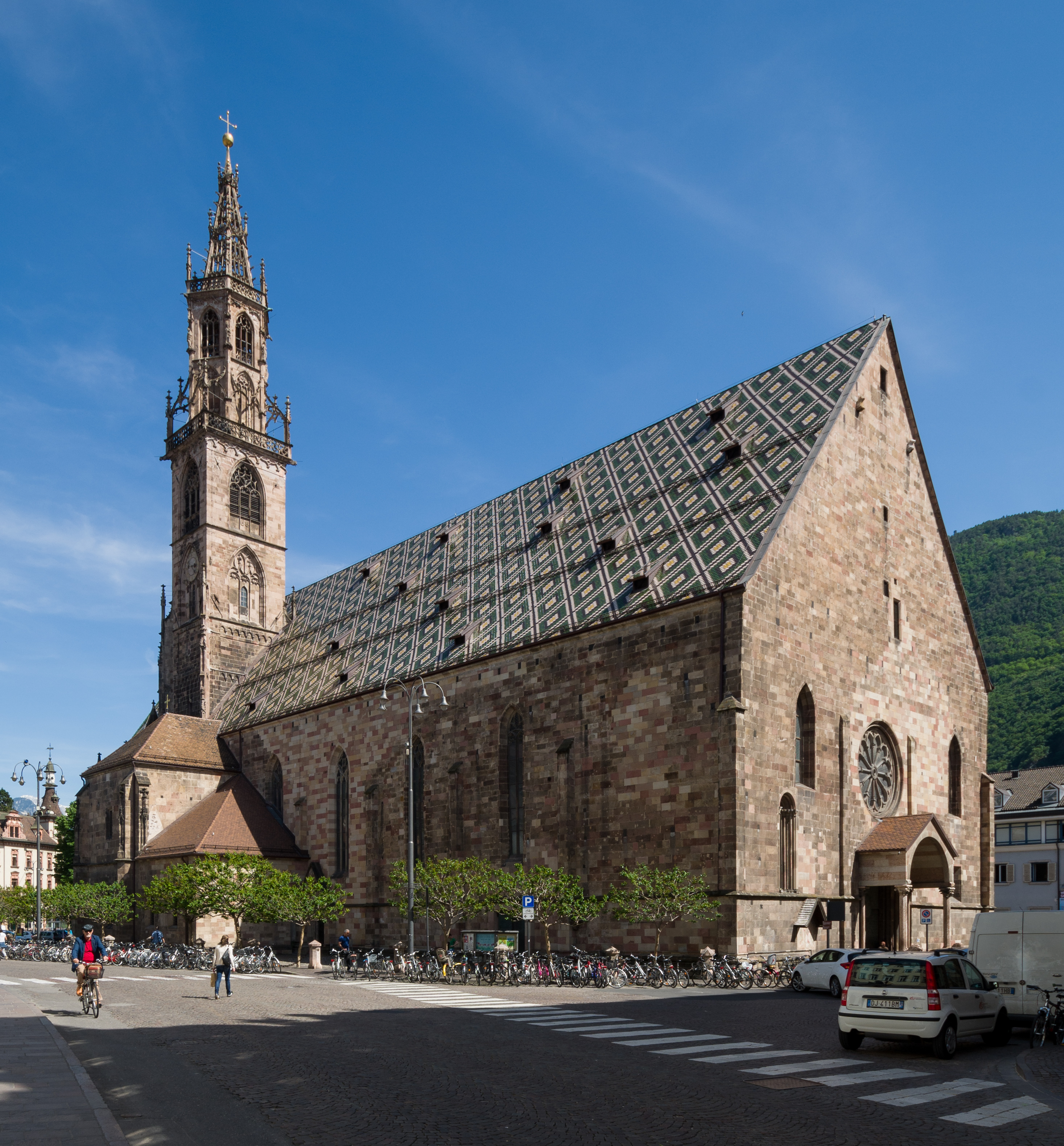
Exterior view from Northwest

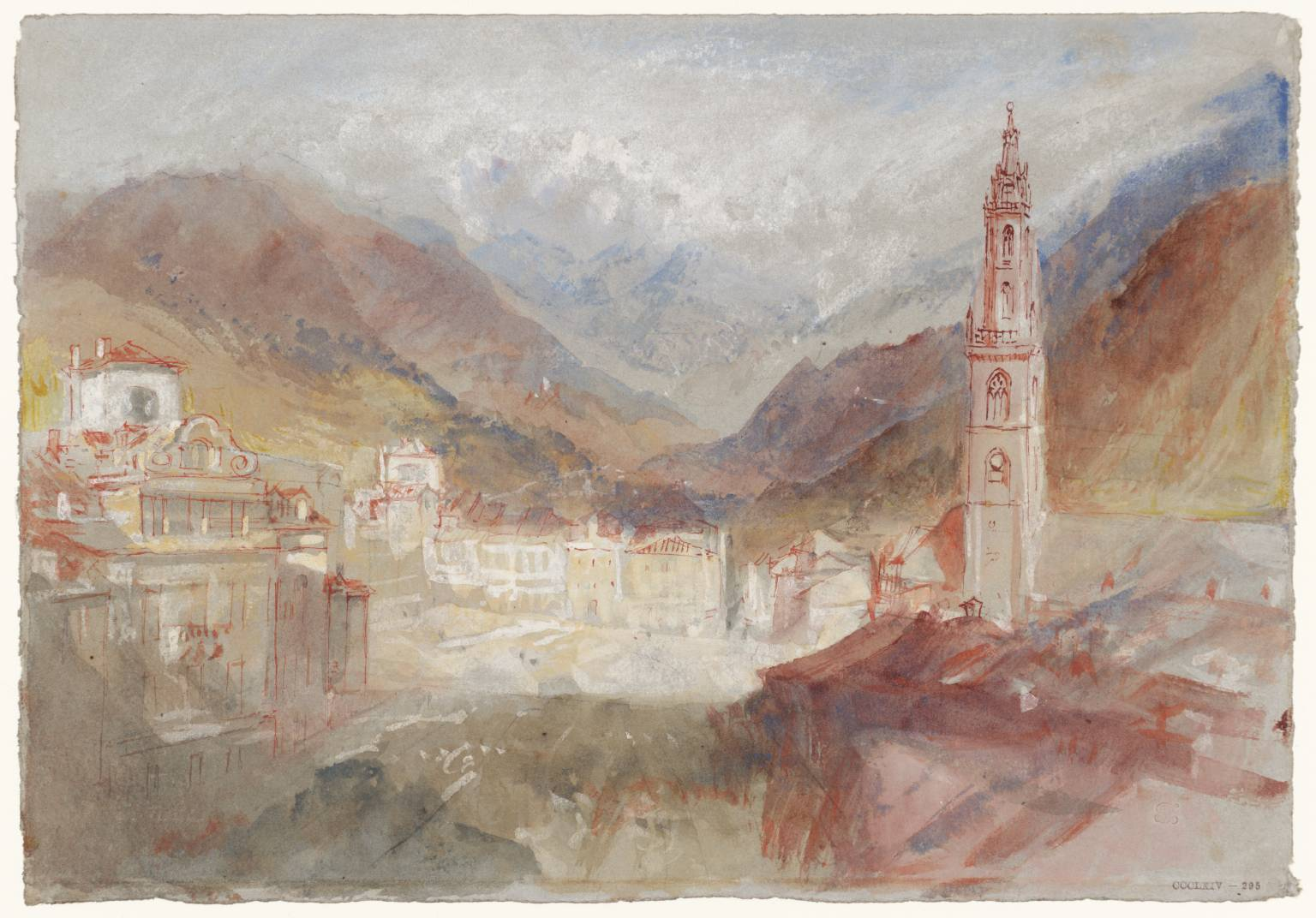
William Turner, Bozen and the Dolomites (1840), Watercolor in Tate Gallery with Bolzano Cathedral in foreground

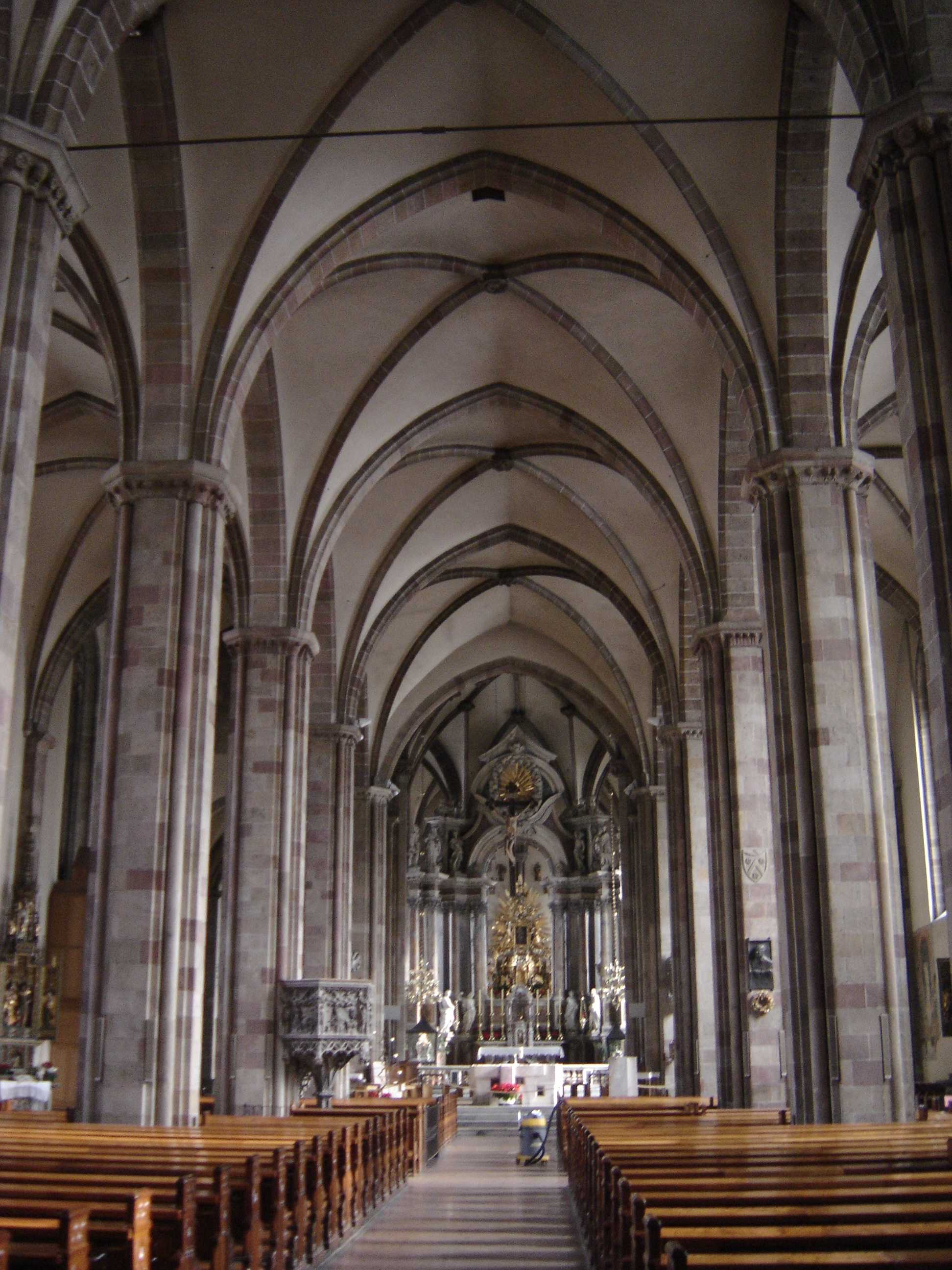
Interior view

Bolzano Cathedral (Italian: Duomo di Bolzano, German: Bozner Dom), or the Cathedral of the Assumption of Mary (Italian: Cattedrale di Santa Maria Assunta, German: Dom Maria Himmelfahrt) is the parish church of Bolzano, capital of South Tyrol, and cathedral of the Diocese of Bozen-Brixen. While the Bishop has resided in Bozen since 1964, the cathedral and the cathedral chapter remain in Brixen. Bolzano Cathedral is therefore with Brixen Cathedral co-cathedral of the diocese.

== History ==
According to the 14th-century Bozner Chronicle (Bozner Chronik), the first parish church of Bozen was consecrated in 1180 and built in Romanesque style. According to legend, a Bozner coachman found a miraculous shrine of Mary, Mother of God at the later location of the church. This figure, known as Liebe Frau vom Moos (German Our Lady of the Bog), is said to have been in the marshland of the Eisack, whose riverbed was then much closer to the cathedral than it is today. Dating from the 12th century, the statue is housed in the baroque Chapel of Grace behind the high altar of the church. The mediaeval church was built on the remains of an early Christian basilica from the 6th century.

The first priest of Bozen, Rudolf, is mentioned in 1195 on the occasion of a land exchange between the Upper Bavarian imperial abbey at Tegernsee and the Prince-Bishopric of Trent. Due to sparse sources from this time, it is unknown when the church was elevated to a parish church. In 1259, Count Meinhard II acquired the lands of the parish and from this time, the parish church functioned as cella memoriae for the Tyrolean regents of the House of Gorizia and after 1363 for the Habsburgs. This anniversary of the bequeathment of the Tyrolean assets to the Habsburgs (der jarttæg … der herschafft von Ósterreich) was confirmed by a settlement in 1435, in which the entire German part of the Prince-Bishopric of Trent committed to the octave of Bolzano Cathedral .

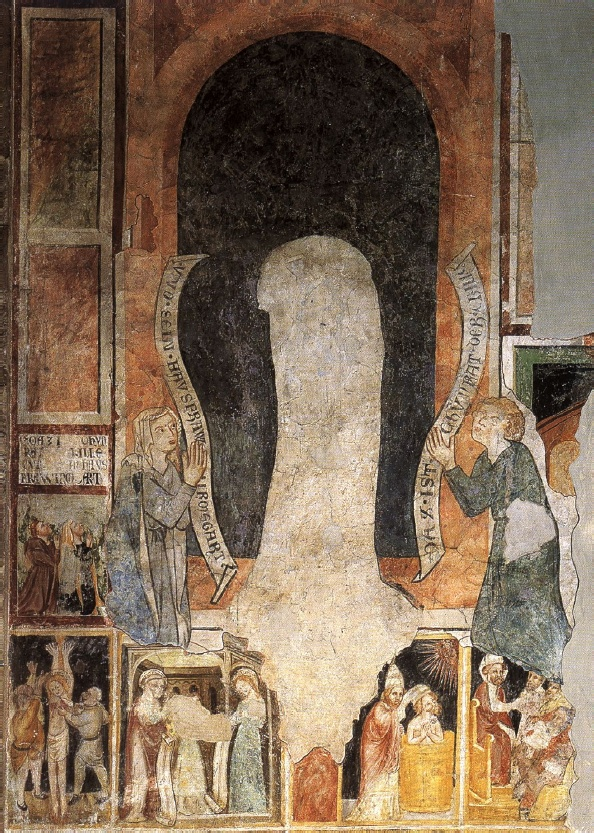
The donor portrait of the Bozner husband and wife Konrad and Irmgard Chrille (Krille) in the right side aisle with the painted banners, early 14th century

Around 1300, a reconstruction of the church was begun in late Gothic style to meet the increased demands of the city of Bozen, which had grown intensely both in terms of population and territory. The new church was completed in 1519 with the construction of the tower in late Gothic style, designed by the Augsburg master mason Burkhard Engelberg and finished by Hans Lutz of Schussenried. From the same period is the late Gothic pulpit of sandstone with the reliefs of the four Church Fathers and the four Evangelist portraits. The pulpit was partially destroyed by Allied bombardments of 1943–1944 and rebuilt in 1949.

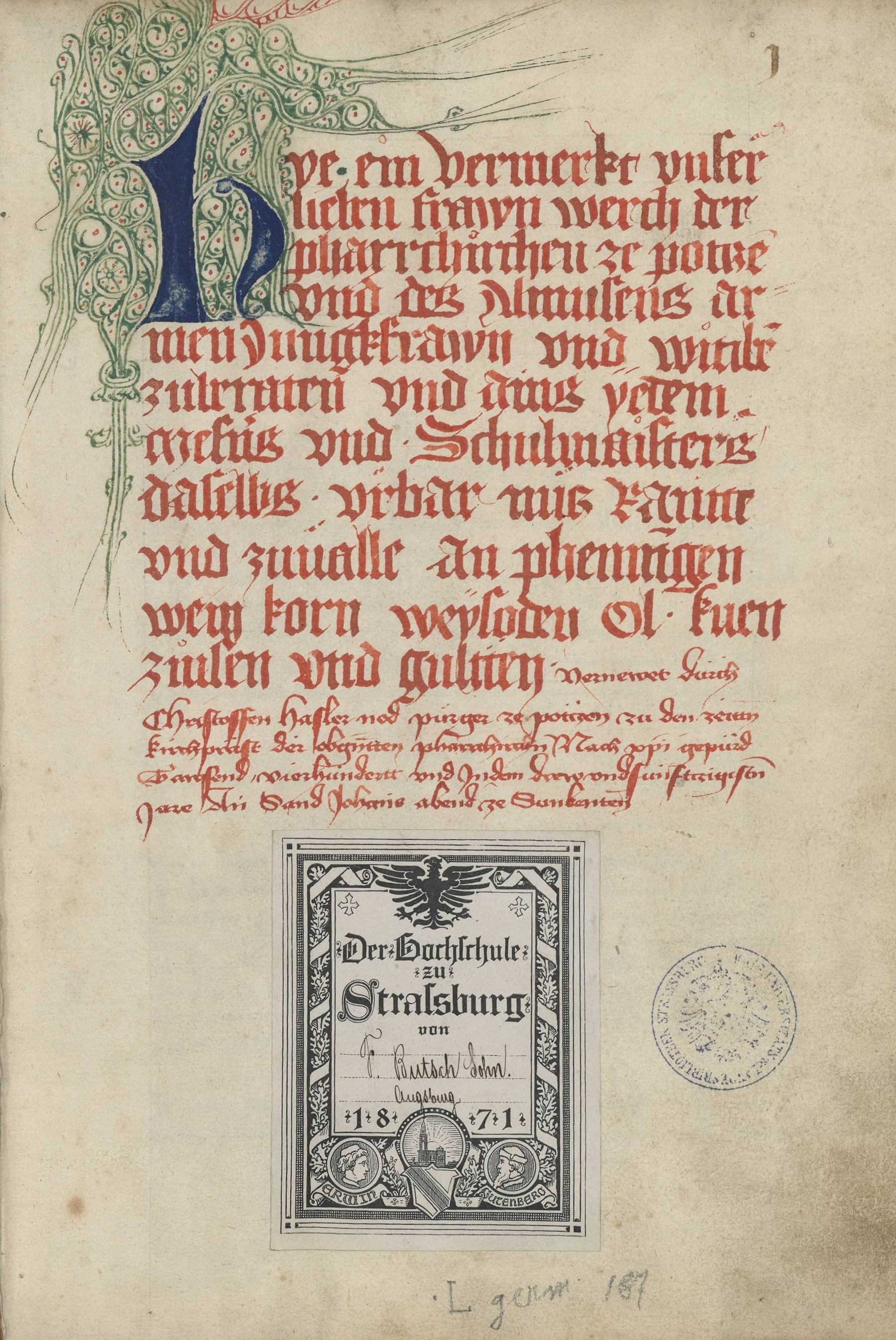
Cover page of the urbarium of the parish church from 1453–1460 (Early New High German)

An urbarium of the parish church exists from the middle 15th century (1453–1460) in which the then church caretaker Christof Hasler the Elder registered the landed property and legal titles of the parish church. The manuscript is housed in the Bibliothèque nationale et universitaire de Strasbourg, where it ended up in 1871.

The parish church, the St. Nicholas Church (immediately south of the parish church) and the rectory (provostry) were severely hit in the allied air raids 1943–44, which targeted the Operational Zone of the Alpine Foothills. While only the foundations exist today from the Nicholas Church, the parish church was restored. Many frescoes, stained-glass windows and the altarpiece were lost. During the reconstruction work, remains from the early Christian church were found.

Although the church tower survived the allied bombings without damage, it had to be restored beginning in the mid-1970s. The restoration work cost more than 1.03 million euros and was completed in 1986.

In December 2008, some of the colorful glazed roof tiles detached. In Spring 2009, a group to finance the roof renovation (approximately 850,000 euros) was established. The work was completed in 2010. The Province of South Tyrol and the Stiftung Südtiroler Sparkasse supported the renovation.

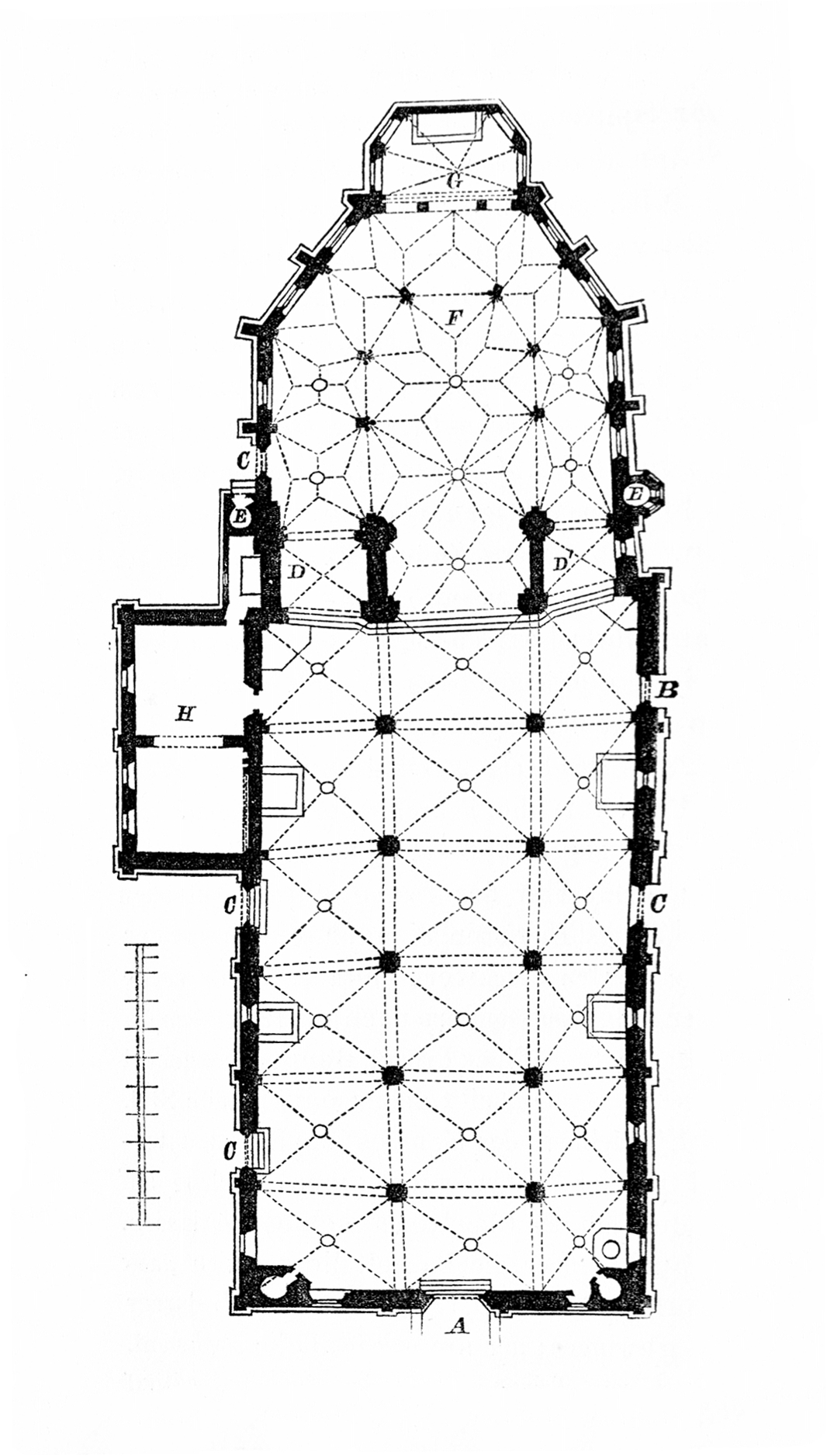
Floorplan of Maria Himmelfahrt

=== Inscriptions ===
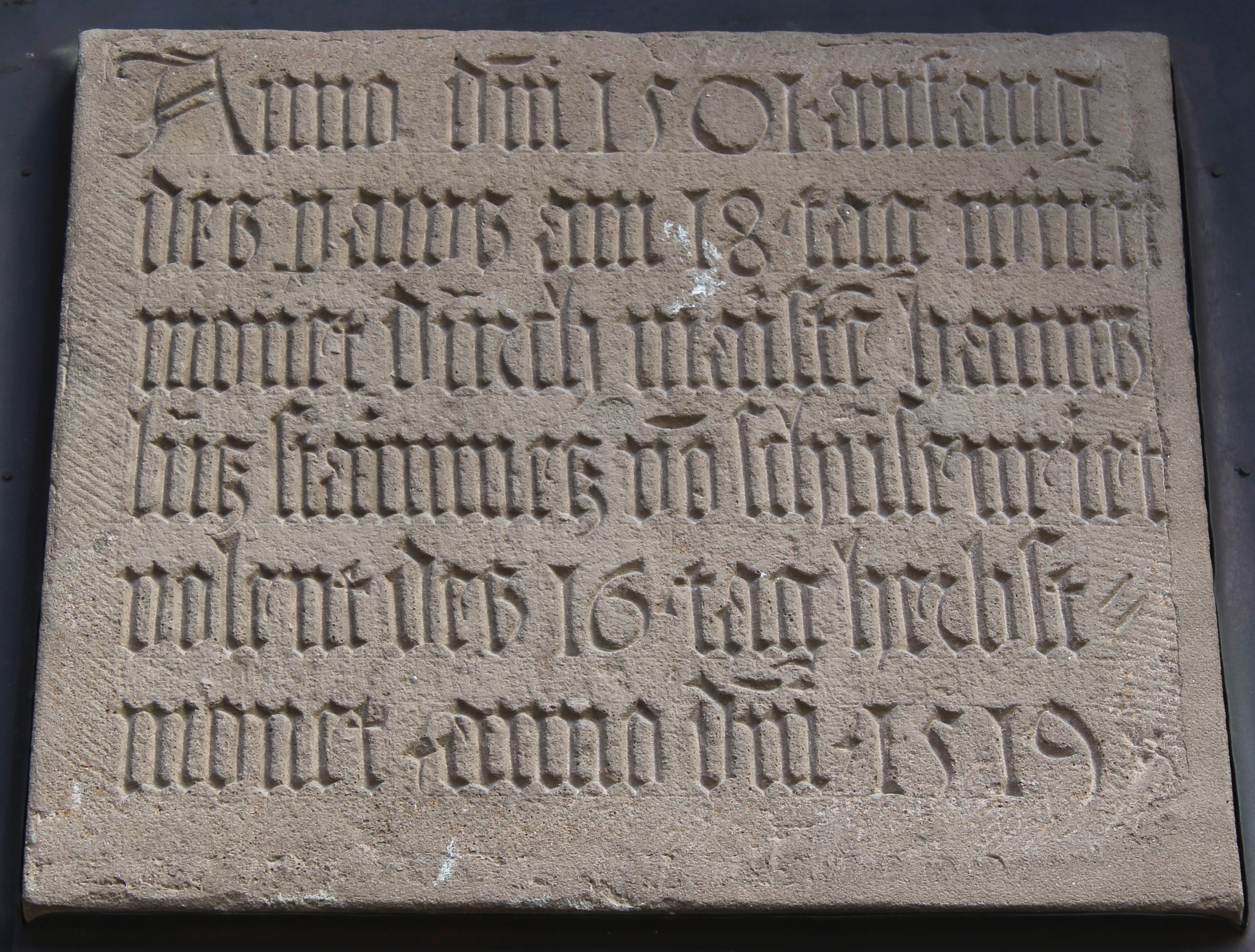
Inscription of the early 16th century

On the south side of the parish church, there is an exact copy of the early New High German building inscription in local sandstone. The original is located in the openwork spire of the church. The inscription in late Gothic minuscule reads:

Anno d[omi]ni 1501 anfang / des paws am 18 tag winte[r] / monet durch maiste[r] hanns / lutz stainmetz vo[n] schusenriet / volent des 16 tag herbst / monet anno d[omi]ni 1519.

Translation: In the year of the Lord 1501 on the 18th day of the winter month, construction was begun by master Hans Lutz, stonemason from Schussenried, completed on the 16th day of the autumn month in the year of the Lord 1519. The tower and the tower inscription can be found in a similar form on two portraits of master Hans Lutz of Schussenried in the Bozen City Museum.

=== Historical cemetery ===
The old Bozner cemetery originally extended around the parish church at its northern, eastern and southern part. This cemetery was first mentioned by documents in 1184, further expanded in 1547, finished in 1789 by Emperor Joseph II and used until 1826. In November 1826, a new neoclassical cemetery was inaugurated with arcades and frescoes in Nazarene style of Giuseppe Craffonara. This cemetery was located south of the parish church and provostry and was directly administered by the parish, serving its purpose until 1930–1932. Thereafter, funerals took place at the new Oberau Cemetery in St. Jakob, just south of Bozen. As a result, the old cemetery grounds deteriorated and there were also heavily damaged in the air raids 1943–44. 1951–52, the remaining arcades were demolished and in 1973 the last remnants were removed when the neo-Gothic cemetery chapel was demolished. The grounds were overbuilt in 1991–93 with the new Pastoral Center and Curia of Bozen-Brixen accord to plans of Architect Othmar Barth.

== Facilities ==
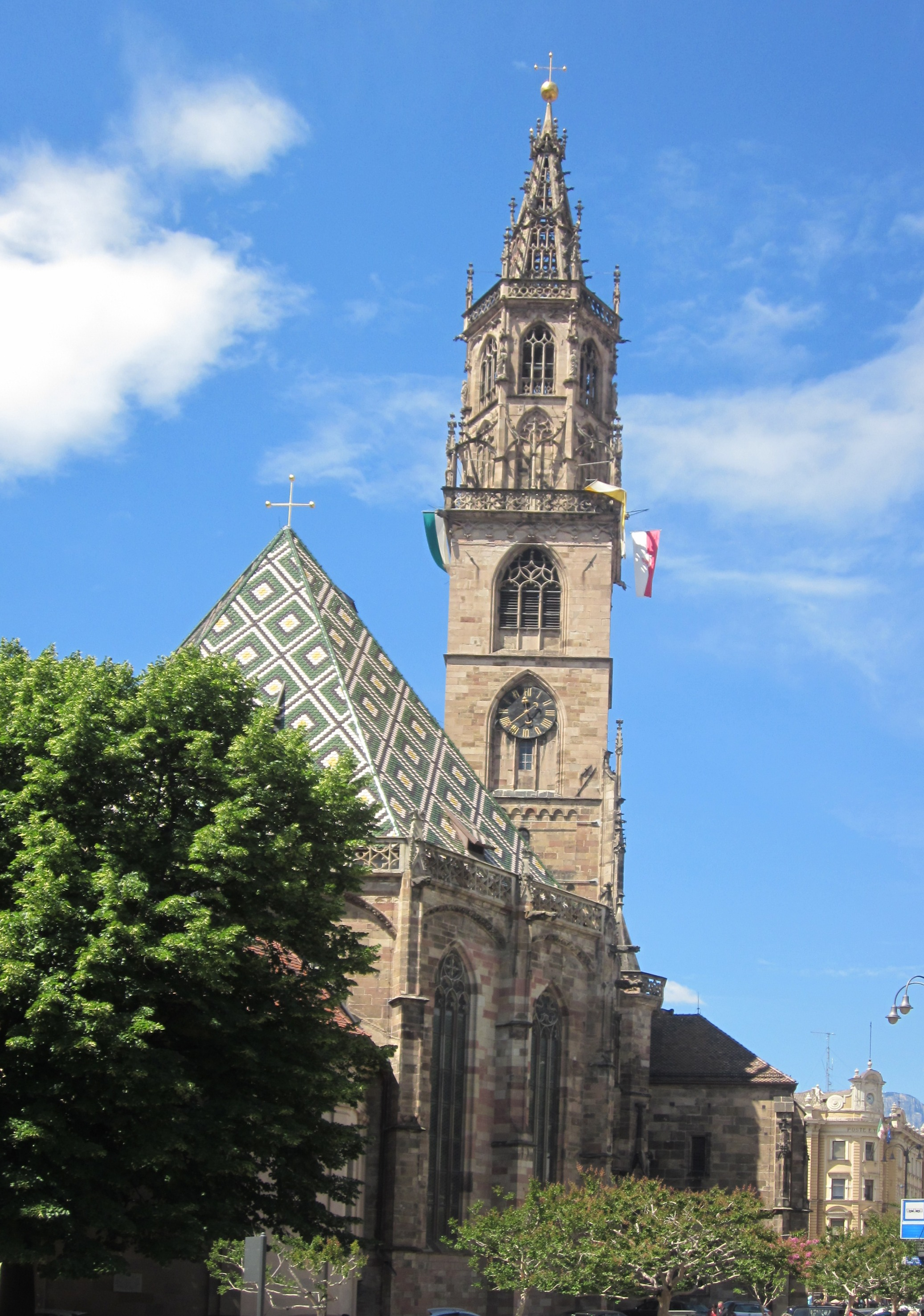
View from the east

The parish church has received numerous donations from the citizens of the city and, therefore, belongs to the churches of the Alps with the most pews. In addition to the bell tower and the pulpit, there are two organs in the parish church, a pietà from the time of International Gothic as well as various late Gothic frescoes and neo-Gothic side altars that survived the destruction in World War II. The Gothic nave was built in 1716 by the Veronese architect Raghieri and contrasts with the monumental Baroque high altar with its numerous columns and figures of saints.

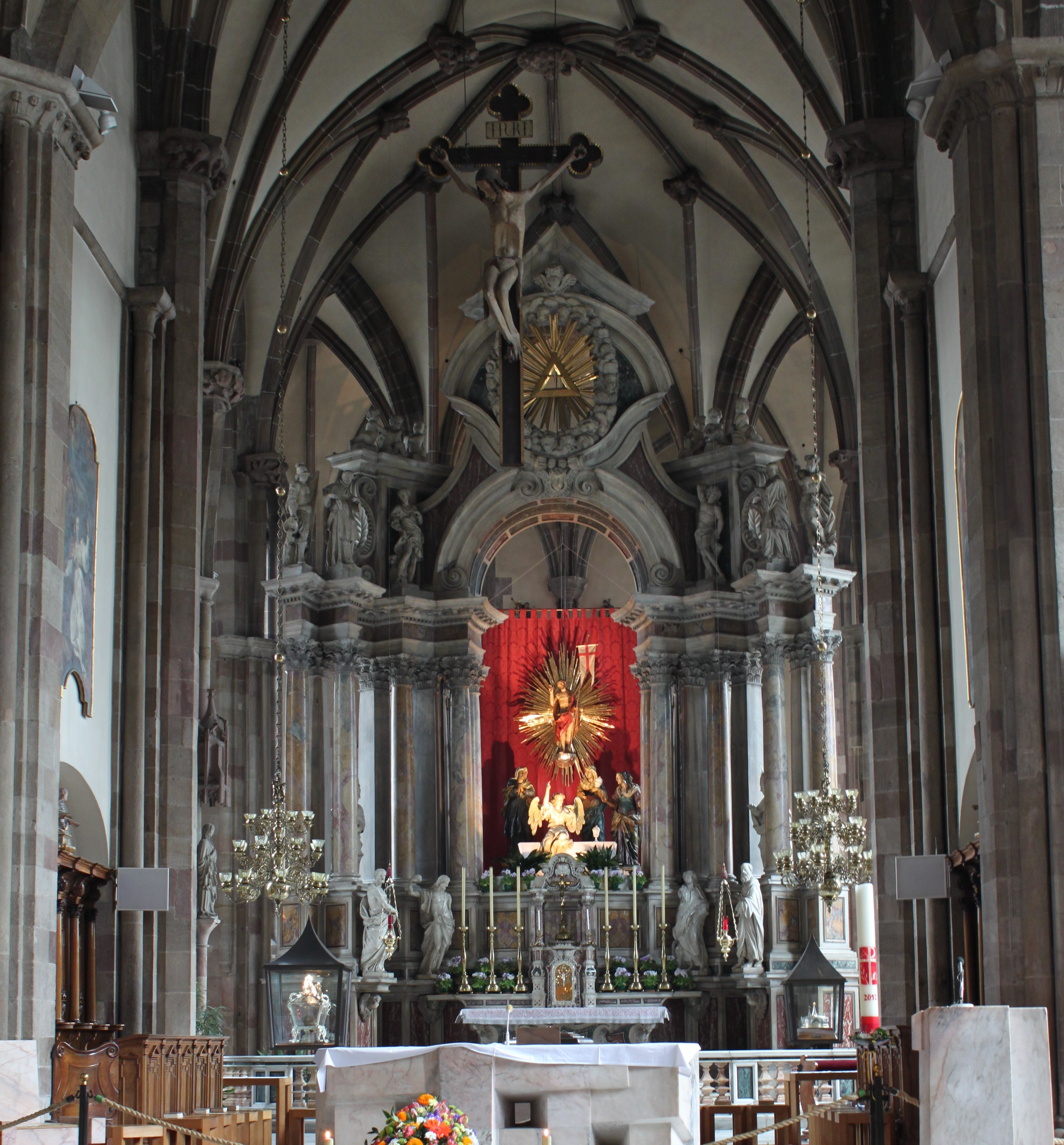
Presbytery and high altar

The Cathedral of Bozen houses the Sacred Heart figure by Johann Josef Karl Henrici that has been revered since 1795 and in 1796 it motivated the defense of Tyrol against the Napoleonic forces. Today, a copy is carried through the city during the annual procession of the Sacred Heart. In addition to several mediaeval relics, the church houses those of the Bozner saints Henry of Bozen and Johann Nepomuk von Tschiderer zu Gleifheim, the latter of which was baptized in the parish church.

The presbytery was enlarged in the 1970s to better meet the needs as a diocese church. In addition, congregation altar was constructed of several pink marble blocks by the sculptor Michael Höllrigl of Lana in 1977. The still heavily criticized renovation work was completed in 1992 with the construction of priest's seats Ambon and Cathedra, matching the altar. On the occasion of the dedication of the altar in 1992, a relic of Saint Vigilius of Trent was set in the altar.

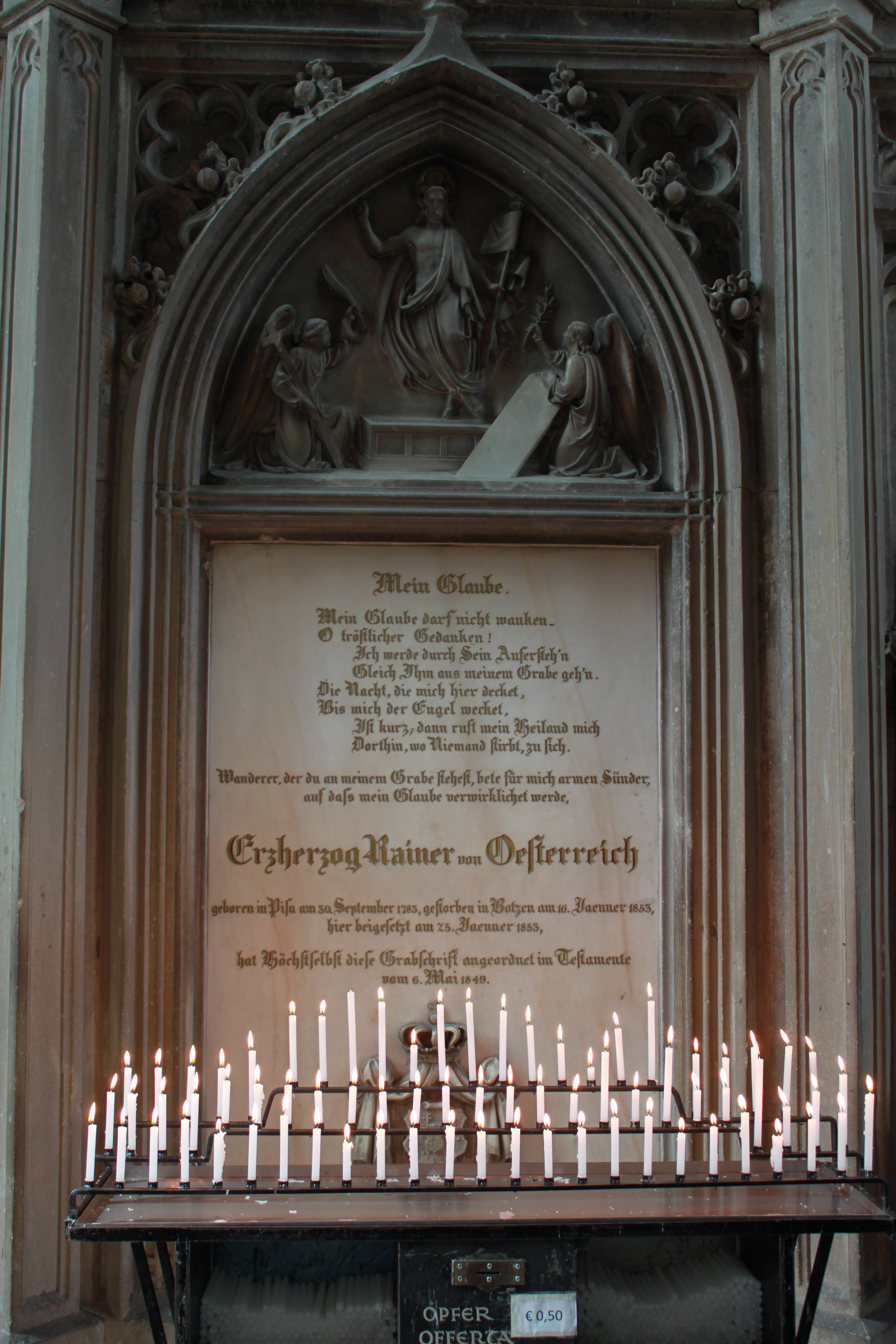
Grave of Archduke Rainer Joseph of Austria, constructed by Sebastian Altmann (1864)

Not far from the altar is the gravestone of Wilhelms III of Henneberg-Schleusingen. He died in 1480 in Salurn on his way back from Rome. His body was buried here in 1482, before it was transferred to his family plot in Kloster Veßra. The Bozner Epitaph was made in 1490 by the sculptor Erasmus Forster in Gardolo near Trent and placed in the church 1495–96. On the back of the high altar is the gravestone of Archduke Rainer Joseph of Austria, the former viceroy of Lombardy–Venetia.

=== Organs ===
Both organs come from Metzler Orgelbau in Dietikon, Switzerland. The main organ, also referred to as the St. Gregorius Organ, was built in 1964. The slider chest instrument has 41 registers on three manuals and pedals. The tracker actions are mechanical.

I Rückpositiv C–f^{3}
1.	Gedackt	8′
2.	Quintatön (ab c^{0})	8′
3.	Prinzipal	4′
4.	Rohrflöte	4′
5.	Sesquialtera II	2 2/3′
6.	Waldflöte	2′
7.	Larigot	1 1/3′
8.	Scharf	1′
9.	Krummhorn	8′

II Hauptwerk C–f^{3}
10.	Pommer	16′
11.	Prinzipal	8′
12.	Voce umana (ab a^{0})	8′
13.	Rohrflöte	8′
14.	Spitzgambe	8′
15.	Octave	4′
16.	Nachthorn	4′
17.	Quinte	2 2/3′
18.	Octave	2′
19.	Cornet (ab g^{0})	8′
20.	Mixtur	1 3/5′
21.	Ripieno VI
22.	Trompete	16′
23.	Trompete	8′

II Schwell-Brustwerk C–g^{3}
24.	Holzgedackt	8′
25.	Spitzgedackt	4′
26.	Prinzipal	2′
27.	Tertian II	1 3/5′
28.	Sifflflöte	1′
29.	Zimbel	1/2′
30.	Regal	16′
31.	Vox humana	8′
	Tremulant

Pedal C–f^{1}
32.	Prinzipal	16′
33.	Subbass	16′
34.	Octav	8′
35.	Pommer	8′
36.	Oktav	4′
37.	Nachthorn	2′
38.	Mixtur	2 2/3′
39.	Posaune	16′
40.	Trompete	8′
41.	Clarion	4′

Couplers: III-II, I-II, I-P, II-P (pedals)

The choir organ, also called the marine organ, was built in 1997 and is located in left side aisle at the height of the congregation altar. The instrument has 17 registers on two manuals and one pedal keyboard. The tracker actions are mechanical.

I Hauptwerk C–f^{3}
1.	Prinzipal	8′
2.	Rohrflöte	8′
3.	Octave	4′
4.	Spitzflöte	4′
5.	Quinte	2 2/3′
6.	Superoctave	2′
7.	Terz	1 3/5′
8.	Mixtur	1/1′

II Positiv C–f^{3}
9.	Gedackt	8′
10.	Rohrflöte	4′
11.	Nasard	2 2/3′
12.	Doublette	2′
13.	Terz	1 3/5′
14.	Vox humana	8′
	Tremulant

Pedal C–f^{1}
15.	Subbass	16′
16.	Octavbass	8′
17.	Posaune	8′

Couplers: II-I, I-P, II-P (pedals)

=== Carillon ===
In the upper hexagon of the parish tower hangs a carillon with 25 bells, cast by Grassmayr Bell Foundry of Innsbruck, Austria. It was installed in 2010 and is played Saturdays and Sundays at 11:00 a.m. after the chiming of the hour.

=== Cathedral treasury and library ===
A large part of cathedral treasure, which consists of numerous goblets, monstrances and vestments, is housed in the Cathedral Treasury Bozen since its construction in 2007 in the neighboring provostry. The once significant manuscript collection has been lost, which, according to inventories of the late 15th century, comprised nearly 40 liturgical manuscripts and texts of the Holy Scriptures. The extensive book inventory with more than 10,000 works of 15th to 19th century however has been preserved. Numerous early prints of the collection go back to the Bavarian humanist Erasmus Fend (also called Fendt or Vendius). The parish church of Bozen was also an important center for cultivation of music in the 15th century.

== Sources ==
- Alois Spornberger (1894). Geschichte der Pfarrkirche von Bozen. Mit einem kunstgeschichtlichen und archivalischen Anhange. Bozen: Auer.
- Leo Santifaller (1924). Die Pfarrkirche von Bozen. Bozen: Tyrolia-Verlag.
- Anton Maurer, Josef Ringler (1945). Baugeschichte der Bozner Pfarrkirche. Die Überreste mittelalterlicher Wandmalereien in der Bozner Pfarrkirche. (Beihefte des „Bozner Jahrbuchs für Geschichte, Kultur und Kunst“, Bd. 8). Bozen: Athesia.
- Hannes Obermair (1995). Kirche und Stadtentstehung. Die Pfarrkirche Bozen im Hochmittelalter (11.–13. Jahrhundert). In Die Dompfarre Bozen im Wandel der Zeiten. Bozen: Athesia, pg. 449–74.
- Hannes Obermair (2005). „Hye ein vermerkt Unser lieben frawn werch ...“: Das Urbar und Rechtsbuch der Marienpfarrkirche Bozen von 1453/60. (= bz.history 2). Bozen-Bolzano: Civic Council.
- Bernhard Mertelseder (2006). Das Kollegiatstift Bozen. In Hannes Obermair et al. (eds). Dom- und Kollegiatstifte in der Region Tirol – Südtirol – Trentino / Collegialità ecclesiastica nella regione trentino-tirolese. (Schlern-Schriften, Bd. 329). Innsbruck: Wagner. ISBN 3-7030-0403-7, pg. 297–316.
- Helmut Stampfer (2013). Dom Maria Himmelfahrt Bozen. 3. Auflage. Regensburg: Schnell & Steiner. ISBN 978-3-7954-6961-0
