= State Archives of Bolzano =

State archival institution in Bolzano, Italy

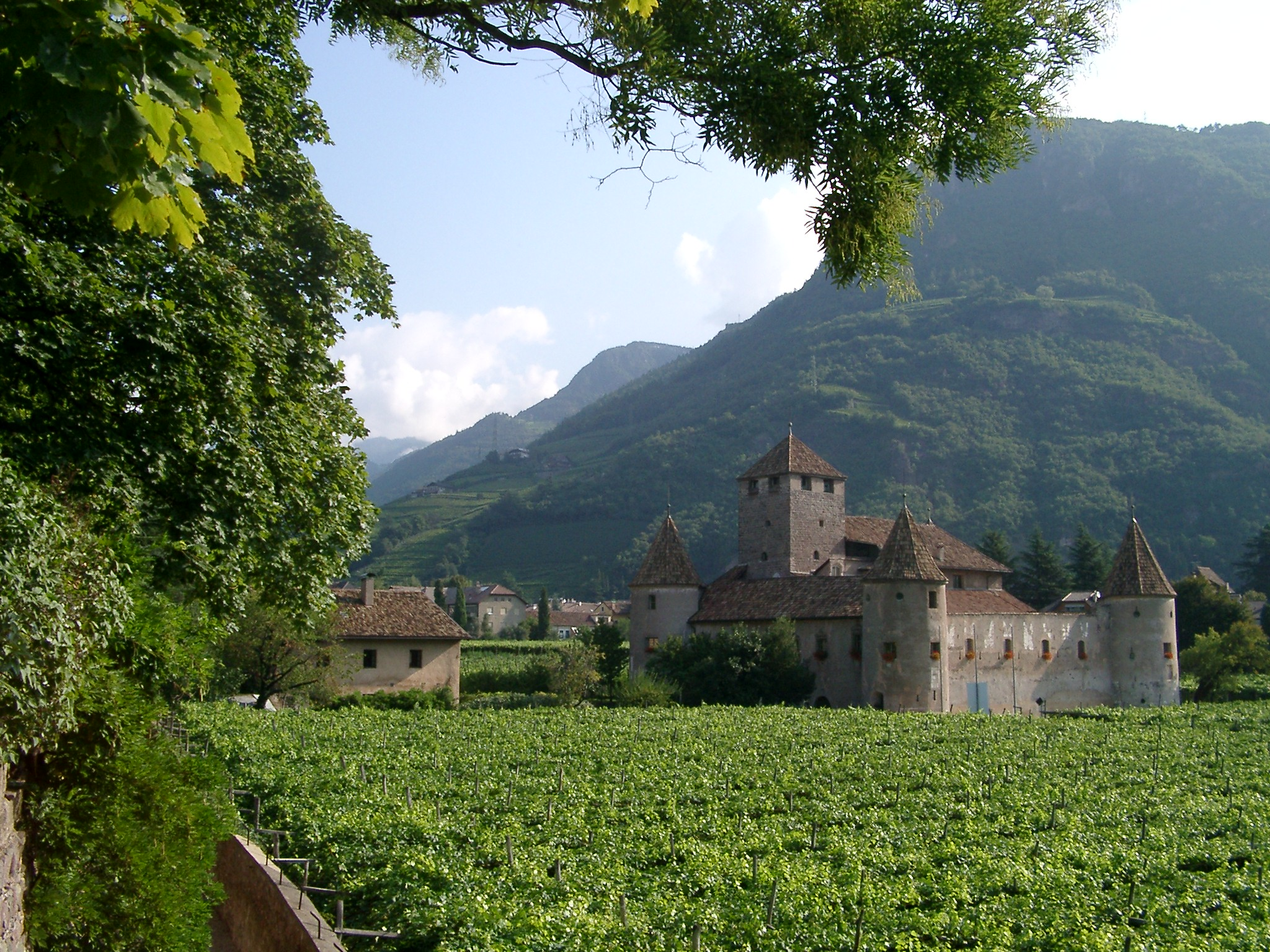
- Interactive map of State Archives of Bolzano
- 46°30′11″N 11°20′35″E
- Location: Bolzano, South Tyrol, Italy
- Type: State archive
- Established: 20 October 1920
- Website: https://archiviodistatobolzano.cultura.gov.it/

The State Archives of Bolzano (Italian: Archivio di Stato di Bolzano; Italian: Staatsarchiv Bozen) is the state archival institution in Bolzano, South Tyrol, Italy. It preserves historical records produced by public offices and institutions in the territory as part of the national archival network administered by the Ministry of Culture.

== History ==
The institution was established on 20 October 1920 as a Section of the newly created State Archives of Trento. It became an independent State Archive on 2 June 1930. Its first director was the medievalist Leo Santifaller, who in 1921 adapted Maretsch Castle as the archive's headquarters but moved on to Berlin's Monumenta Germaniae Historica in 1927. In 1972 the castle was declared structurally unsafe. After several years in temporary accommodation in a former workshop on Viale Druso, the institution moved in 1985 to a new building in the Gries-San Quirino district.

== Sources ==
- "Archivio di Stato di Bolzano" (PDF). Guida generale degli Archivi di Stato italiani. Vol. I. Rome: Ministero per i beni culturali e ambientali. 1981. pp. 663–677.
- "Archivio di Stato di Bolzano". Sistema informativo degli Archivi di Stato (in Italian). Istituto centrale per gli archivi.
