= Santo Angelo Custode, Alcamo =

Church building in Alcamo, Italy

Santo Angelo Custode
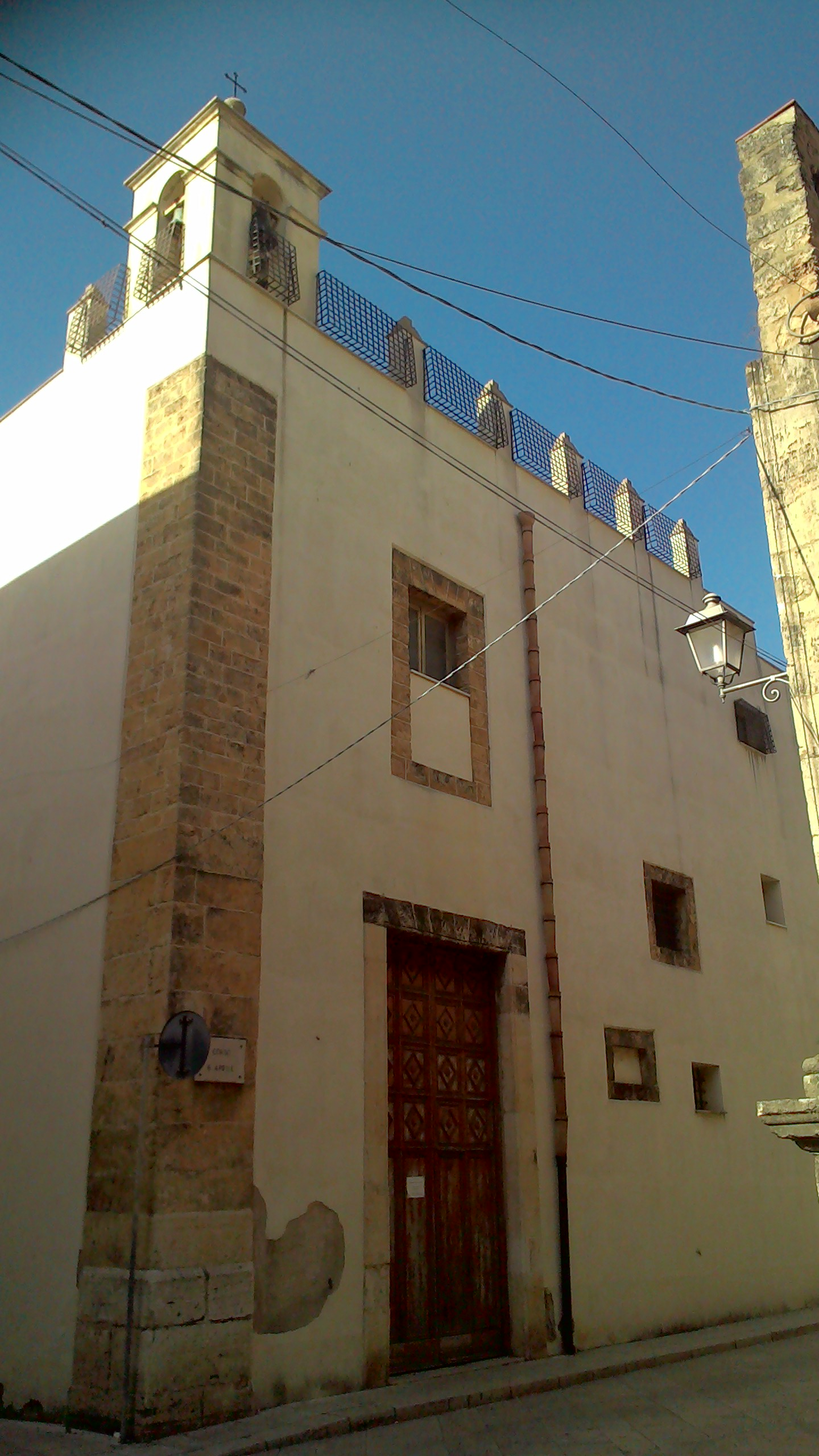
- The façade

Religion
- Affiliation: Benedictine
- Province: Trapani
- Region: Sicily
- Rite: Catholic
- Patron: saint Guardian Angel

Location
- Location: Alcamo, province of Trapani, Italy
- Municipality: Alcamo
- State: Italy
- Interactive map of Santo Angelo Custode
- Territory: Alcamo
- Coordinates: 37°58′52″N 12°58′00″E

Architecture
- Architect: Giovan Biagio Amico
- Type: baroque
- Founder: Francesco Lazio
- Groundbreaking: 1659

Santo Angelo Custode ("Holy Guardian Angel", or chiesa delle Riparate, "Sheltered Women", from the name of the women's detention home once inside the nunnery) is a Catholic church located in Alcamo in the province of Trapani, Sicily, southern Italy.

== Description ==
The church has a single nave. It was built in 1659 in the Baroque style, with the adjoining "Convent boarding school for sheltered women" built in 1684. It was enlarged and embellished in the 18th century by the architect Giovanni Biagio Amico, and restored again in the 19th century. The structure of the building has been improved in recent years in order to render it more suitable for modern requirements.

=== History ===
On 24 April 1647, the four municipal administrators founded a House for the Repented or Sheltered Women ("converted sinners"), in order to avoid sins and the devil's temptations. This institution was called "House of the Sisters of Penance" and they had to live thanks to people's alms and following the rules of the bishop of Mazara del Vallo; they were forced to undergo penance practices and severe body corporal punishments.

In 1659 Francesco Lazio, a priest, left his patrimony to a "Church of the Saint Guardian Angel", which was to be built with the adjoining House of the Sisters of Penance: these women had to follow the Rule of Santa Francesca Romana.

In 1774 there were ten women living there, coming from the provinces of Trapani, Palermo and Messina. This number later grew to fifteen. Further to the new dispositions about religious institutions, since 1820, the building received only "religious women" belonging to the Benedictine Order, and orphans. As it was a moral institution in 1880, its goods were not confiscated by the State property.

== Works ==
The works of art in the church include:

- Jesus’ apparition to Mary Magdalen, (under the choir on the right), by an unknown author
- Saint Margaret of Cortona (under the choir on the left), by an unknown author
- the Guardian Angel, canvas by Domenico La Bruna (1738).
- santa Francesca Romana, canvas by Domenico La Bruna (1738).
- Jesus and the Samaritan (in the apse on the left), by an unknown author
- Jesus and the Adulteress (in the apse on the right), by an unknown author
- the Holy Heart of Jesus (1789), by an unknown author
- Madonna of Libera, painted by G. Mistretta, in 2nd half of the 19th century
- An 18th century wooden crown, a Crucifix and stuccoes on the high altar
- Statue of saint Benedict, (1980) made by the Santifaller school
- Statue of Saint Scolastica, (1980) made by the Santifaller school.
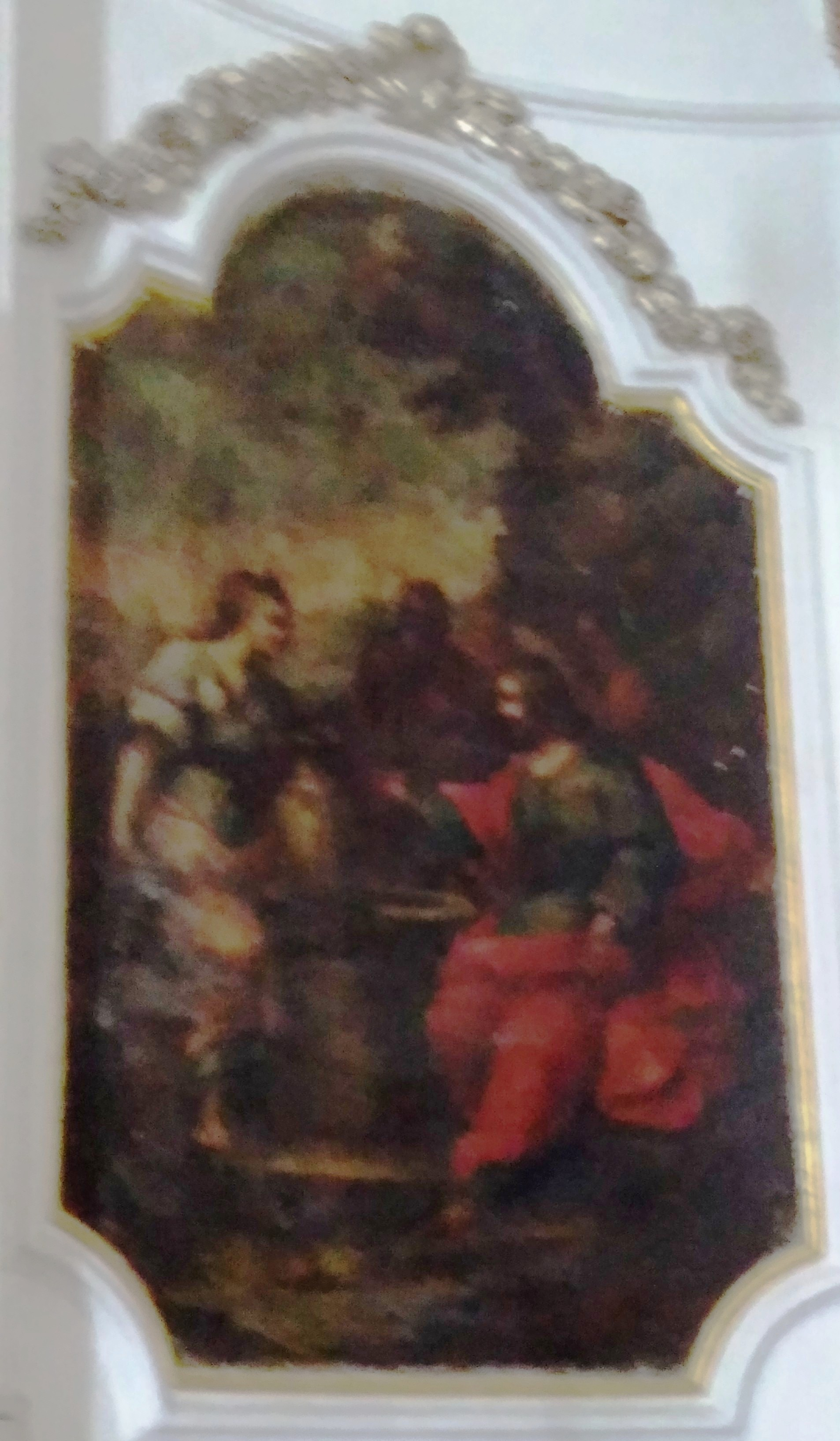
Jesus and the Samaritan woman

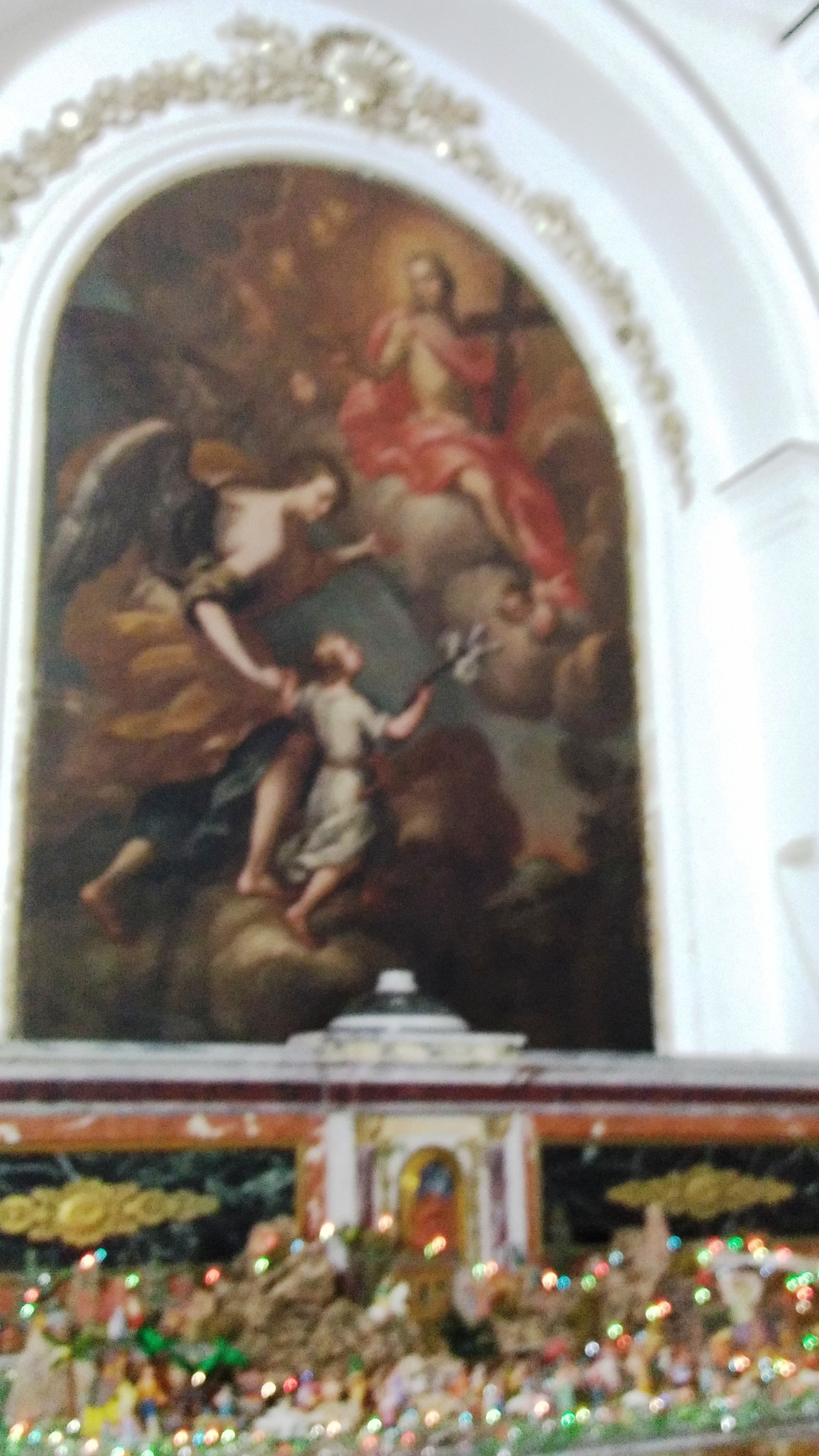
The Guardian Angel

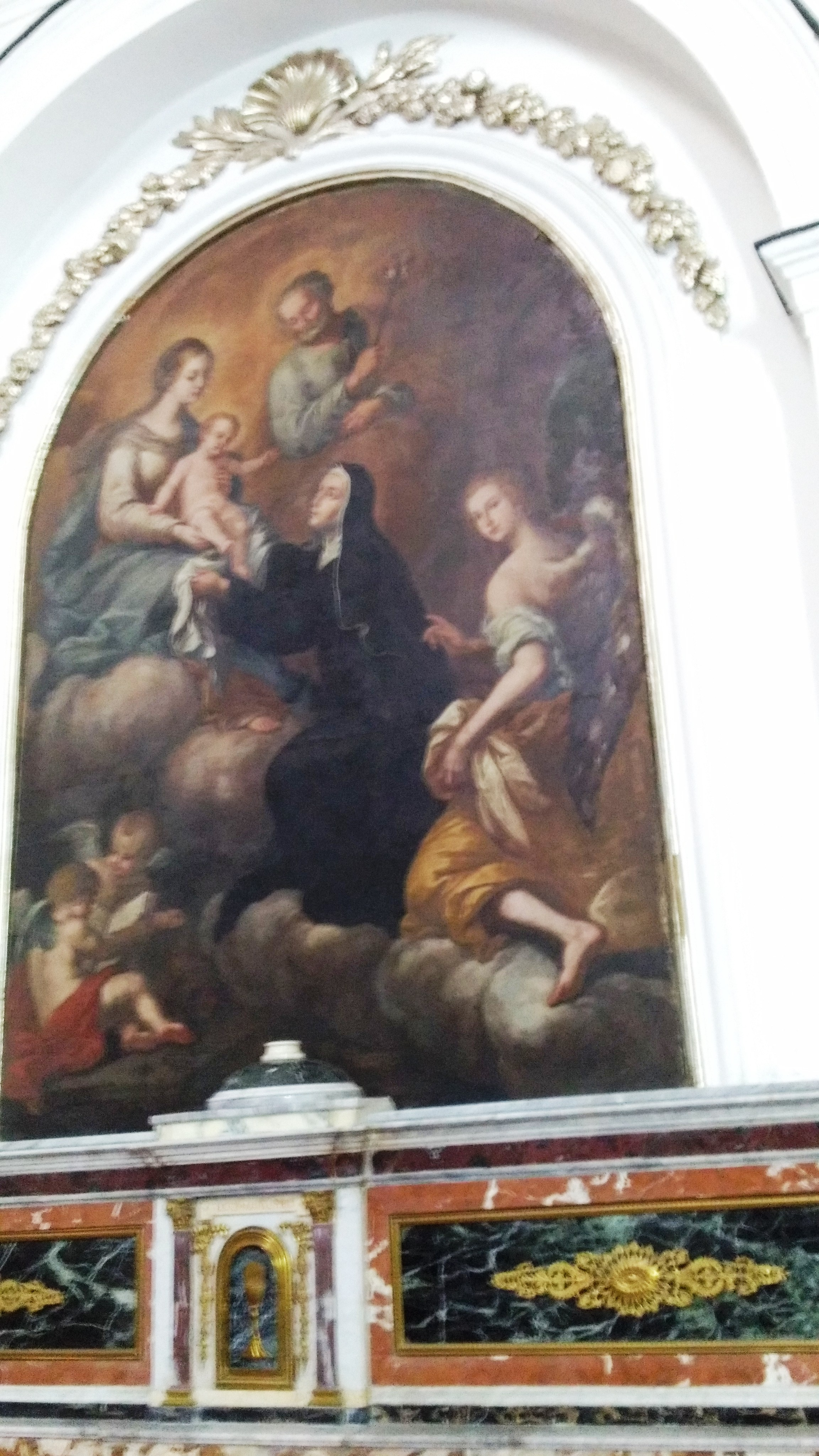
Saint Francesca Romana

Inside the nunnery there are the following paintings:

- The saint of the Guardian Angel, an old painting
- Saint Atanasio, Christ and the Virgin Mary (by an unknown author)
- Saint Joseph
- Saint Benedict
- Ecce Homo
- Our Lady of Sorrows
- Our Lady of Miracles (Maria Santissima dei Miracoli,1784), a painting by an unknown author
- Maria Santissima dei Miracoli: a painting on a plate, assigned to Giuseppe Renda
- Saint Benedict, canvas by Francesco Alesi, a priest
- Saint Scolastica, canvas by Francesco Alesi, a priest
- Saint Benedict and saint Scolastica talking, a tablet by Francesco Alesi, a priest
- Saint Cecilia, a tablet, probably made by Francesco Alesi.

== See also ==
- Catholic Church in Italy

== Sources ==
- Cataldo, Carlo (1982). Guida storico-artistica dei beni culturali di Alcamo-Calatafimi-Castellammare del Golfo p. 38-40 (in Italian). Alcamo.
- Cataldo, Carlo (1998). Le riparate: il reclusorio dell'Angelo Custode di Alcamo nella storia del costume di Sicilia (in Italian). Alcamo: ed. Campo.
- Mirabella, F.M. (1981). Sul Reclutamento delle Donne Riparate di Alcamo e altre note storiche (in Italian). Alcamo: Sarograf.
