= Santifaller =

Santifaller is an Italian surname and infers from the village Santuel located in the Italian Alps Brixen. Notable people with the surname include:

- Leo Santifaller (1890–1974), Austrian historian
