= Leo Santifaller =

Austrian historian (1890–1974)

Leo Santifaller (24 July 1890 in Kastelruth – 5 September 1974 in Vienna) was an Austrian historian of South Tyrolean origin. He was director-general of the National Archives of Austria. Santifaller was director of the Bolzano State Archives (1921–1927), professor at the University of Breslau (1929–1942/43) and at the University of Vienna (1942/43–1962), head of the Institute for Austrian Historical Research (1945–1962), General Director of the Austrian State Archives (1945–1955), Director of the Austrian Cultural Institute in Rome (1956–1964), founder of specialist journals, honorary doctorate at four universities and member of numerous scientific organizations such as the Austrian Academy of Sciences .

He was one of the most influential historians in post-war Austria.

== Life ==
=== Origin and Youth ===
According to Santifaller, the Santifallers themselves are an old Ladin family who are said to have had their rural residence in the mountains of South Tyrol even before the Romans and Teutons. It has been documented in the Brixen loan books since the 15th century. In the 17th century, a branch of the family moved to Kastelruth, where the Santifallers have also lived in an old noble residence, the Lafayhof, since 1813. Both Santifaller's grandfather Georg (1814–1896) and father Michael (1845–1923) later owned this farm.

Santifaller's father had studied law in Innsbruck, was a full-time notary in Kastelruth in addition to his function as a landowner.

=== Education ===
Even before graduating from high school, Santifaller was determined to become a scientist, historian or an astronomer. He studied at the University of Vienna. At the University of Vienna he studied mathematics and physics where he was discouraged by dismissive professors. He attended a speech by the historian Oswald Redlich in 1911 and then decided to become a historian himself.

After a few semesters in Vienna, Santifaller went to Freiburg im Breisgau, supported by a state scholarship, from the summer semester of 1914, where Heinrich Finke encouraged him to work in the field of Spanish document theory and palaeography.

== Career ==
=== Head of the State Archives Bolzano ===
Immediately after the end of the World War, from 1918, archival holdings in Innsbruck and Vienna that had been created in South Tyrol were delivered to Italy in accordance with the principle of provenance. At the request from Italy, Oswald Redlich proposed Santifaller as head of the new State Archives of Bolzano. Santifaller started work in August 1921 and held the management position until the beginning of 1927.

When he resumed duties, he was given the Maretsch Castle as an archive building, 150 railway wagons with archival materials (with the archives of the South Tyrolean authorities and the Brixen monastery) and a former Austrian gendarmerie sergeant as an assistant. The archive was set up and accessible to the public within a year. Santifaller also acquired a reference library for scientific work and began to publish books: especially his book on the Brixen cathedral chapter and source editions such as the Wintheri calendar.

=== Collaboration with the Monumenta Germaniae Historica and Habilitation in Berlin ===
While Santifaller was planning his habilitation in Munich, Paul Fridolin Kehr made a decisive contribution to his life by offering him the first assistant position at the Monumenta Germaniae Historica (MGH) in Berlin. He did research in the archives and the library of the Vatican and got a quarter-hour special audience with Pius XI with his wife.

=== Professorship in Wroclaw ===
In November 1929, Santifaller succeeded Franz Kampers appointed full professor of History and modern times at the University of Breslau. During the almost 14 years in Wroclaw, Santifaller published writings on the history of the Silesian region, studies on the history of the class, on questions of palaeography, the writing system and the doctrine of documents, researched the papal chancellery and worked on editions of the Silesian document book and the Brixen documents. He was a member of the Historical Commission for Silesia.

=== Professor in Vienna ===
After he had been on lists of proposals for other chairs three times (1935 in Munich, 1937 in Graz and 1940 in Vienna), Santifaller was appointed to Vienna in November 1942 and took up his professorship in the following April for the history of the Middle Ages and auxiliary historical sciences. He immediately started teaching and research and in November 1943 the Santifallers moved to an apartment in the 1st district of Vienna (Singerstraße 27/2), which, together with most of the Santifallers' scientific collections, was responsible for the later air raids on Vienna. Santifaller refused to flee the city, which had been bombed since September 1944, stayed with his sick wife in Vienna and continued teaching until mid-March 1945.

As early as April 1945, Santifaller began again with his scientific work, among other things, the Vienna Diplomata department of the MGH was reconstituted, which is now the edition of the diplomas of Konrad III.

=== Retirement ===
In 1962 Santifaller retired and from then on concentrated on his various management functions in several commissions of the Austrian Academy of Sciences. In addition, he worked on the history of historical research, which he distinguished as an exact science from historiography as literary art.

== Death ==
Santifaller died in Vienna in September 1974 and was buried in the Kastelruth family grave.

== Work ==
Santifaller's main research interests were the history of South Tyrol, diplomacy, the Liber Diurnus and the Ottonian-Salian imperial church system. As a diplomat, Santifaller dealt in the 1920s with the documents of the Bressanone Cathedral Chapter, in the 1930s with the management of the Silesian Document Book and in his last creative period with the "Censimento", the directory of all papal documents of Innocent III that were originally handed down in Austria until Martin V.

== Awards ==
- Honorary doctorates in Freiburg (1960), Graz (1963), Innsbruck (1965) and Salzburg (1970)
- 1961: Austrian Decoration of Honor for Science and Art
- 1970: Wilhelm Hartel Prize
- 1977: Santifallerstraße in Vienna- Donaustadt (22nd district)
- Honorary citizen of the municipality of Kastelruth
- Decoration of Honour for Services to the Republic of Austria
- Order of St. Gregory the Great
- Order of Merit of the Federal Republic of Germany

== Literature ==
=== Review articles and reference works ===
- Fritz Fellner, Doris A. Corradini: Austrian history in the 20th century. A biographical-bibliographical lexicon. Böhlau, Vienna 2006, ISBN 3-205-77476-0, pp. 353 f. (= Publications of the Commission for Modern History of Austria, 99).
- Winfried Stelzer: Santifaller, Leo. In: Neue Deutsche Biographie (NDB). Volume 22, Duncker & Humblot, Berlin 2005, ISBN 3-428-11203-2, p. 431 f.
- Wolfgang Stump: Leo Santifaller. In: Rüdiger vom Bruch, Rainer A. Müller (Ed.): Historikerlexikon. Beck, Munich 1991, p. 271.
- Hannes Obermair: Leo Santifaller (1890–1974). Von Archiven, Domkapiteln und Biografien. In: Karel Hruza (Ed.): Österreichische Historiker 1900–1945. Lebensläufe und Karrieren in Österreich, Deutschland und der Tschechoslowakei in wissenschaftsgeschichtlichen Porträts. Böhlau, Vienna 2008, pp. 597–617.
- Michael Fahlbusch, Ingo Haar, Alexander Pinwinkler (eds.): Handbook of völkisch sciences. Actors, networks, research programs. Walter de Gruyter, Berlin 2017, ISBN 978-3-110429893, pp. 682–687.

=== Necrologist ===
- Heinrich Appelt: Leo Santifaller. In: Communications of the Austrian Institute for Historical Research 82, 1974, pp. 556–560.
- Heinrich Appelt: Nekrolog Leo Santifaller. In: Deutsches Archiv für Erforschung des Mittelalters 30, 1974, pp. 640–642 ( online ).
- Heinrich Schmidinger: In memoriam Leo Santifaller. In: Römische Historische Mitteilungen. 16, 1974, pp. 17–21.
- Harald Zimmermann: Leo Santifaller. In: Almanach der Österreichischen Akademie der Wissenschaften 125, 1975, pp. 478–502.
- Richard Blaas: Leo Santifaller. In: Der Archivar 28, 1975, col. 225-228.
