= Maretsch Castle =

Château in South Tyrol

Coordinates: 46°30′12.52″N 11°21′1.65″E

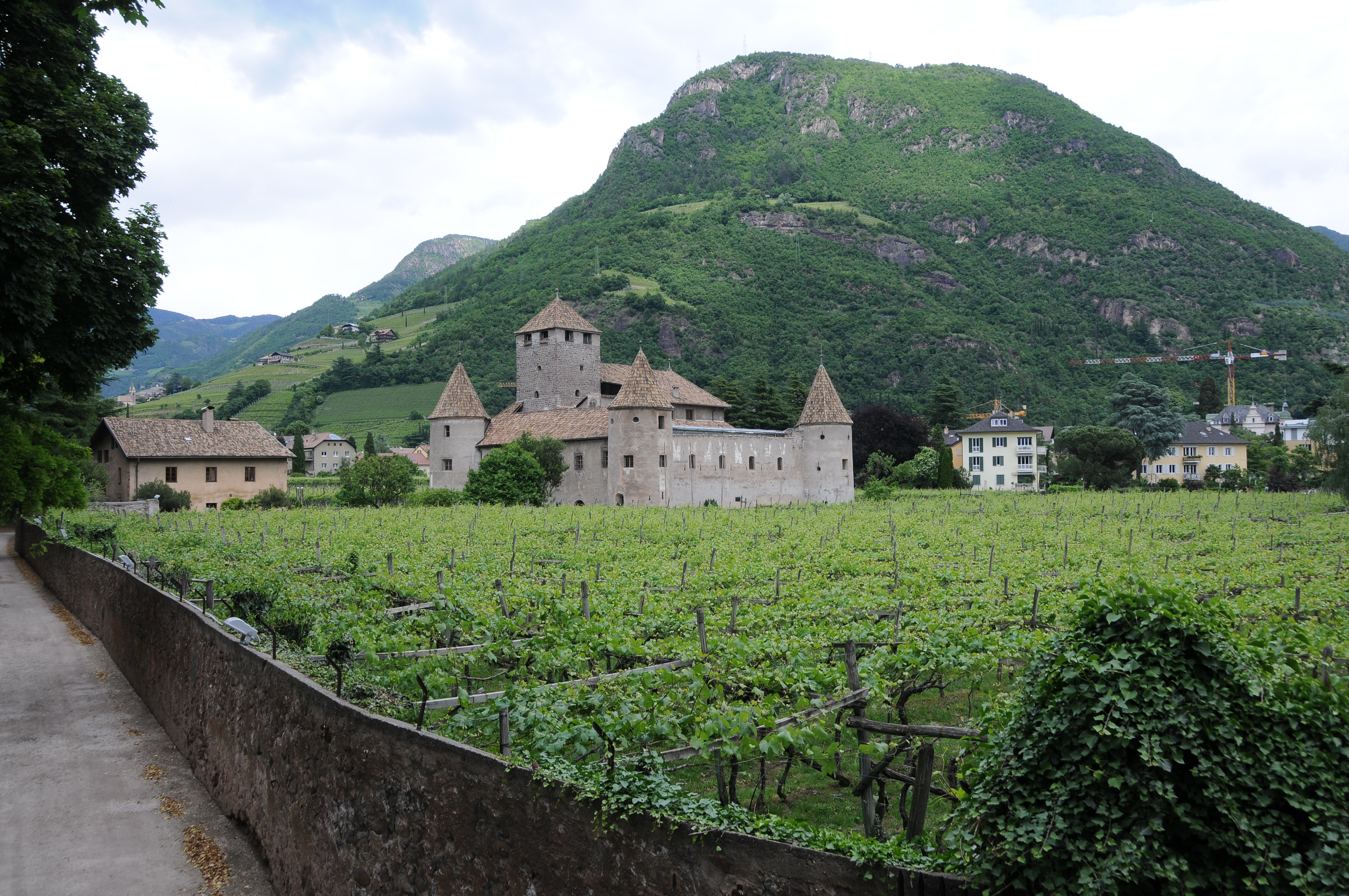
Maretsch Castle

Maretsch Castle (German: Schloss Maretsch; Italian: Castel Mareccio) is a castle located in the historic center of Bolzano, South Tyrol, northern Italy. It is a residence rather than a defense construction.

The oldest part of the castle dates back to the 13th century. The present form is due to the members of the Römer von Maretsch family, who transformed it in a Renaissance castle between 1560 and 1570.

Today the castle is a convention center, but it can be visited after previous reservation.
