= Minister of War (Italy) =

Former ministry in the Cabinet of Italy

- Ministro della guerra
- War flag

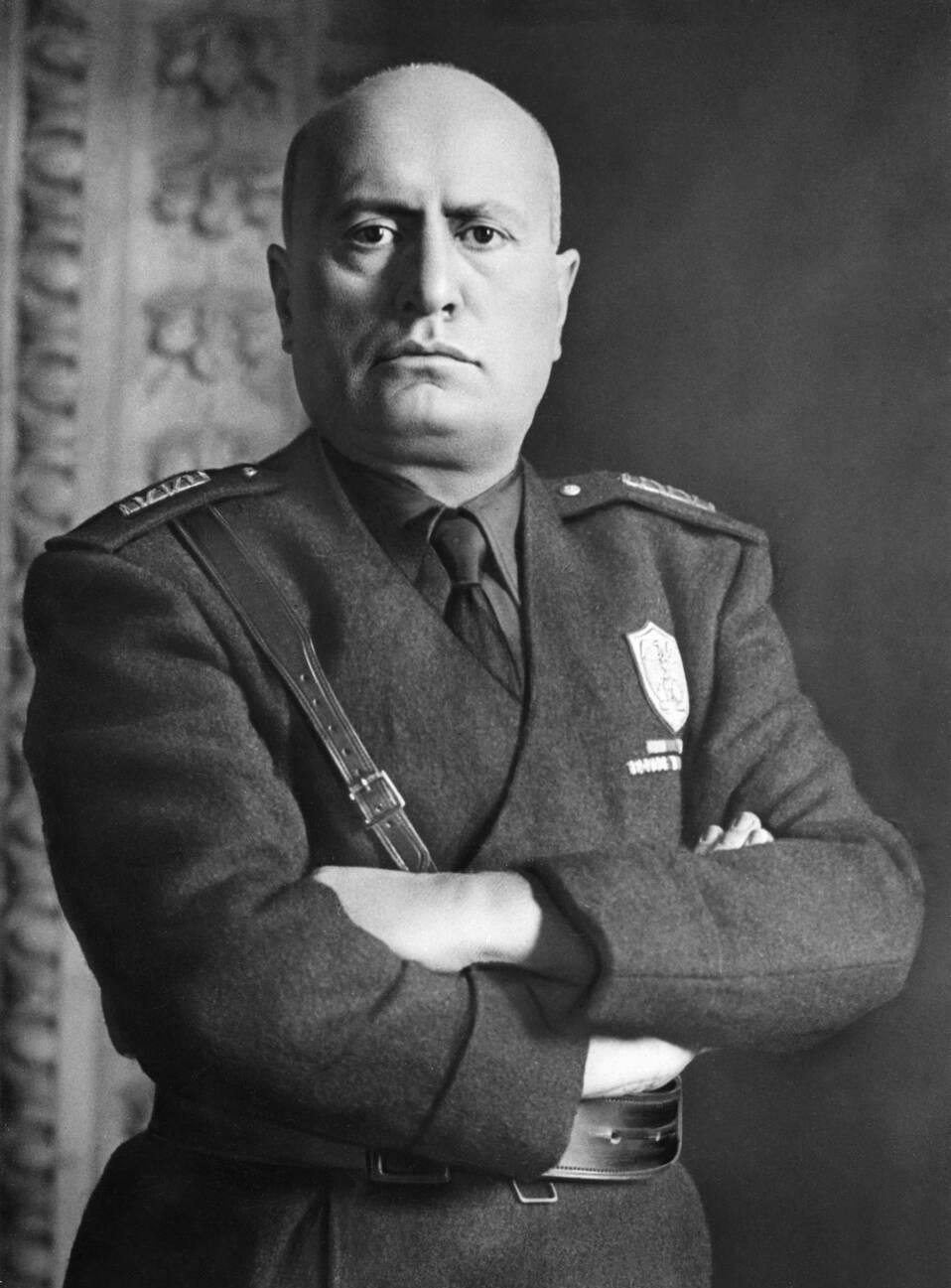
- Longest serving Benito Mussolini; 4 April 1925–12 September 1929; 22 July 1933–25 July 1943
- Ministry of War
- Member of: Council of Ministers
- Seat: Rome
- Term length: No fixed term
- Formation: 17 March 1861
- First holder: Manfredo Fanti
- Final holder: Cipriano Facchinetti
- Abolished: 14 February 1947
- Succession: Minister of Defence

The minister of war of Italy (Italian: ministri della guerra del Regno d'Italia), was the minister responsible for the Ministry of War, which in turn oversaw the Royal Italian Army under the Kingdom of Italy between 1861 and 1946 and the Italian Army under the Italian Republic from 1946 to 1947. The position was abolished in 1947 when the Ministry of War, Ministry of the Navy, and Ministry of Aeronautics were merged to form the Ministry of Defence under the oversight of the new position of Minister of Defence.

The first minister of war was Manfredo Fanti, a general of the Royal Italian Army, while the last one was Cipriano Facchinetti, a member of the Italian Republican Party. The longest-serving minister was the fascist dictator Prime Minister Benito Mussolini of the National Fascist Party.

== List of ministers ==
=== Kingdom of Italy ===
Parties

- 1861–1912:
  - Military
  - Historical Right
- 1912–1922:
  - Military
  - Italian Reformist Socialist Party
  - Italian People's Party
  - Agrarian Party
  - Liberal Union
- 1922–1943:
  - National Fascist Party
- 1943–1946:
  - Military
  - Italian Liberal Party
  - Christian Democracy

Coalitions

- 1861–1912:
  - Rightist coalition
  - Leftist coalition
  - Mixed coalition
- 1912–1922:
  - Liberal coalition
- 1922–1943:
  - Fascist
- 1943–1946:
  - Mixed coalition

| Portrait | Name (Born–Died) | Term of office | | | Party | Government | Ref. |
| Portrait | Name (Born–Died) | Took office | Left office | Time in office | Party | Government | Ref. |
|---|---|---|---|---|---|---|---|
| | Manfredo Fanti (1806–1865) | 23 March 1861 | 12 June 1861 | 81 days | Military | Cavour IV | |
| | Bettino Ricasoli (1809–1880) As Prime Minister | 12 June 1861 | 5 September 1861 | 85 days | Historical Right | Ricasoli I | |
| | Alessandro Della Rovere (1815–1864) | 5 September 1861 | 3 March 1862 | 179 days | Military | Ricasoli I | |
| | Agostino Petitti Bagliani (1814–1890) | 4 March 1862 | 8 December 1862 | 279 days | Military | Rattazzi I | |
| | Alessandro Della Rovere (1815–1864) | 8 December 1862 | 28 September 1864 | 1 year, 295 days | Military | Farini; Minghetti I | |
| | Agostino Petitti Bagliani (1814–1890) | 28 September 1864 | 31 December 1865 | 1 year, 125 days | Military | La Marmora II | |
| | Ignazio De Genova (1813–1896) | 31 December 1865 | 22 August 1866 | 234 days | Military | La Marmora III | |
| | Ignazio De Genova (1813–1896) | 31 December 1865 | 22 August 1866 | 234 days | Military | Ricasoli II | |
| | Efisio Cugia (1818–1872) | 22 August 1866 | 10 April 1867 | 231 days | Military | Ricasoli II | |
| | Genova Giovanni Thaon di Revel (1817–1910) | 10 April 1867 | 27 October 1867 | 200 days | Military | Rattazzi II | |
| | Ettore Bertolè-Viale (1829–1892) | 27 October 1867 | 14 December 1869 | 2 years, 48 days | Military | Menabrea I·II·III | |
| | Giuseppe Govone (1825–1872) | 14 December 1869 | 7 September 1870 | 267 days | Military | Lanza | |
| | Cesare Ricotti-Magnani (1822–1917) | 7 September 1870 | 20 November 1876 | 6 years, 74 days | Military | Lanza; Minghetti II | |
| | Cesare Ricotti-Magnani (1822–1917) | 7 September 1870 | 20 November 1876 | 6 years, 74 days | Military | Depretis I | |
| | Luigi Mezzacapo (1814–1885) | 20 November 1876 | 24 March 1878 | 1 year, 124 days | Military | Depretis I·II | |
| | Giovanni Bruzzo (1824–1890) | 24 March 1878 | 24 October 1878 | 214 days | Military | Cairoli I | |
| | Cesare Bonelli (1821–1904) | 24 October 1878 | 19 December 1878 | 61 days | Military | Cairoli I | |
| | Gustavo Mazè de la Roche (1824–1886) | 19 December 1878 | 14 July 1879 | 207 days | Military | Depretis III | |
| | Cesare Bonelli (1821–1904) | 14 July 1879 | 13 July 1880 | 365 days | Military | Cairoli II·III | |
| | Ferdinando Acton (1832–1891) | 13 July 1880 | 27 July 1880 | 14 days | Military | Ciaroli III | |
| | Bernardino Milon (1829–1881) | 27 July 1880 | 25 March 1881 | 241 days | Military | Ciaroli III | |
| | Emilio Ferrero (1819–1887) | 25 March 1881 | 24 May 1884 | 3 years, 60 days | Military | Cairoli III; Depretis IV·V·VI | |
| | Cesare Ricotti-Magnani (1822–1917) | 24 May 1884 | 4 April 1887 | 2 years, 315 days | Military | Depretis VI·VII | |
| | Ettore Bertolè-Viale (1829–1892) | 4 April 1887 | 6 February 1891 | 3 years, 308 days | Military | Depretis VIII; Crispi I·II | |
| | Luigi Pelloux (1839–1924) | 6 February 1891 | 15 December 1893 | 2 years, 312 days | Military | Di Rudinì I | |
| | Luigi Pelloux (1839–1924) | 6 February 1891 | 15 December 1893 | 2 years, 312 days | Military | Giolitti I | |
| | Stanislao Mocenni (1837–1907) | 15 December 1893 | 10 March 1896 | 2 years, 86 days | Military | Crispi III·IV | |
| | Cesare Ricotti-Magnani (1822–1917) | 10 March 1896 | 11 July 1896 | 123 days | Military | Di Rudinì II | |
| | Luigi Pelloux (1839–1924) | 11 July 1896 | 14 December 1897 | 1 year, 156 days | Military | Di Rudinì III | |
| | Alessandro Asinari di San Marzano (1830–1906) | 14 December 1897 | 14 May 1899 | 1 year, 151 days | Military | Di Rudinì IV | |
| | Alessandro Asinari di San Marzano (1830–1906) | 14 December 1897 | 14 May 1899 | 1 year, 151 days | Military | Pelloux I | |
| | Giuseppe Mirri (1834–1907) | 14 May 1899 | 7 January 1900 | 238 days | Military | Pelloux II | |
| | Luigi Pelloux (1839–1924) As Prime Minister | 7 January 1900 | 7 April 1900 | 90 days | Military | Pelloux II | |
| | Coriolano Ponza di San Martino (1842–1926) | 7 April 1900 | 27 April 1902 | 2 years, 20 days | Military | Pelloux II; Saracco; Zanardelli | |
| | Enrico Morin (1841–1910) | 27 April 1902 | 14 May 1902 | 17 days | Military | Zanardelli | |
| | Giuseppe Ottolenghi (1838–1904) | 14 May 1902 | 3 November 1903 | 1 year, 173 days | Military | Zanardelli | |
| | Ettore Pedotti (1842–1919) | 3 November 1903 | 24 December 1905 | 2 years, 51 days | Military | Giolitti II; Tittoni; Fortis I | |
| | Luigi Majnoni d'Intignano (1841–1918) | 24 December 1905 | 29 May 1906 | 156 days | Military | Fortis II; Sonnino I | |
| | Giuseppe Ettore Viganò (1843–1933) | 29 May 1906 | 29 December 1907 | 1 year, 214 days | Military | Giolitti III | |
| | Severino Casana (1842–1912) | 29 December 1907 | 11 December 1909 | 1 year, 347 days | Historical Right | Giolitti III | |
| | Paolo Spingardi (1845–1918) | 11 December 1909 | 21 March 1914 | 4 years, 100 days | Military | Sonnino II; Luzzatti | |
| | Paolo Spingardi (1845–1918) | 11 December 1909 | 21 March 1914 | 4 years, 100 days | Military | Giolitti IV | |
| | Domenico Grandi (1849–1937) | 21 March 1914 | 10 October 1914 | 203 days | Military | Salandra I | |
| | Vittorio Italico Zupelli (1859–1945) | 10 October 1914 | 4 April 1916 | 1 year, 177 days | Military | Salandra I·II | |
| | Paolo Morrone (1854–1937) | 4 April 1916 | 16 June 1917 | 1 year, 73 days | Military | Salandra II; Boselli | |
| | Gaetano Giardino (1864–1935) | 16 June 1917 | 30 October 1917 | 136 days | Military | Boselli | |
| | Vittorio Luigi Alfieri (1863–1918) | 30 October 1917 | 21 March 1918 | 139 days | Military | Orlando | |
| | Vittorio Italico Zupelli (1859–1945) | 21 March 1918 | 18 January 1919 | 303 days | Military | Orlando | |
| | Enrico Caviglia (1862–1945) | 18 January 1919 | 23 June 1919 | 156 days | Military | Orlando | |
| | Alberico Albricci (1864–1936) | 24 June 1919 | 14 March 1920 | 264 days | Military | Nitti I | |
| | Ivanoe Bonomi (1873–1951) | 14 March 1920 | 21 May 1920 | 68 days | Italian Reformist Socialist Party | Nitti I | |
| | Giulio Rodinò (1875–1946) | 21 May 1920 | 15 June 1920 | 25 days | Italian People's Party | Nitti II | |
| | Ivanoe Bonomi (1873–1951) | 15 June 1920 | 2 April 1921 | 291 days | Italian Reformist Socialist Party | Giolitti V | |
| | Giulio Rodinò (1875–1946) | 2 April 1921 | 4 July 1921 | 95 days | Italian People's Party | Giolitti V | |
| | Luigi Gasparotto (1873–1954) | 4 July 1921 | 26 February 1922 | 237 days | Italian Reformist Socialist Party | Bonomi I | |
| | Pietro Lanza di Scalea (1863–1938) | 26 February 1922 | 1 August 1922 | 156 days | Agrarian Party | Facta I | |
| | Marcello Soleri (1882–1945) | 1 August 1922 | 31 October 1922 | 91 days | Liberal Union | Facta II | |
| | Armando Diaz (1861–1928) | 31 October 1922 | 30 April 1924 | 1 year, 182 days | Military | Mussolini | |
| | Antonino Di Giorgio (1867–1932) | 30 April 1924 | 4 April 1925 | 339 days | National Fascist Party | Mussolini | |
| | Benito Mussolini (1883–1945) As Prime Minister | 4 April 1925 | 12 September 1929 | 4 years, 159 days | National Fascist Party | Mussolini | |
| | Pietro Gazzera (1879–1953) | 12 September 1929 | 22 July 1933 | 3 years, 313 days | National Fascist Party | Mussolini | |
| | Benito Mussolini (1883–1945) As Prime Minister | 22 July 1933 | 25 July 1943 | 10 years, 3 days | National Fascist Party | Mussolini | |
| | Antonio Sorice (1897–1971) | 28 July 1943 | 11 February 1944 | 198 days | Military | Badoglio I | |
| | Taddeo Orlando (1885–1950) | 11 February 1944 | 18 June 1944 | 128 days | Military | Badoglio I·II | |
| | Alessandro Casati (1881–1955) | 18 June 1944 | 21 June 1945 | 1 year, 3 days | Italian Liberal Party | Bonomi II·III | |
| | Stefano Jacini (1886–1952) | 21 June 1945 | 10 December 1945 | 172 days | Christian Democracy | Parri | |
| | Manlio Brosio (1897–1980) | 10 December 1945 | 13 July 1946 | 198 days | Italian Liberal Party | De Gasperi I | |

=== Italian Social Republic (1943–1945) ===
| No. | Portrait | Minister of National Defence | Took office | Left office | Time in office | Party | Cabinet |
|---|---|---|---|---|---|---|---|
| 1 | Rodolfo Graziani | Rodolfo Graziani (1882–1955) | 23 September 1943 | 25 April 1945 | 2 years, 151 days | Republican Fascist Party | Mussolini II |

=== Republic of Italy ===
Parties

- Italian Republican Party

Coalitions

- Mixed coalition

| Portrait | Name (Born–Died) | Term of office | | | Party | Government | Ref. |
| Portrait | Name (Born–Died) | Took office | Left office | Time in office | Party | Government | Ref. |
|---|---|---|---|---|---|---|---|
| | Cipriano Facchinetti (1889–1952) | 13 July 1946 | 4 February 1947 | 206 days | Italian Republican Party | De Gasperi II | |
Minister of Defence (see list)

== See also ==
- Minister of the Air Force
- Minister of Defence (Italy)
- Minister of the Navy (Italy)
