= Enrico Di Brocchetti =

Italian admiral and politician

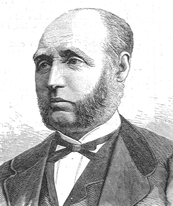

Minister of the Navy
- In office 24 March 1878 – 24 August 1878
- Preceded by: Benedetto Brin
- Succeeded by: Benedetto Brin

Senator
- In office 27 November 1874 – 18 November 1885

Enrico Di Brocchetti, Baron (Naples, 8 November 1817 – Torre del Greco, 18 November 1885) was an Italian admiral and politician, Senator of the Kingdom of Italy, and Minister of the Navy in the first Cairoli government.

== Early life ==
Enrico was the son of Baron it:Giuseppe Di Bronchetti, Minister of War of the Kingdom of the Two Sicilies and his wife Elisabetta Baccuet. On 3 September 1827 he was admitted to the Naval Academy of Naples from which he graduated on 9 August 1834 with the rank of ensign in the royal navy of the Kingdom of the Two Sicilies.

== Navy of the Two Sicilies ==
Four years later, on 13 February 1838, he became a brigadier midshipman. He was promoted to warrant officer on 24 October 1840, and lieutenant on 11 May 1848, shortly before he took part in the First Italian War of Independence. On 8 April 1857 he was promoted to frigate captain and two years later he assumed command of the frigate Ettore Fieramosca escorting the corvette Stromboli which carried Silvio Spaventa, Luigi Settembrini, Carlo Poerio and other political prisoners into exile in America.

In April 1859 king Ferdinand invited him to join the War and Navy Council of the Two Sicilies (13 April-24 May 1859, and 16 June-20 July 1859) and in September of the same year he assumed the position of sub-inspector for armaments. In May of the following year he took command of the Navy Institute, and in August he was promoted to brigadier general and assumed command of a frigate, being next assigned again to the armaments sector, and finally resuming command of the Marine College. In the meantime Giuseppe Garibaldi had reached Naples, and Di Bronchetti joined a considerable number of other Neapolitan officers in entering his service. Garibaldi promoted him to captain first class on 18 October 1860, although the following November a decree from Camillo Benso, Count of Cavour annulled the measure.

== Navy of the Kingdom of Italy ==
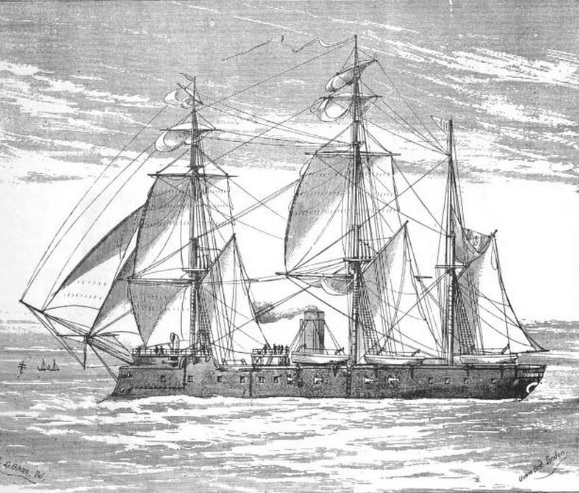
the San Martino

In April 1861, with the formation of the Regia Marina, he was again promoted to captain first class and made a Knight of the Order of Saints Maurice and Lazarus. Between periods ad commander of the Naval College (5 October 1860 – 16 May 1861) and chief of staff of the Southern Maritime Department in Naples, he commanded the steam frigates Garibaldi, Maria Adelaide and San Martino, and then, from 15 February to 30 October 1864, he was commander of the Royal Naval School of Genoa. In 1865 he was appointed rear admiral, joining the Admiralty Council (20 November 1865 – 3 May 1866).

Shortly before the Third Italian War of Independence, on 16 May 1866 he assumed the general direction of the military service at the Ministry of the Navy, particularly highlighting himself so much so that he practically became an undersecretary and the technical consultant of the Minister of the Navy Agostino Depretis. After the battle of Lissa he was concerned with defending the honor of the navy, and official report of the battle he authored, published in the Gazzetta Ufficiale of 2 August 1866, concluded: “it cannot be said that the [Italian] fleet achieved a victory, having not taken possession of Lissa and not destroyed the enemy squadron; it is certain, however, that the enemy did not achieve a victory and equally certain that the battle of Lissa will always be remembered with great honor for the Italian Navy”. The Westminster Review commented that “to the ordinary reader, with nothing but common sense to guide him, it seems little else than a miserable attempt to conceal a miserable failure.”

== Superior Council of the Navy and Senate ==
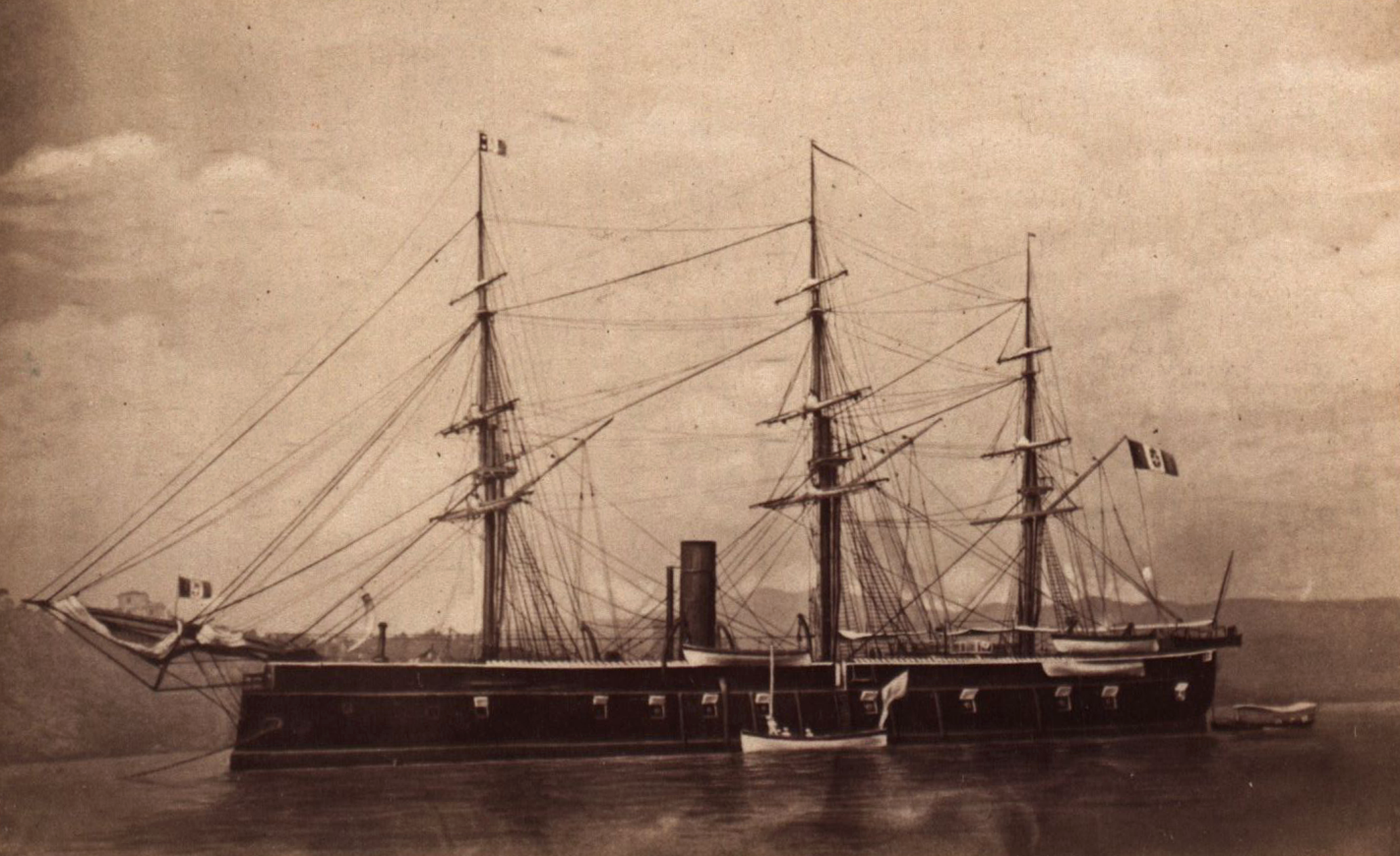
the Roma

After the war Di Brocchetti was President of the Maritime Administrative Commission for the Venetian Provinces from 10 October 1866 to 24 February 1867. For two years he was a member of the Superior Council of the Navy (6 January 1868 - 31 January 1870) the body supervising technical and strategic choices established after the failures of 1866 by Minister Agostino Depretis. In 1870 he assumed command of the third maritime department of Venice, and three years later, promoted to vice admiral, he became commander of the permanent squadron of the Italian military fleet. Having raised his ensign on the Roma, in August 1873 he set sail from Cagliari with his squadron for Cartagena. The revolutionary Canton of Cartagena had taken over some warships in the harbour, posing a threat to navigation in the western Mediterranean.

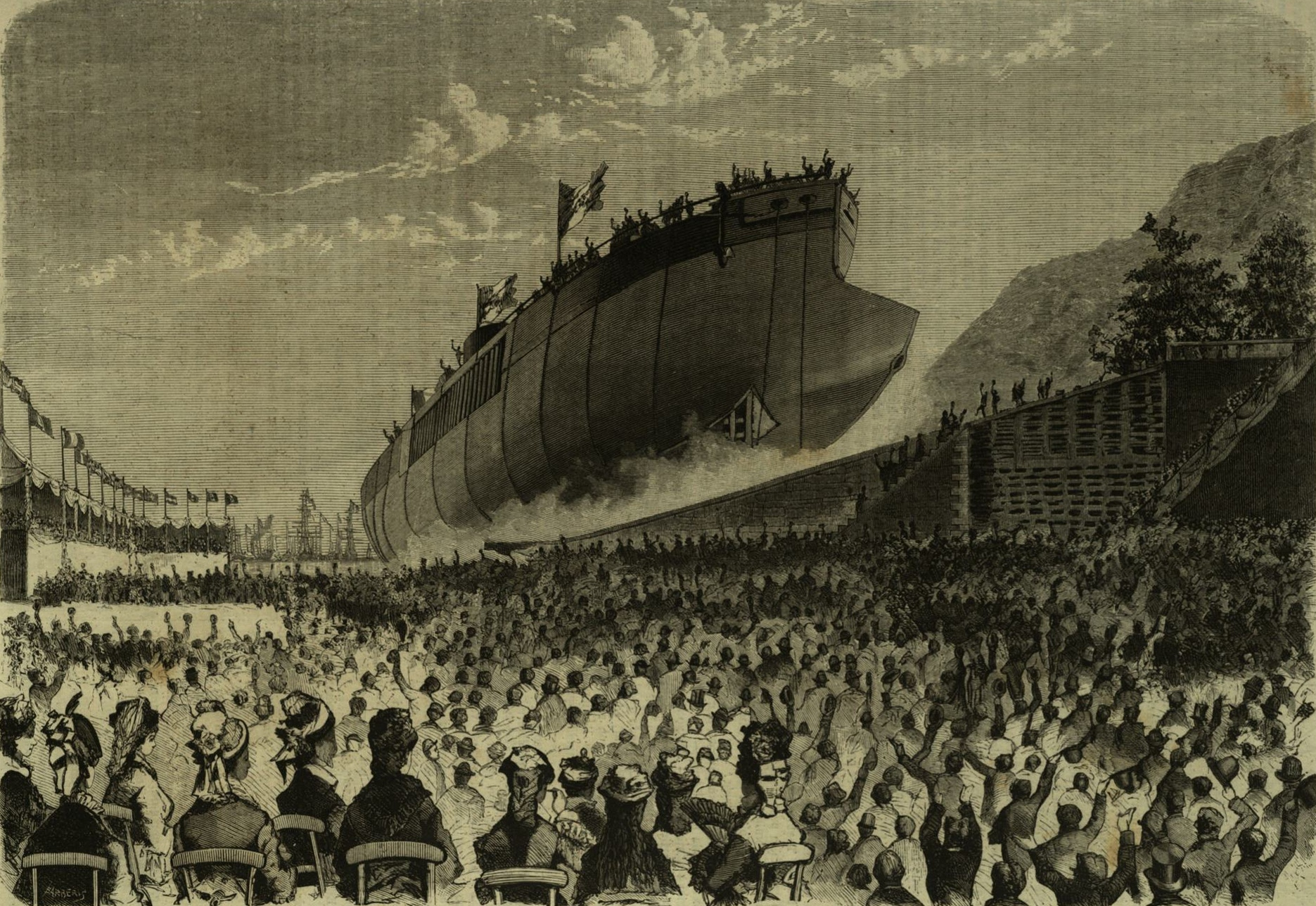
launch of the Caio Duilio

For his conduct in command of the permanent squad and in the Cartagena affair, he was appointed senator on 15 November 1874 and made honorary aide-de-camp to the king in 1876. He took initially little part in the activities of the Senate, supporting the Prime Minister Marco Minghetti and the Minister of the Navy Simone Antonio Saint-Bon.

After leaving command of the permanent squad he assumed command of the second maritime department of Naples, and in 1876 he assumed the presidency of the Superior Council of the Navy (6 January 1868 - 31 January 1870). In holding this position he tried to support the minister 's naval programs and laws. In 1877 it was he who informed the council about the armament needed for the new battleship Italia and on the construction of the battleships Caio Duilio and Enrico Dandolo, the largest, fastest and most powerful ships of their day.

== Ministerial career ==
In March 1878, following a political crisis in the cabinet led by Depretis, he was appointed Minister of the Navy in the new first government of Benedetto Cairoli. The king favoured Di Brocchetti over the leading candidates Benedetto Brin or rear admiral it:Federico Martini, as he did not want radicals in the key ministries of government.

A few days after his inauguration Di Brocchetti presented a series of bills, including one for the reorganization of the personnel of the Royal Navy and another for the organization of the arsenals of the Royal Navy. Of these, only the first was approved. He remained at the ministry only from 24 March-24 October 1878, so he had little chance to make his mark, but he did send Benedetto Brin and Felice Mattei on a mission to investigate the state of the fleets in France and Great Britain.

With the other two colleagues representing the Right in the cabinet, Luigi Corti, Minister of Foreign Affairs, and Giovanni Bruzzo, Minister of War, he resigned the day after Cairoli's speech in Pavia on 15 November 1878, which described military spending as unproductive; and because he was opposed to the freedom of association and assembly granted by the government, fearing it could undermine military discipline.

The end of his political and ministerial experience also marked the end of his military career, as, a few months later, in 1879 he requested retirement. He died in Torre del Greco on 18 November 1885.

== Family ==
Enrico Di Brocchetti married Margherita Maresca and one of their sons it:Alfonso Di Brochetti was also an admiral and a senator. They had another son called Giuseppe.

== Honours ==
Enrico Di Brochetti was awarded a number of Italian and foreign honours.

Silver Medal of Military Valor - ribbon for ordinary uniform

Silver Medal of Military Valor

Grand Cordon of the Order of Saints Maurice and Lazarus - ribbon for ordinary uniform

Grand Cordon of the Order of Saints Maurice and Lazarus
— 18 July 1878

Grand Officer of the Order of the Crown of Italy - ribbon for ordinary uniform

Grand Officer of the Order of the Crown of Italy
— 15 January 1872

Officer of the Legion d’Honneur (France) - ribbon for ordinary uniform

Officer of the Legion d’Honneur (France)
— 4 December 1849

Grand Cross of the Order of Isabella the Catholic (Spain) - ribbon for ordinary uniform

Grand Cross of the Order of Isabella the Catholic (Spain)
— 2 January 1871

Grand Cross of the Military Order of Aviz (Portugal) - ribbon for ordinary uniform

Grand Cross of the Military Order of Aviz (Portugal)

Knight of the Order of Saint Gregory the Great (Papal States) - ribbon for ordinary uniform

Knight of the Order of Saint Gregory the Great (Papal States)
— 18 July 1878
