= Emilio Ferrero =

Italian politician and general

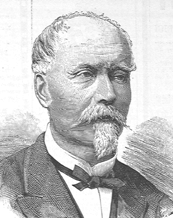

Minister of War
- In office 25 March 1881 – 24 May 1884
- Preceded by: Bernardino Milon
- Succeeded by: Cesare Ricotti-Magnani

Senator
- In office 11 May 1881 – 1 December 1887

Emilio Maurizio Ferrero (Cuneo, 13 January 1819 – Florence, 1 December 1887) was an Italian politician and general. He was a senator of the Kingdom of Italy in the 14th legislature. He served as Minister of War of the Kingdom of Italy in the third Cairoli government and in the fourth, fifth and sixth Depretis governments.

== Early life and career ==
A student of the Royal Academy of Turin, he took part in the First Italian War of Independence as a captain, earning an honorable mention for the siege of Peschiera del Garda and the silver medal of military valor at the battle of Novara. In 1855-56 he was part of the Sardinian expeditionary force in the Crimean War, where he obtained another mention for the offensive march on the Chernaya. In 1859 he was awarded the rank of officer of the Military Order of Savoy for his conduct in the Second Italian War of Independence.

In 1862 he assumed command of the "Parma" brigade; the following year, appointed major general, he became director of the Military Academy of Modena, returning to active service during the Third Italian War of Independence. In 1870 he commanded the 13th division which was part of the force sent under Raffaele Cadorna to conquer Rome. In 1875 he assumed command of the 2nd division and in 1880, he led the IX Army Corps stationed in Bari.

== Minister of War, 1881–1883 ==
Successive Italian cabinets struggled with questions about the size of the army, the expense of building fortifications and the scale of military spending generally. In 1881 Bernardino Milon died in office while serving as War Minister and two senior generals, it: Teresio Bocca and Luigi Mezzacapo both declined the role because the government was not prepared to guarantee the military spending they felt necessary. Luigi Pelloux was also considered but rejected as being too junior at the time to take on a cabinet position over more senior officers. Eventually Prime Minister Benedetto Cairoli offered the post to Ferrero whom he had met the previous year in a royal visit to Apulia. When he accepted the role he was nominated as a senator.

Ferrero saw his task as being to ensure that Italy had military forces at its disposal that were equivalent in standard to those of the major European powers. His time in office was marked by significant developments that had a bearing on Italy’s military posture, notably the French conquest of Tunisia and the signing of the Triple Alliance with the German Empire and Austria-Hungary.

In November and December 1881 Ferrero he presented bills covering a wide range of military reforms. He proposed to increase the army from ten corps to twelve, increasing conscription by ten thousand men per year. To contain the consequent increases in costs he planned to discharge conscripts earlier so that the total armed forces did not exceed 200,000 men. He also abolished the General Staff Committee and with a decree of 29 July 1881 he established the new position of Chief of Staff of the army. He also led a major review of the state of Italy’s frontier fortifications.

== Minister of War, 1884 ==
1884 was a year of economic difficulties in Italy as well as of declining health for Ferrero. Political problems mounted too following a cabinet reshuffle in 1883 which brought in more focus from the Historical Right.

In March he introduced a bill for the expansion of the artillery and cavalry and a new plan of 243 million for extraordinary expenses. His proposals were harshly criticized by the former minister Cesare Ricotti-Magnani for their extravagance and opposed outright by Ferrero’s cabinet colleague Treasury Minister Agostino Magliani. Ferrero eventually managed to secure 105m for the cavalry and 45m for the artillery, spread over eight years.

Ferrero felt let down by the lack of support he received, and complained to Pelloux that he had been "deliberately deceived" into presenting the bills. In October 1884 he decided to resign, and was replaced by Ricotti-Magnani. With serious health problems, he asked to be placed on auxiliary duty. He died in Florence on 1 December 1887.

== Honours ==
Cavaliere di Gran Croce decorato di Gran Cordone dell'Ordine dei Santi Maurizio e Lazzaro - ribbon for ordinary uniform

Grand Cordon of the Order of Saints Maurice and Lazarus

Cavaliere di Gran Croce decorato di Gran Cordone dell'Ordine della Corona d'Italia - ribbon for ordinary uniform

Grand Cordon of the Order of the Crown of Italy

Commendatore dell'Ordine Militare di Savoia - ribbon for ordinary uniform

Commander of the Military Order of Savoy

Medaglia d'argento al valor militare (2 volte) - ribbon for ordinary uniform

Silver Medal of Military Valor (twice)
