= Bernardino Milon =

Italian politician and general

Minister of War
- In office 27 July 1880 – 20 March 1881

Member of the Chamber of Deputies
- In office 25 May 1880 – 20 March 1881

Bernardino Milon (Termini Imerese, September 4, 1829 – Rome, March 20, 1881) was an Italian general and politician. He was a deputy from May 1880 and Minister of War in the third Cairoli government (1880).

== Early career in the Bourbon army ==
The son of Pietro Milon and Cecilia Voces, was born into a military family of Spanish origin in the Kingdom of the Two Sicilies: his uncle, Francesco, was the last Bourbon governor of Gaeta and signed its surrender in February 1861 to the Sardinian general Enrico Cialdini.

On October 29, 1842, he was admitted to the Nunziatella Military School and when he graduated from the course for army officers in October 1849 he was assigned to the artillery brigade. Promoted to lieutenant the following year in the horse artillery company, in September 1852 he transferred to the "Re Artiglieria" regiment, and was made first lieutenant two months later. Promoted to captain and returned to the artillery brigade in January 1856, he was named captain first class on July 1, 1860 and shortly after, on August 2, sent to Calabria as chief of staff of the 3rd brigade under the command of General B. Marra.

Upon his arrival in Reggio Calabria, Milon came under the orders of General it:Fileno Briganti. On August 21, he was alongside the general during the failed attempt to recapture Reggio from the Garibaldians. The next day, he led eight companies of the 1st line regiment to the Piale camp and attended the war council of the Bourbon commanders which followed. The paralyzing indecision with which the council ended led to the opening of negotiations which brought about the complete retreat of Bourbon troops from Calabria. On August 23, 1860, Milon decided not to retreat with General Briganti, who was killed the same day by revolting troops. Instead, he remained at Villa San Giovanni to fulfil his duty to the end.

== Career in the Italian army ==
Just over a month later he returned to Naples where Giuseppe Garibaldi had arrived, and asked to join his army. Garibaldi agreed and a decree of October 22 named him major of the general staff. With this rank and position, in January 1861, Milon was one of the first ex-Bourbon officers to join the Italian army, with which he participated in the final stages of the campaign.

From November 1862, Milon was in Florence as deputy chief of staff of the 5th Military Department and, from February 1863, as chief of staff of the local military division. During the Third Italian War of Independence on May 27, 1866, he was appointed chief of staff of the 10th active division; five days later he was transferred to the 17th Division under Raffaele Cadorna. Assigned to the Army of the Po, he took part in the last phase of the war in Veneto and Friuli and was promoted to lieutenant colonel on 28 July. With this rank, at the end of the conflict, he was put in charge of the staff of the new territorial division of Udine.

== Anti-banditry campaigns ==
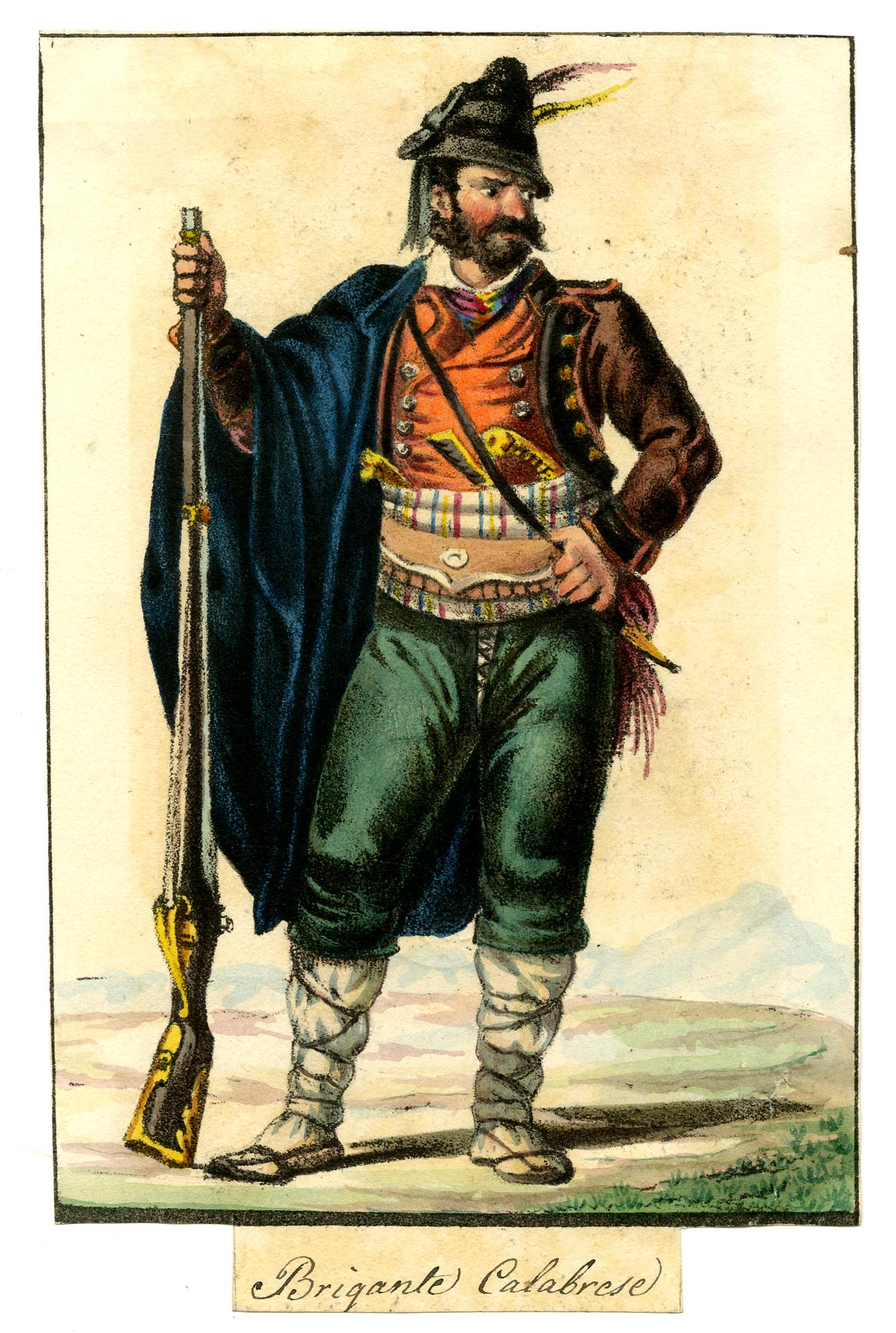
Calabrian brigand, 19th century

In April 1868 he was assigned to the military division of Catanzaro for operations to suppress banditry. The expiry of the Pica law on December 31, 1865 had led to an increase in brigandage, albeit not on the scale of the early 1860s. The commander of the Calabria military zone, general it:Gaetano Sacchi, welcomed the arrival of Milon, who in May was placed at the head of a military zone including the districts of Rossano and Castrovillari.

Existing measures to combat banditry were proving insufficient: the network of complicity provided by the "manutengoli", who helped the bandits through kinship, interest or fear, could not be broken. Milon therefore ordered suspects to be killed by faking incidents or escape attempts. In the space of a month, there were around thirty cases of this type, which had the desired effect of terrifying the local populations. Milon himself is said to have kept the preserved head of a bandit leader in a glass jar.

In December, Milon banned taking food from the cities to the countryside to starve out the bandits, and he had livestock herded into designated pastures and guarded by armed shepherds. The banditry did not stop: the same month, Milon was injured during a clash with it:Domenico Straface's gang, called "Palma", that had been in the bush since 1848. When he threatened to leave his post in the spring of 1869, the authorities asked him to stay, which he agreed to and then reestablished the draconian system he had used previously. In July, the gang leader Straface was killed by an accomplice. At the end of the year, the state of emergency was over, with 86 bandits killed, denounced or arrested, 200 "maintainers" referred to the judicial authorities and no less than 86 deaths by "accident" or during “escape attempts”. His departure in January 1870 led to a brief and limited resumption of banditry; but it was enough for Milon to return in May to extinguish the last outbreaks.

Despite a fierce press campaign and protests to the Chamber of Deputies of Calabria, no investigation was ever opened into his conduct. Instead, "for distinguished services rendered and the numerous merits acquired in the repression of brigandage in the Southern Provinces" he received first the Officer's Cross of the Order of the Crown of Italy and then even that of the Military Order of Savoy.

In October 1870 he was assigned to command the 12th "Casale" Infantry Regiment which he held until June 1872, when he was appointed chief of staff of the general command of the troops in Sicily, of which he became the effective leader on January 1, 1874. He remained in Palermo until May 27, 1877 when, promoted to division general, he became second in command of the general staff and, immediately after, he was named honorary aide-de-camp to the king.

By decree of March 31, 1878, Milon was appointed Secretary General of the Ministry of War, a position he held under the ministers Giovanni Bruzzo, Cesare Bonelli and Gustavo Mazè de la Roche, devoting himself above all to the strengthening of the borders and the renewal of armaments, notably by strengthening the Terni arms factory.

== Minister of War ==
In 1880 the constituency of Bari elected him as deputy of the XIV Legislature of the Kingdom of Italy and, on July 27 of the same year, he was appointed Minister of War in the Cairoli III cabinet. Commenting in his appointment, it:Il Fanfullo said “Bernardino Milon has one great quality - that of not being ambitious.”

In October 1880, he brought together the General Staff Committee and requested a new plan for the Kingdom's fortifications; then he presented to the House three bills concerning modifications in recruitment, the creation of a subsidiary officer position and the increase in the pensions of officers who participated in the campaigns of 1848 and 1849.

Seriously ill with a heart condition, Milon was able to do no more, leaving the ministry in the hands of the new secretary, general Luigi Pelloux. He died in office in Rome on March 20, 1881. His death notice in Roma Antologia Illustrata said “[he] died poor. And that, for a cabinet minister of our times seems to be without doubt the highest praise.”

== Honours ==
- Officer of the Crown of Italy

- Officer of the Military Order of Savoy

- Commander of the Order of Saints Maurice and Lazarus
