= Third Cairoli government =

20th Government of Kingdom of Italy

Cairoli III government
- 20th Cabinet of Italy

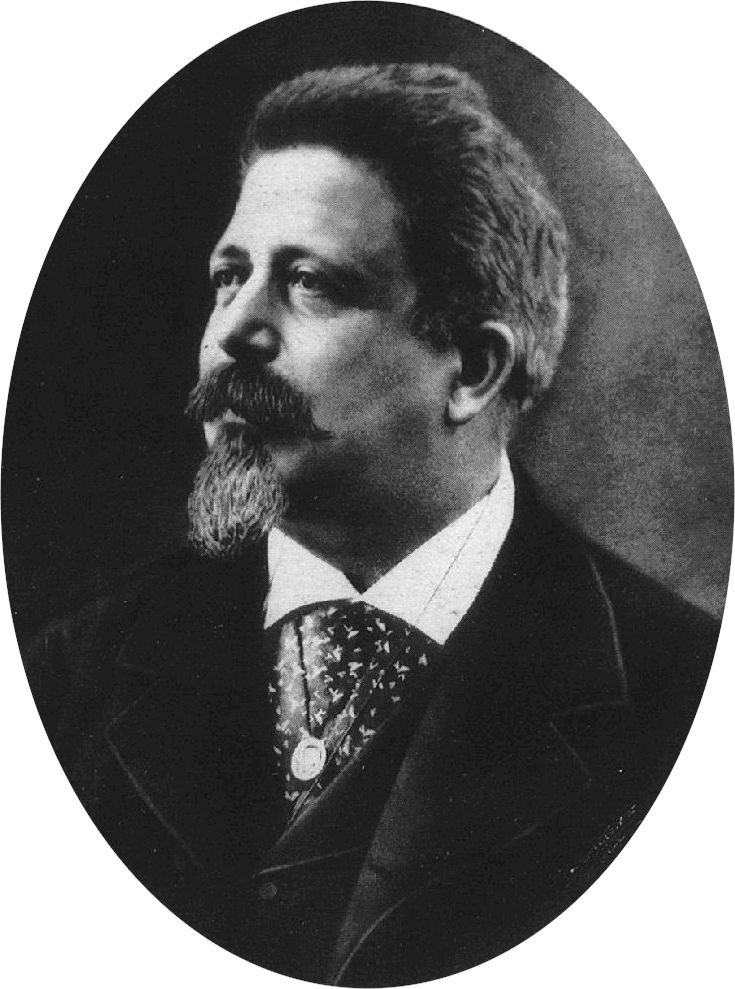
- Date formed: 25 November 1879
- Date dissolved: 29 May 1881

People and organisations
- Head of state: Umberto I
- Head of government: Benedetto Cairoli
- Total no. of members: 10
- Member party: Historical Left

History
- Predecessor: Cairoli II Cabinet
- Successor: Depretis IV Cabinet

The Cairoli III government of Italy held office from 25 November 1879 until 29 May 1881, a total of 551 days, or 1 year, 6 months and 4 days.

== Government parties ==
The government was composed by the following parties:

Party	Ideology	Leader
Historical Left	Liberalism	Agostino Depretis

== Composition ==
Office	Name	Party	Term
Prime Minister	Benedetto Cairoli	Historical Left	(1879–1881)
Minister of the Interior	Agostino Depretis	Historical Left	(1879–1881)
Minister of Foreign Affairs	Benedetto Cairoli	Historical Left	(1879–1881)
Minister of Grace and Justice	Tommaso Villa	Historical Left	(1879–1881)
Minister of Finance	Agostino Magliani	Historical Left	(1879–1781)
Minister of Treasury	Agostino Magliani	Historical Left	(1879–1781)
Minister of War	Cesare Bonelli	Military	(1879–1880)
Minister of War	Ferdinando Acton	Military	(1880–1880)
Minister of War	Bernardino Milon	Military	(1880–1881)
Minister of War	Emilio Ferrero	Military	(1881–1881)
Minister of the Navy	Ferdinando Acton	Military	(1879–1881)
Minister of Agriculture, Industry and Commerce	Luigi Miceli	Historical Left	(1879–1881)
Minister of Public Works	Alfredo Baccarini	Historical Left	(1879–1881)
Minister of Public Education	Francesco De Sanctis	Historical Left	(1879–1881)
Minister of Public Education	Guido Baccelli	Historical Left	(1881–1881)
