= First Cairoli government =

17th Government of Kingdom of Italy

Cairoli I government
- 17th Cabinet of Italy

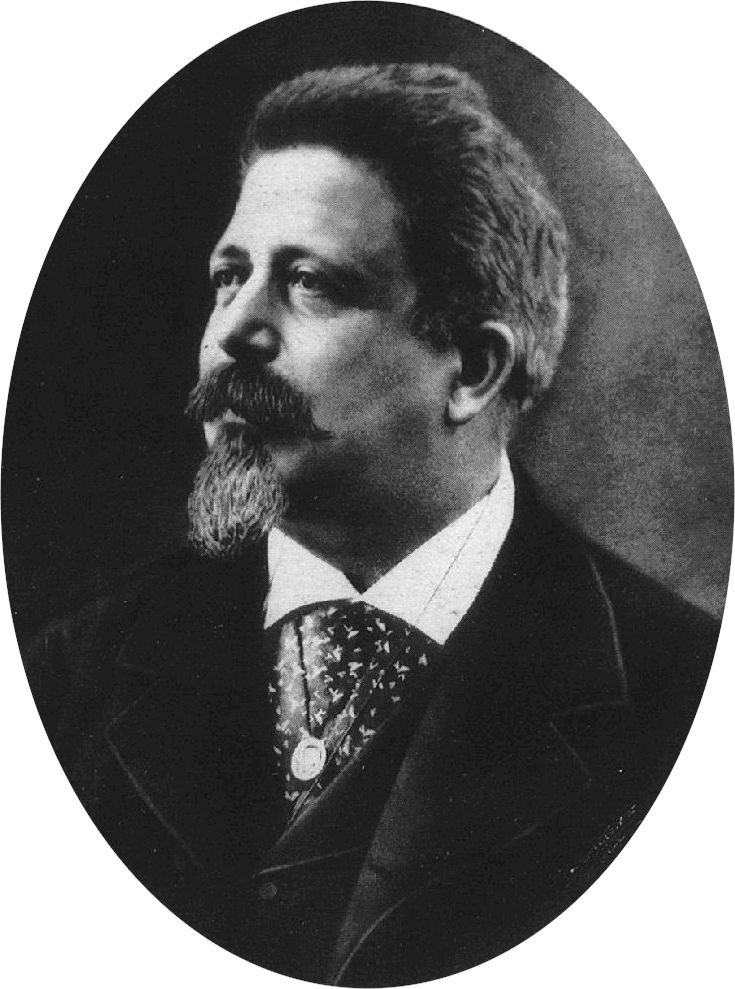
- Date formed: 24 March 1878
- Date dissolved: 19 December 1878

People and organisations
- Head of state: Umberto I
- Head of government: Benedetto Cairoli
- Total no. of members: 10
- Member party: Historical Left

History
- Predecessor: Depretis II Cabinet
- Successor: Depretis III Cabinet

The Cairoli I government of Italy held office from 24 March 1878 until 19 December 1878, a total of 270 days, or 8 months and 25 days.

== Government parties ==
The government was composed by the following parties:

Party	Ideology	Leader
Historical Left	Liberalism	Agostino Depretis

== Composition ==
Office	Name	Party	Term
Prime Minister	Benedetto Cairoli	Historical Left	(1878–1878)
Minister of the Interior	Giuseppe Zanardelli	Historical Left	(1878–1878)
Minister of Foreign Affairs	Luigi Corti	Historical Left	(1878–1878)
Minister of Foreign Affairs	Benedetto Cairoli	Historical Left	(1878–1878)
Minister of Grace and Justice	Raffaele Conforti	Historical Left	(1878–1878)
Minister of Finance	Federico Seismit-Doda	Historical Left	(1878–1878)
Minister of Treasury	Federico Seismit-Doda	Historical Left	(1878–1878)
Minister of War	Giovanni Bruzzo	Military	(1878–1878)
Minister of War	Cesare Bonelli	Military	(1878–1878)
Minister of the Navy	Enrico Di Brocchetti	Historical Left	(1878–1878)
Minister of the Navy	Benedetto Brin	Military	(1878–1878)
Minister of Agriculture, Industry and Commerce	Benedetto Cairoli	Historical Left	(1878–1878)
Minister of Agriculture, Industry and Commerce	Enrico Pessina	Historical Left	(1878–1878)
Minister of Public Works	Alfredo Baccarini	Historical Left	(1878–1878)
Minister of Public Education	Francesco de Sanctis	Historical Left	(1878–1878)
