= Music collections in Prato =

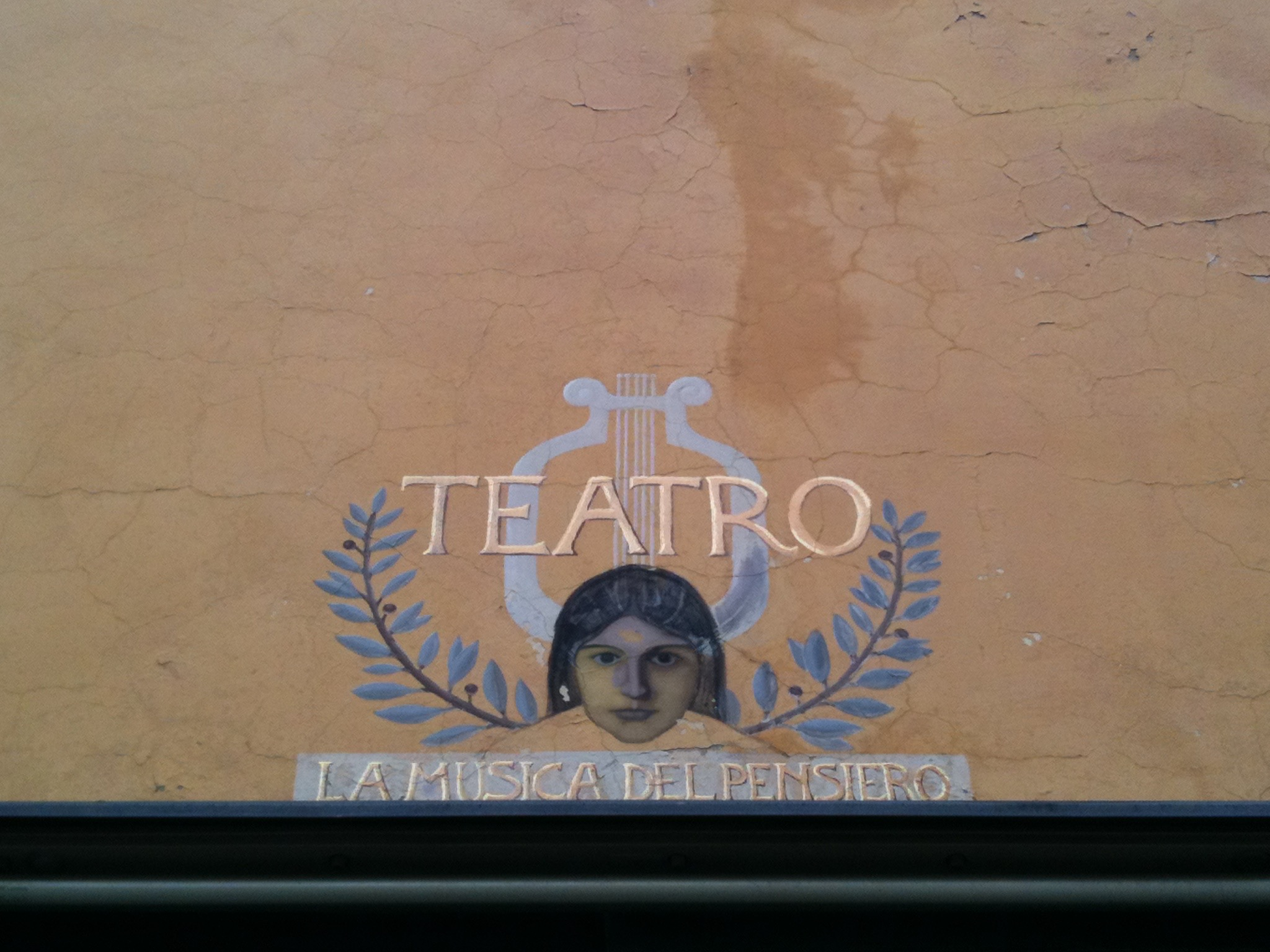
Banner of a historic theatre in Prato, fallen into disuse

Beginning with the recognition of musical collections in Prato conducted by the Center of Musical Documentation of Tuscany, it is possible to trace a synthesis of the history of the citizen’s musical production.

Following a chronological path linked to the most important musical subjects in Prato - institutions, composers and interpreters - and studying the handwritten and printed music brought to us, we were able to delineate a historical and cultural itinerary of the pratese musical life.

== History ==
The most antique musical collections of the city of Prato are the “pergamenacei” (made of parchment) liturgical book of the fourteenth century of Chapter origin, which are now preserved at the Museo dell’Opera del Duomo. The fourteenth-century cappella left little trace and merged with the new one, established in 1535. Beginning in 1981, a great deal of musical material of the latter institution belongs to the Archivio Storico Diocesano (Historical Diocesan Archive), in which there are many sources regarding its activities, as in the Archivio del Capitolo della Cattedrale (Archive of the Chapter in the Cathedral).

The cappella saw rotations of Kappellmeister such as Giovanni Francesco Beccatelli (1679-1734), Giuseppe Becherini (1758-1840), Augusto Borgioli (1821-1879), Luigi Borgioli (1864-1939) whose works are conserved in the Historical Archive of the Cappella of the Duomo, together with the works of the most performed artists of the different time periods (Giovan Carlo Maria Clari, Nicola Benvenuti, Giuseppe Gherardeschi). In 1981, The Historical Diocesan Archive also gathered the materials of 61 parishes together, which is preserved today in the Archives of the parishes. There are many chorals and sacred music, manuscripts and printed, that cover a vast period of time, from the fourteenth century to the twentieth century. The activities of the chapel were sided with the production of secular music, which left traces mostly beginning in the eighteenth century.

The Cicognini Boarding School has manuscripts of the performances staged by the boarders from 1780 until 1870, including comic operas and dance music from Mozart to Zandonai. Starting in 1842, the group «Concerto Cittadino Edoardo Chiti», of which the archive conserves a large amount of music of various genres used in their frequent concerts; and at the end of the eighteenth century, the choir «Guido Monaco» was formed, which has a musical archive consisting of a large amount of printed edition vocal music.

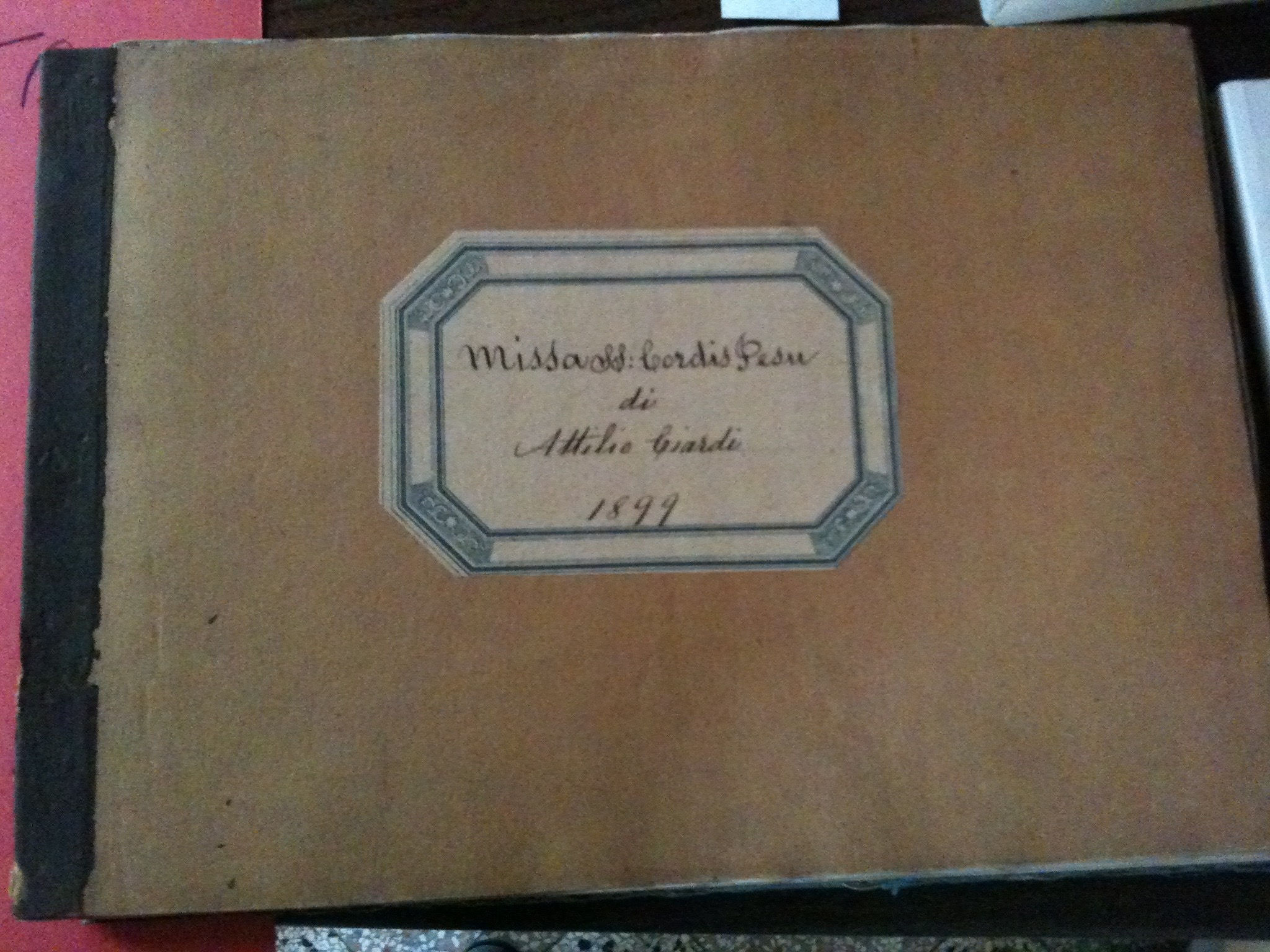
First page of autographed mass by Attilio Ciardi (1899), conserved in the music collection of «Guido Monaco» Choir

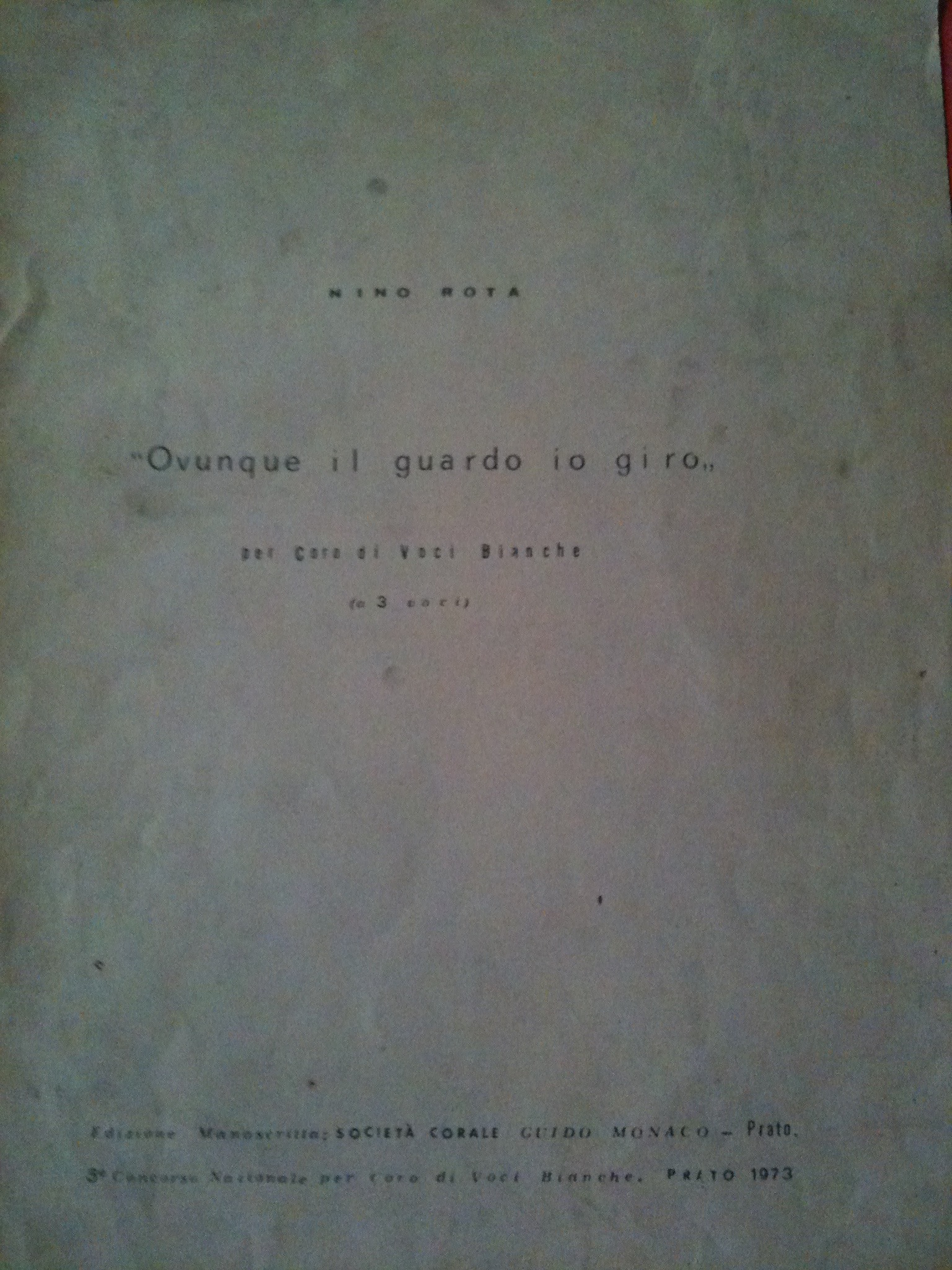
First page of Nino Rota's composition performed at Treble Festival held by «Guido Monaco» Choir in 1973

These institutions represented the musical vocation of the citizens for over a century, offering an example of one of the most important civil musical activities in Tuscany, to which many talented composers contributed. In the 19th century Cesare Ciardi, Attilio Ciardi, Attilio Nuti were active in Prato, and whose autographs are spread throughout the institutions in Prato. The personal archive of Attilio Ciardi is preserved in the Music School «Giuseppe Verdi», which today inherits the civil musical vocation that had inspired the Chiti Band and the «Guido Monaco» Choir. The 1900s saw the revival of the sacred production with the organist of the Cathedral, Guido Guasti, whose documents (especially those regarding the years between 1939 and 1947) are in the Historic Diocesan Archive, with the reopening of the Cappella in 1951, whose materials (printed sacred music in modern editions) are today in the Church of San Francesco, but above all with the activities of the secular composers who most influenced the musical possessions of Prato the 20th century. Dante Nuti, Giovanni Castagnoli, and especially Luciano Bettarini, one of the most important musicians of the 20th century, worked in Prato. What they left behind is preserved in the Historic Diocesan Archive and in great part, in their personal collections at the Music School «Giuseppe Verdi», which possesses also the enormous collections, of recordings and music, of some Pratese collectionists.

In 1969, the «Guido Monaco» Choir founded their children’s choir, and promoted of a competition for the citizens in which music by Nino Rota was also performed. Today this is preserved in the archive of the choir. Books dedicated to musical subjects (some of which come from the antique cappella of the 16th century) are in Roncioniana Library, in the Teatro Metastasio, and in the Salvi Cristiani Collection at the State Archive.

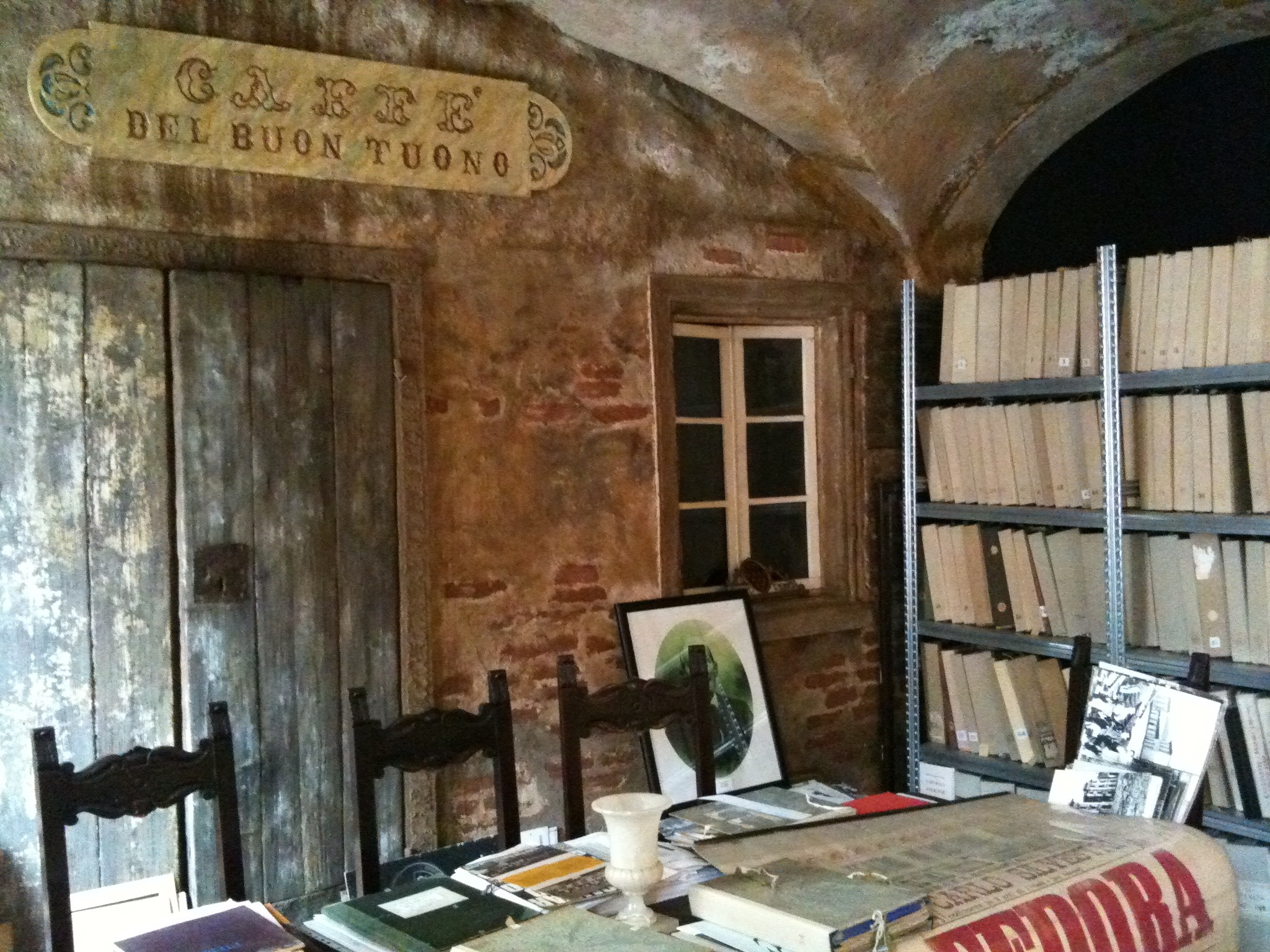
Inside of the Archive of the Chorale Association «Guido Monaco» in Prato

== List of musical collections ==
- Archivio Cicognini, address: Piazza del Collegio, 13: preserves the musical materials of the National Cicognini Boarding School: many materials for ballets and choirs (by Attilio Ciardi, Riccardo Zandonai, Wolfgang Amadeus Mozart etc.) performed by the boarders, above all in the period of 1780-1870
- State Archive, address: via Ser Lapo Mazzei, 41, the institution preserves:
  - Musical material of the Salvi Cristiani family
- Historic Diocesan Archive, address: via del Seminario, 28, the institution preserves:
  - Historic Archive of the Music Chappell: Archive of the antique 16th century cappella (formatted from a previous 15th century), comprising a lot of materials, including autographs, of the Kappelmeister and of the most performed composers of the various periods of time. You can find music by Giovan Carlo Maria Clari, Giuseppe Becherini, Giuseppe Gherardeschi, Augusto Borgioli, Luigi Borgioli, Attilio Ciardi, Cesare Ciardi
  - Cathedral's Archive of the Chapter: a part consists of the archive of the parte Duomo di Prato (preserved also in the Roncioniana Library)
  - Archivio Giovanni Castagnoli: Personal archive of the composer and organist, Giovanni Castagnoli
  - Musical material of the archives of the parishes: gathering together the belongings of the various parishes and diocese of Prato: many chorals (1300s), printed music from the 1600s, and Medieval codes, even from the 1200s, with musical notations.
  - Guido Guasti Music Collection: contains the compositions and the documents of Guasti, organist of the Cathedral in Prato from 1939 to 1947.
- Biblioteca Roncioniana, address: piazza San Francesco: preserves many musical monographs and some printed music.
- Library of the Teatro Metastasio, address: via Benedetto Cairoli, 59: possesses many audio recordings and more than 90 books regarding musical subjects.
- Concerto Cittadino «Edoardo Chiti», address: via Giovanni Di Gherardo, 8, the institution preserves:
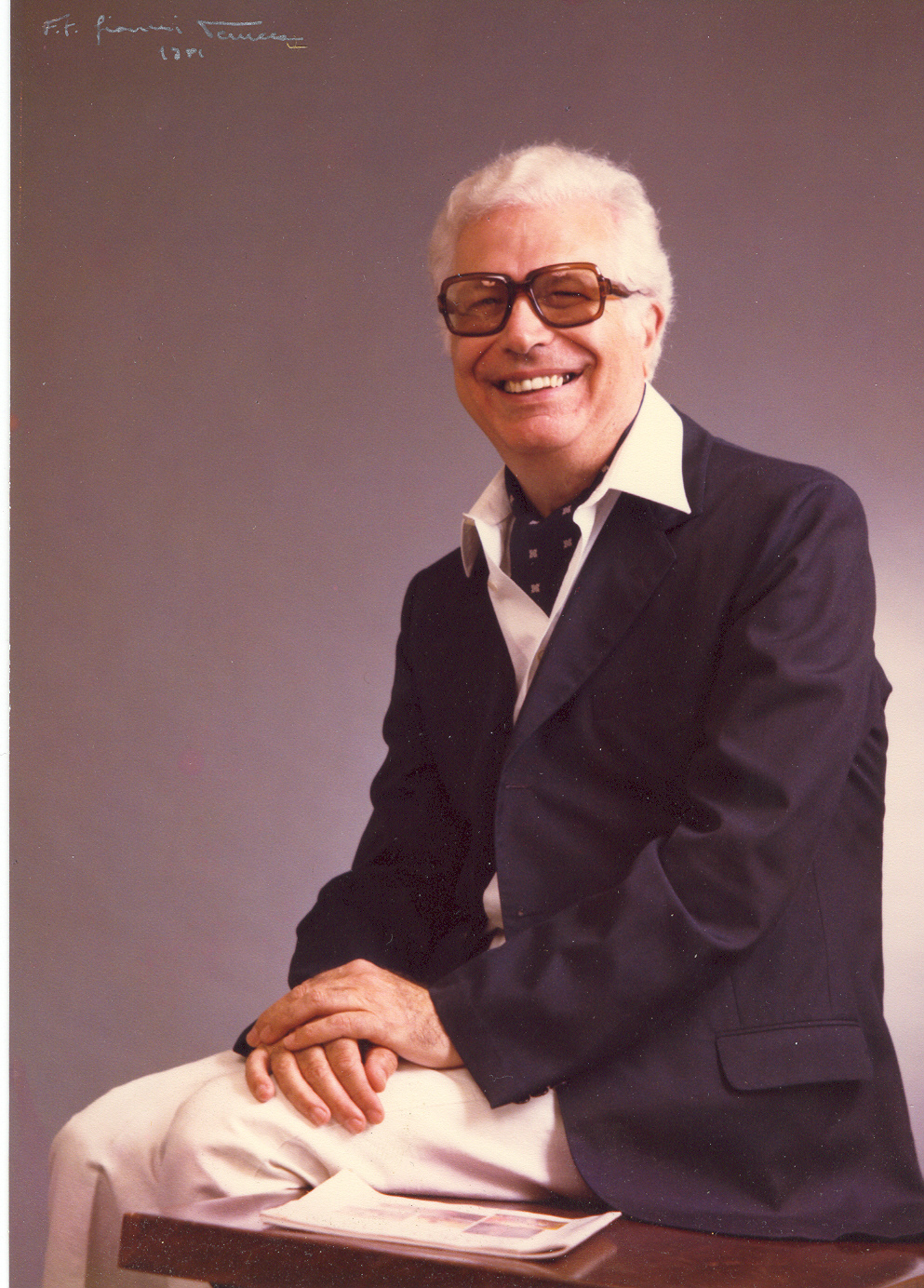
  Photo of Luciano Bettarini
  - Chiti Collection: archive of the Pratese band
- School of Music «Giuseppe Verdi», address: via Santa Trinita, 2, the institution preserves:
  - Music Library «Luciano Bettarini», contains the collections:
    - Bettarini Collection: has the private library and a large part of the archive of the Pratese master Luciano Bettarini
    - Alessandro Carraresi Collection: a collection of recordings
    - Adalberto Silenzi Collection: consists of many first editions of the literature regarding music critique (the collection is in part preserved also in the Lazzerini Library)
    - Attilio Ciardi Collection: a collection of music and documents by Attilio Ciardi and Cesare Ciardi
    - Attilio and Daniele Nuti Collection: personal archive of two composers, consisting above all of scores for voice and pianoforte of their works
- Library of the «Guido Monaco» Choir, address: via San Vincenzo: preserves the material for choral use, with a lot of handwritten and printed music mostly choral and sacred music; preserves an autograph of Attilio Ciardi dated 1899. Inside the library there is:
  - Archive of the Children's Choir «Guido Monaco»
- Modern Collection of the restored music chappell of the Cathedral, located at the Church of San Francesco, address: Piazza San Francesco, 10: contains the material used (with sacred music in printed and handwritten copies of the 20th century) of the new Cappella founded in 1951
