= Second Cairoli government =

19th Government of Kingdom of Italy

Cairoli II government
- 19th Cabinet of Italy

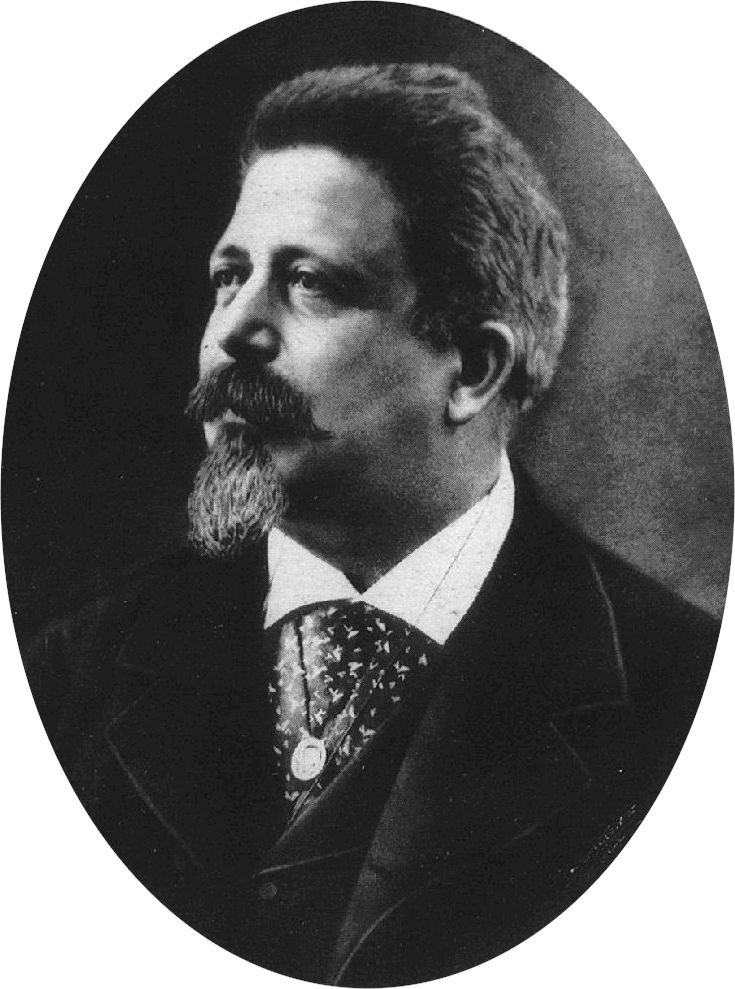
- Date formed: 14 July 1879
- Date dissolved: 25 November 1879

People and organisations
- Head of state: Umberto I
- Head of government: Benedetto Cairoli
- Total no. of members: 10
- Member party: Historical Left

History
- Predecessor: Depretis III Cabinet
- Successor: Cairoli III Cabinet

The Cairoli II government of Italy held office from 14 July 1879 until 25 November 1879, a total of 134 days, or 4 months and 11 days.

== Government parties ==
The government was composed by the following parties:

Party	Ideology	Leader
Historical Left	Liberalism	Agostino Depretis

== Composition ==
Office	Name	Party	Term
Prime Minister	Benedetto Cairoli	Historical Left	(1879–1879)
Minister of the Interior	Tommaso Villa	Historical Left	(1879–1879)
Minister of Foreign Affairs	Benedetto Cairoli	Historical Left	(1879–1879)
Minister of Grace and Justice	Giovanni Battista Varè	Historical Left	(1879–1879)
Minister of Finance	Bernardino Grimaldi	Historical Left	(1879–1879)
Minister of Treasury	Bernardino Grimaldi	Historical Left	(1879–1879)
Minister of War	Cesare Bonelli	Military	(1879–1879)
Minister of the Navy	Cesare Bonelli	Military	(1879–1879)
Minister of Agriculture, Industry and Commerce	Benedetto Cairoli	Historical Left	(1879–1879)
Minister of Public Works	Alfredo Baccarini	Historical Left	(1879–1879)
Minister of Public Education	Francesco Paolo Perez	Historical Left	(1879–1879)
