= Giuseppe Perrucchetti =

Italian general and politician

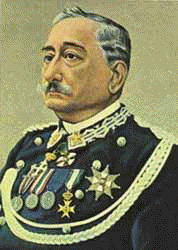
Giuseppe Perrucchetti

Giuseppe Domenico Perrucchetti (13 July 1839 – 5 October 1916) was an Italian general and politician, the creator of the Alpini corps.

He was born in Cassano d'Adda, in what is now the province of Milan in Lombardy. He studied architecture at the University of Pavia, but when he was twenty, he fled from Lombardy (at the time under Austrian domination) to enrol in the Piedmont army. He was a volunteer in the Second Italian Independence War and in the 1866 war against Austria, at which point he gained a silver medal in the Battle of Custoza and was promoted to captain.

In 1872, Perrucchetti proposed the creation of an infantry corps specialised in mountain warfare, for the defence of the mountainous Italian border, in an article published in the Italian military journal Rivista Militare Italiana. Perrucchetti drew examples from the mountain militias in the Roman age, the Cacciatori delle Alpi brigades, and the Volontari Cadorini led by Pier Fortunato Calvi. His proposal (although not the only one of its kind) is considered to have been the basis for the foundation of the Alpini by General Cesare Ricotti-Magnani, then-Minister of War, in the same year. Perrucchetti never joined the corps, nor did he ever command it.

Perucchetti later rose to the rank of Lieutenant General and was appointed a Senator of the Kingdom of Italy; he retired in 1910. He died in 1916, when the Alpini were operating in the Alps and Africa during World War I.
