= Carlo Felice Nicolis, conte di Robilant =

Italian politician and general (1826–1888)

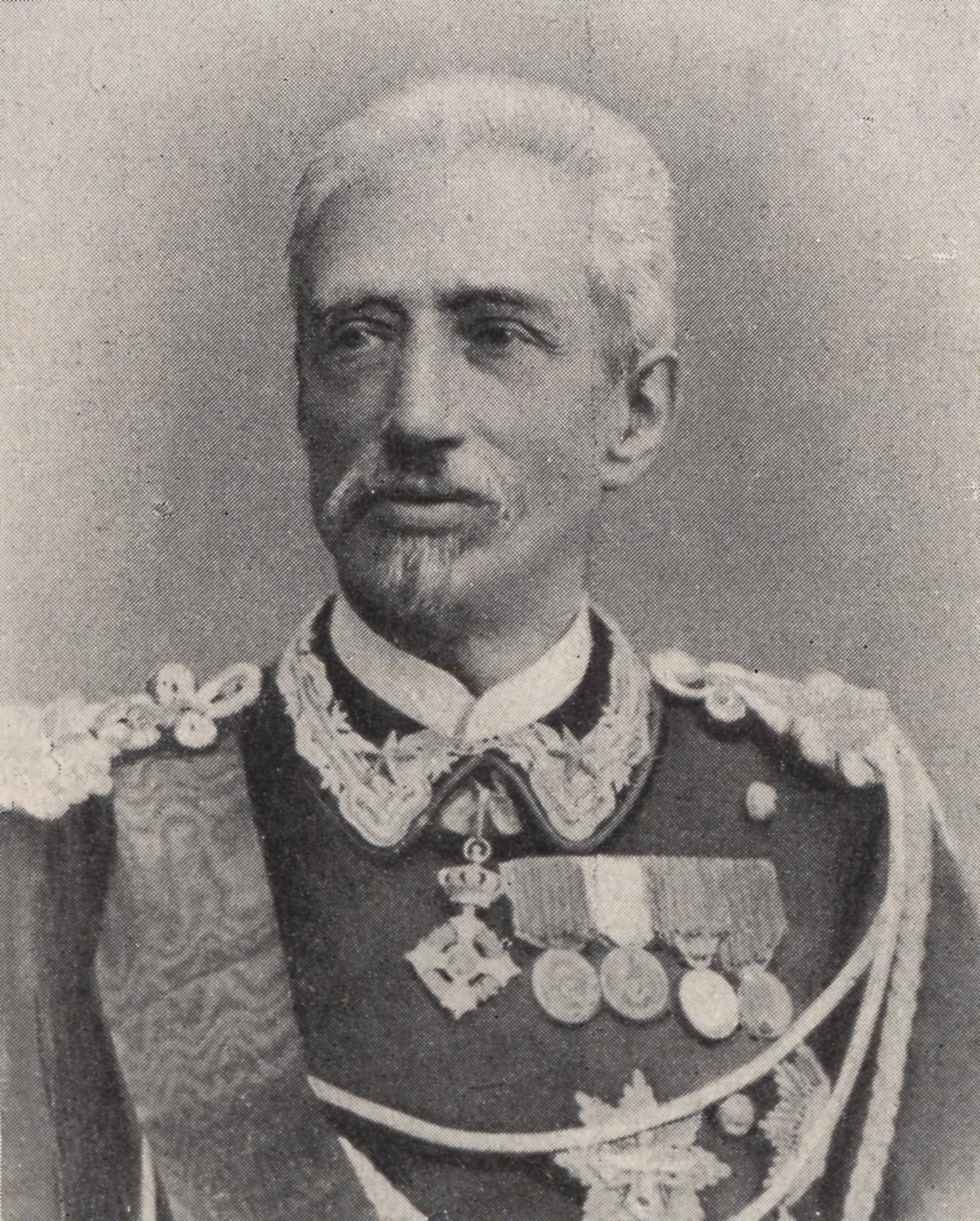
Carlo Felice Nicolis, conte di Robilant

Carlo Felice Nicolis, conte di Robilant (8 August 1826 – 17 October 1888), Italian statesman and diplomat, was a native of Turin.

== Life ==
He entered the army, and lost his left hand at Novara, where he was aide-de-camp to Charles Albert, king of Piedmont. He fought in 1859, and reached the grade of general in the Austrian campaign of 1866, after which he served on the delimitation commission. He was chief of the Military Academy, and in 1867 was made prefect of Ravenna to suppress political disorder. He was defeated at Turin in the elections for the Chambrin in 1870, and was sent in 1871 as minister plenipotentiary to Vienna, where he subsequently became ambassador.

He was connected with the Prussian nobility through his mother, he married an Austrian, a daughter of Prince Edmund Clary-Aldringen. In spite of the active part he had taken in driving Austria from Italy, he was a persona grata in Vienna, and his policy was steadily directed to an alliance between the two powers. This was accomplished by the secret terms of the Triple Alliance in 1882. He was recalled to Rome in 1885 to become minister for foreign affairs in the Depretis cabinet.

Robilant's independent attitude as foreign minister secured greater consideration for Italy from her allies, but he did not adapt himself to the exigencies of domestic politics, and his excessive unpopularity contributed to the downfall of the ministry on February 7, 1887, consequent on an adverse vote on the Massawa question.

Before leaving office, he completed the negotiations for the renewal of the Triple Alliance, and for its extension to cover Anglo-Italian co-operation in the Mediterranean. In the new Depretis-Crispi administration Robilant was not included. He was sent to London as ambassador in the next year, but died two months after his arrival.
