= Luigi Mezzacapo =

Italian general, patriot and politician

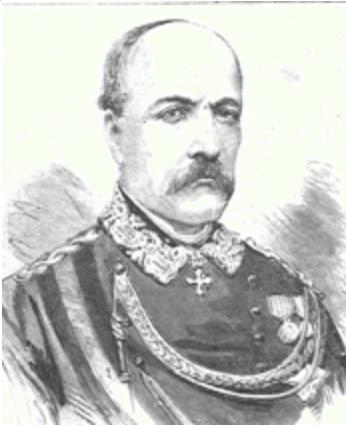

Minister of War
- In office 20 November 1876 – 24 March 1878
- Preceded by: Cesare Ricotti-Magnani
- Succeeded by: Giovanni Bruzzo

Senator
- In office 13 December 1870 – 27 January 1885

Luigi Mezzacapo (Trapani, 25 January 1814 – Rome, 27 January 1885) was an Italian general, patriot and politician.

== Youth ==
He attended the Nunziatella Military School between 1825 and 1832 where his brother Carlo, Giuseppe Salvatore Pianell and Enrico Cosenz were among his classmates. When he graduated he became an artillery officer in the army of the Kingdom of the Two Sicilies.

== First War of Independence ==
Appointed captain in 1847, in 1848 he was part of the expeditionary force of 15,000 men that the constitutional government of Carlo Troya sent to Lombardy, under the command of Guglielmo Pepe to help the Kingdom of Sardinia in the First Italian War of Independence. After the recall of the expeditionary force by King Ferdinand II Luigi Mezzacapo joined his brother Carlo and numerous other soldiers of the Sicilian army including Guglielmo Pepe, Enrico Cosenz, it:Cesare Rosaroll, Alessandro Poerio and it:Girolamo Calà Ulloa in besieged Venice where he distinguished himself in the defense of the city at the fort of Brondolo.

From 16 February 1849 he was substitute for the war minister of the Roman Republic. He participated in its defense against the French and was appointed major general on 30 June. After the fall of Rome Mezzacapo did not return to Naples but went into exile, first to Malta, and then Piedmont to where with his brother Carlo he created the "Military library for the use of Italian youth" and the " Rivista Militare" in 1856. While in Piedmont he married Malvina Saliceti, sister of Aurelio Saliceti.

== Second War of Independence ==
In 1859, during the Second Italian War of Independence, he entered the Piedmontese army where he was granted the rank of major general, and organized the "Mezzacapo Division" a division of volunteers from Romagna and the Marche, assisting Manfredo Fanti in the preparation of the annexation of Emilia and Romagna to the Kingdom of Sardinia. In 1860 he took part in the expedition of the Piedmontese regular army to the Kingdom of the Two Sicilies. In March 1861, taking the place of it:Ferdinando Augusto Pinelli, he commanded the siege and finally conquered the fortress of Civitella del Tronto, the last bastion of the Bourbon forces.

== Political career ==
He was appointed Senator of the Kingdom of Italy from 1 December 1870 and served as Minister of War of the Kingdom of Italy in the first and second Depretis governments (1876 - 1878). During his period of office he increased the number of territorial army commands to twelve and the divisional commands to twenty. The number of military districts was increased to 88 to support faster mobilisation. He also removed a number of senior army officers from their positions, which led to a great deal of trouble and recrimination. He also secured large numbers of modern rifles for the army, strengthened the cavalry by purchasing some eight thousand horses in just two months, and increased the strength of the Alpini units.

In 1879 he was given command of the army corps of Rome, a position he held until his death in 1885. He was twice invited to return to the position of Minister of War, but refused on both occasions as he did not believe that parliament would agree the military budgets he felt were necessary to press forward with the modernisation of Italy’s armed forces.

== Works ==
- Luigi Mezzacapo & Carlo Mezzacapo, Studi topografici e strategici su l'Italia. Milan: Vallardi, 1859
- Luigi Mezzacapo, Alcune considerazioni militari sul Piemonte, Turin: G. Cassone,1859
- Luigi Mezzacapo, La difesa dell'Italia dopo il trasferimento della capitale. Florence: Tip. Militare, 1865
- Luigi Mezzacapo, Relazione sulle banche-usure fuse con Scilla e Costa dell'amministratore giudiziario Luigi Mezzacapo. Naples: tip. di A. Cons., 1870
- Giovanni Nicotera & Luigi Mezzacapo, Istruzioni per il servizio di repressione del malandrinaggio in Sicilia . Rome: tip. Bencini, 1876
- Luigi Mezzacapo, Quid faciendum? . Rome: Tipografia Barbera, 1879
- Luigi Mezzacapo, Siamo pratici . Rome: Tipografia Barbera, 1879
- Luigi Mezzacapo, Grandi manovre (1880): Caratteri topografico-militari del terreno prescelto per le grandi manovre di corpi d'armata contrapposti. Rome. Tip. E. De Angelis, 1880
- Luigi Mezzacapo, Disposizioni di massima per l'esecuzione delle Grandi Manovre di corpi d'armata contrapposti (1880). Rome: Tip. E. De Angelis, 1880
- Luigi Mezzacapo, Armi e politica. Rome: F. Capaccini, 1881

== Honours ==
Grand Officer of the Order of Saints Maurice and Lazarus - ribbon for ordinary uniform

Grand Officer of the Order of Saints Maurice and Lazarus

Commander of the Military Order of Savoy - ribbon for ordinary uniform

Commander of the Military Order of Savoy
