= Cesare Bonelli =

Italian politician and general

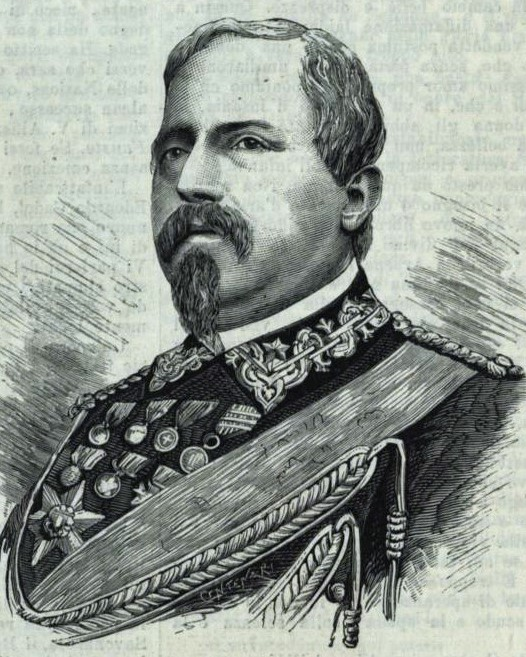

Minister of War
- In office 24 October 1878 – 19 December 1878
- Preceded by: Giovanni Bruzzo
- Succeeded by: Gustavo Mazè de la Roche
- In office 14 July 1879 – 13 July 1880
- Preceded by: Gustavo Mazè de la Roche
- Succeeded by: Ferdinando Acton

Minister of the Navy
- In office 14 July 1879 – 25 November 1879
- Preceded by: Niccolò Ferracciù
- Succeeded by: Ferdinando Acton

Senator
- In office 20 November 1879 – 1 October 1904

Cesare Amedeo Augusto Bonelli (3 January 1821 in Turin – 1 October 1904 in Orvieto) was an Italian politician and general, veteran of the Italian Wars of Independence. He was Senator of the Kingdom of Italy in the XIII legislature, and held the position of Minister of War in the first, second and third Cairoli government.

== Early life ==
He was born in Turin on 3 January 1821, son of the famous naturalist Franco Andrea Bonelli and Fernanda d'Ancona. Between 1830 and 1841 he attended the Accademia Reale di Torino, then completed his education at the Scuola di applicazione.

== Military career ==
Second lieutenant at the outbreak of the First Italian War of Independence, he obtained a silver medal for military valor for the courage shown during the battle of Goito (30 May 1848). Promoted to lieutenant he was assigned to service with the provisional government of Milan, subsequently participating in the short campaign of 1849.

Major at the outbreak of the Second Italian War of Independence he was assigned to the Field Artillery Regiment, assuming command of the artillery in the Emilian provinces from 31 January 1860. On the following 7 November he was promoted to lieutenant colonel, participating in the campaign in southern Italy where he distinguished himself during the sieges of the strongholds of Gaeta and Messina. During the siege of Gaeta he was seriously injured and was decorated with a second silver medal for military valor, while for his work during the siege of Messina he obtained the Knight's Cross of the Military Order of Savoy.

In 1862 he was promoted to colonel, assuming command of the 1st Artillery Regiment, moving the following year to command of the 6th. In 1866, at the outbreak of the Third Italian War of Independence he assumed command of the artillery of General Giacomo Durando's I Army Corps. During the battle of Custoza on 24 June he covered the retreat of the troops to Valeggio with his artillery, delaying the enemy's advance until a peremptory order from General Giuseppe Sirtori forced him to retreat to the right bank of the Mincio river. Appointed Officer of the Military Order of Savoy on 6 December 1866, in 1868 he was appointed major general, assuming command of the artillery of Milan, then moving on to Naples and finally Turin. Lieutenant general in 1877 he assumed command of the Territorial Division of Verona.

== Ministerial career ==
With the ministerial crisis following the Congress of Berlin, the President of the Council of Ministers Benedetto Cairoli invited him to replace General Giovanni Bruzzo as Minister of War. He retained this position in the subsequent Cairoli II and Cairoli III governments, also holding the role of Minister of the Navy in Cairoli II on an interim basis.

Appointed Senator of the Kingdom of Italy on 20 November 1879, He left the Ministry of War on 13 July 1880, his resignation prompted by parliamentary opposition to an increase in military spending he had requested by B. As minister, he was responsible above all for equipping Italian troops with the M1870 Italian Vetterli rifle, building field fortifications, and building the weapons factory in Terni.

He then returned to his previous role as commander of the territorial division of Verona. Between 1885 and 1889 he held the position of commander of the XI Army Corps of Bari, and was moved into an auxiliary role in November 1889. He died in Orvieto on 1 October 1904, and was later buried in the monumental area of the cemetery of Anagni, the city of his son-in-law, Lieutenant Colonel Enrico Sibilia.
