= Giovanni Bruzzo =

Italian politician and general

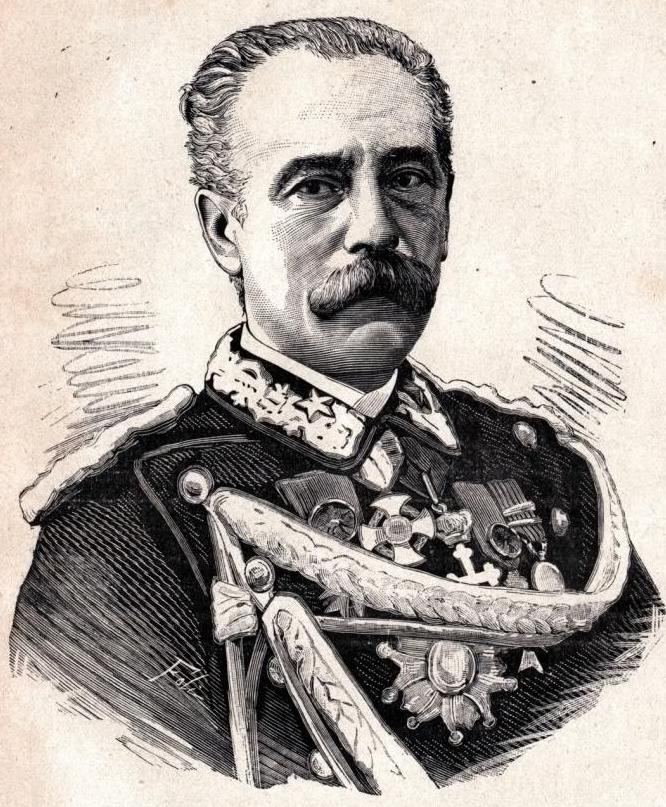

Minister of War
- In office 24 March 1878 – 24 October 1878
- Preceded by: Luigi Mezzacapo
- Succeeded by: Cesare Bonelli

Senator
- In office 4 April 1878 – 28 July 1900

Giovanni Bruzzo (15 August 1824 in Genoa – 28 July 1900 in Turin) was an Italian general and politician. He was a senator of the Kingdom of Italy from and Minister of War in the first Cairoli government.

== Early life and career ==
Born in Genoa to Lorenzo Bruzzo and Teresa Profumo, he entered the it: Accademia Reale di Torino in 1835, graduating in 1842 as a second lieutenant in the army of engineers. Promoted to captain in 1848, he took part in the campaign of 1849 during the First Italian War of Independence; he was then a teacher in the school of the artillery corps, and from 1854 to 1859 director of the military engineers of Cuneo. At the same time he directed the construction of a model military gunpowder factory in Fossano (1856). He was promoted major in 1859, lieutenant colonel in 1860 and colonel in 1861, subsequently in charge of the military engineers of Ancona and Bologna.

From 1863 to 1865 he was second in command and director of studies at the Military Academy of Turin, and in 1864 he was made a member of the Superior Council for military education and military education institutes. In October 1865 he moved to command the engineers of the IV Army Corps. In the operations of June-July 1866, at the head of the engineering departments of the corps under General Enrico Cialdini, Bruzzo distinguished himself in particular with the construction of a pontoon bridge over the River Po for heavy traffic and was promoted to major general in August 1866. He was then commander of the engineers of the army corps of Bologna, then of Verona and Naples. At the same time he took part in the discussion about the building of the system of fortifications to guard the new frontiers of the kingdom in Veneto. Promoted to lieutenant general in 1876, he was attached to the Artillery and Engineers Committee, then made commander of the Rome division.

== Ministerial and later career ==
In March 1878 Benedetto Cairoli chose four ministers from outside parliament, whose appointment would help him garner political support from the historical right under Quintino Sella. Among these was Bruzzo, appointed to the War Department on 24 March 1878 and immediately made senator. The government had a short and troubled life; at the end of October Bruzzo, who had already protested over the government's tolerance towards the republican unrest in Romagna, resigned, not sharing Cairoli's liberal attitude to public order.

Returning to active service, Bruzzo assumed command of the Piacenza division, then subsequently commanded the V, VI and I army corps, also assuming the position of superior director of fortifications in the territories dependent on the commands of the II, III and VII army corps. In 1881 he was a member of the commission charged by War Minister Emilio Ferrero with studying the fortifications on the northwest border. In 1892 he moved into an auxiliary position and on 28 July 1900 he died in Turin.

== Works ==
- Sulla Necessità di Procedere alla Difesa d'Italia, Naples 1870
- Considerazioni sulla Difesa Generale d'Italia, Florence 1870
- Considerazioni sulla Difesa Generale d'Italia con Modificazioni e Aggiunte, Naples 1871
- La Difesa dello Stato. Poche Osservazioni del Generale Bruzzo Bologna 1884
- Altre Osservazioni sulla Difesa dello Stato e Risposta alla "Rivista Militare Italiana", Bologna 1884

== Honours ==
Cavaliere di Gran Croce decorato di Gran Cordone dell'Ordine dei Santi Maurizio e Lazzaro - ribbon for ordinary uniform

Grand Cordon of the Order of Saints Maurice and Lazarus

Cavaliere di Gran Croce decorato di Gran Cordone dell'Ordine della Corona d'Italia - ribbon for ordinary uniform

Grand Cordon of the Order of the Crown of Italy

Gran Croce dell'Ordine di Carlo III (Spagna) - ribbon for ordinary uniform

Grand Cross of the Order of Charles III (Spain)

Grand'Ufficiale dell'Ordine della Legion d'Onore (Francia) - ribbon for ordinary uniform

Grand Officer of the Legion of Honour (France)

Ufficiale dell'Ordine di Leopoldo (Belgio) - ribbon for ordinary uniform

Officer of the Order of Leopold (Belgium)
