= Second Depretis government =

16th Government of Kingdom of Italy

Depretis II government
- 16th Cabinet of Italy

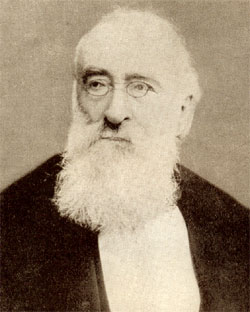
- Date formed: 26 December 1877
- Date dissolved: 24 March 1878

People and organisations
- Head of state: Victor Emmanuel II; Umberto I
- Head of government: Agostino Depretis
- Total no. of members: 10
- Member party: Historical Left

History
- Predecessor: Depretis I Cabinet
- Successor: Cairoli I Cabinet

The Depretis II government of Italy held office from 26 December 1877 until 24 March 1878, a total of 88 days, or 2 months and 26 days.

== Government parties ==
The government was composed by the following parties:

Party	Ideology	Leader
Historical Left	Liberalism	Agostino Depretis

== Composition ==
Office	Name	Party	Term
Prime Minister	Agostino Depretis	Historical Left	(1877–1878)
Minister of the Interior	Francesco Crispi	Historical Left	(1877–1878)
Minister of the Interior	Agostino Depretis	Historical Left	(1878–1878)
Minister of Foreign Affairs	Agostino Depretis	Historical Left	(1877–1878)
Minister of Grace and Justice	Pasquale Stanislao Mancini	Historical Left	(1877–1878)
Minister of Finance	Agostino Magliani	Historical Left	(1877–1878)
Minister of Treasury	Angelo Bargoni	Historical Left	(1877–1878)
Minister of War	Luigi Mezzacapo	Military	(1877–1878)
Minister of the Navy	Benedetto Brin	Military	(1877–1878)
Minister of Agriculture, Industry and Commerce	Salvatore Majorana Calatabiano	Historical Left	(1877–1878)
Minister of Public Works	Francesco Paolo Perez	Historical Left	(1877–1878)
Minister of Public Education	Michele Coppino	Historical Left	(1877–1878)
