= Gustavo Mazè de la Roche =

Italian general and politician

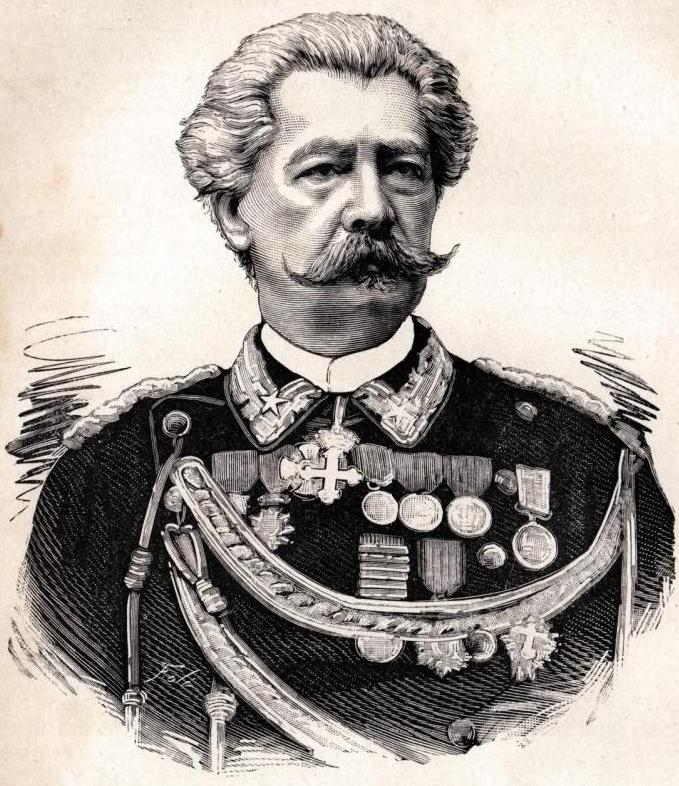

Minister of War
- In office 19 December 1878 – 14 July 1879
- Preceded by: Cesare Bonelli
- Succeeded by: Cesare Bonelli

Senator
- In office 22 December 1878 – 29 March 1886

Count Gustavo Mazè de la Roche (27 July 1824 in Turin – 29 March 1886 in Turin) was an Italian general and politician. He was a senator of the Kingdom of Italy and Minister of War in the third Depretis government.

== Early life and career to 1860 ==
Gustavo was the son of count Luigi Mazè de la Roche and Albertina Carignani di Chianoc. His family was long established in Turin, despite erroneous accounts that claimed they had only moved from Savoie and opted for Italian citizenship after the Treaty of Turin.

He underwent military training at the it:Accademia Reale di Torino from April 1834 to 1843, becoming a lieutenant in the infantry in 1847. During the First Italian War of Independence he fought under general Eusebio Bava in the 1st Army Corps, and was honourably mentioned for his part in the Battle of Goito where he earned his first silver Medal of Military Valor. Promoted to captain, he distinguished himself at the battle of Mortara where his horse was shot dead under him, he was wounded in the thigh by a musket ball and he was taken prisoner by the Austrians. After his release he was awarded a second silver Medal of Military Valor.

He took part in the Sardinian expeditionary corps in the Crimean War and was promoted to major in the first infantry regiment in 1856. During the Second Italian War of Independence he distinguished himself at the Battle of San Martino and was made a knight of the Military Order of Savoy.

== Military career 1860–1878 ==
In the 1860s Mazè de la Roche took part in the campaigns in the South against brigandage. In 1863 he was promoted to major general and made commander of the military subdivision of Foggia. Here he applied methods already tried out in Campobasso, arresting family members to secure information about outlaws, and carrying out summary executions. Under the draconian Pica Law the actions of the field commanders were supported by military tribunals. As Mazè de la Roche himself commented “in the district I am mayor, judge and commander of the carabinieri, exercising hear-total authority over fifteen communes including a provincial capital and its governor.” In 1866, now a major general, he commanded the Pinerolo Brigade during the Third Italian War of Independence.

In 1870 Mazè de la Roche played an important role in the capture of Rome. Now a lieutenant general he commanded the 12th division of the 4th Army Corps that surrounded and captured the town of Civita Castellana as they advanced through the Papal States On reaching Rome his division attacked the Porta Pia, forcing their way into the city and compelling the Papal troops to surrender.

== Ministerial and later career ==
In 1878, Mazè de la Roche was invited to serve as Minister of War in the third Depretis government and was appointed senator at the same time. The government fell only seven months later, whereupon he was made commander of the First Army Corps in Turin and dedicated himself to a study of how Italy's alpine borders could be defended.

He died on 29 March 1886 after he was thrown by a horse he was riding.

== Honours ==
Grand Officer of the Order of Saints Maurice and Lazarus - ribbon for ordinary uniform

Grand Officer of the Order of Saints Maurice and Lazarus

Grand Officer of the Order of the Crown of Italy - ribbon for ordinary uniform

Grand Officer of the Order of the Crown of Italy

2 silver Medals of Military Valor - ribbon for ordinary uniform

2 silver Medals of Military Valor

Knight of the Legion of Honour (France) - ribbon for ordinary uniform

Knight of the Legion of Honour (France)
