= Third Depretis government =

18th Government of Kingdom of Italy

Depretis III government
- 18th Cabinet of Italy

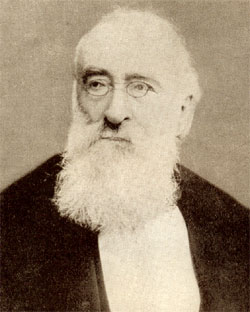
- Date formed: 19 December 1878
- Date dissolved: 14 July 1879

People and organisations
- Head of state: Umberto I
- Head of government: Agostino Depretis
- Total no. of members: 10
- Member party: Historical Left

History
- Predecessor: Cairoli I Cabinet
- Successor: Cairoli II Cabinet

The Depretis III government of Italy held office from 19 December 1878 until 14 July 1879, a total of 207 days, or 6 months and 25 days.

== Government parties ==
The government was composed by the following parties:

Party	Ideology	Leader
Historical Left	Liberalism	Agostino Depretis

== Composition ==
Office	Name	Party	Term
Prime Minister	Agostino Depretis	Historical Left	(1878–1879)
Minister of the Interior	Agostino Depretis	Historical Left	(1878–1879)
Minister of Foreign Affairs	Agostino Depretis	Historical Left	(1878–1879)
Minister of Grace and Justice	Diego Tajani	Historical Left	(1878–1879)
Minister of Finance	Agostino Magliani	Historical Left	(1878–1879)
Minister of Treasury	Agostino Magliani	Historical Left	(1878–1879)
Minister of War	Gustavo Mazè de la Roche	Military	(1878–1879)
Minister of the Navy	Niccolò Ferracciù	Historical Left	(1878–1879)
Minister of Agriculture, Industry and Commerce	Salvatore Majorana Calatabiano	Historical Left	(1878–1879)
Minister of Public Works	Raffaele Mezzanotte	Historical Left	(1878–1879)
Minister of Public Education	Michele Coppino	Historical Left	(1878–1879)
