= First Depretis government =

15th Government of Kingdom of Italy

Depretis I government
- 15th Cabinet of Italy

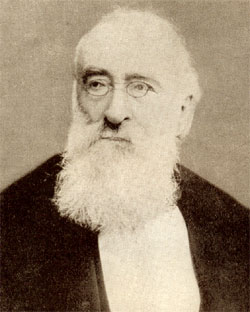
- Date formed: 25 March 1876
- Date dissolved: 25 December 1877

People and organisations
- Head of state: Victor Emmanuel II
- Head of government: Agostino Depretis
- Total no. of members: 9
- Member party: Historical Left

History
- Predecessor: Minghetti II Cabinet
- Successor: Depretis II Cabinet

The Depretis I government of Italy held office from 25 March 1876 until 25 December 1877, a total of 650 days (1 year and 9 months).

== Government parties ==
The government was composed by the following parties:

Party	Ideology	Leader
Historical Left	Liberalism	Agostino Depretis

== Composition ==
Office	Name	Party	Term
Prime Minister	Agostino Depretis	Historical Left	(1876–1877)
Minister of the Interior	Giovanni Nicotera	Historical Left	(1876–1877)
Minister of Foreign Affairs	Luigi Amedeo Melegari	Historical Left	(1876–1877)
Minister of Grace and Justice	Pasquale Stanislao Mancini	Historical Left	(1876–1877)
Minister of Finance	Agostino Depretis	Historical Left	(1876–1877)
Minister of War	Luigi Mezzacapo	Military	(1876–1877)
Minister of the Navy	Benedetto Brin	Military	(1876–1877)
Minister of Agriculture, Industry and Commerce	Salvatore Majorana Calatabiano	Historical Left	(1876–1877)
Minister of Public Works	Giuseppe Zanardelli	Historical Left	(1876–1877)
Minister of Public Works	Agostino Depretis	Historical Left	(1877–1877)
Minister of Public Education	Michele Coppino	Historical Left	(1876–1877)
