= Cesare Ricotti-Magnani =

Italian general

Cesare Francesco Ricotti-Magnani
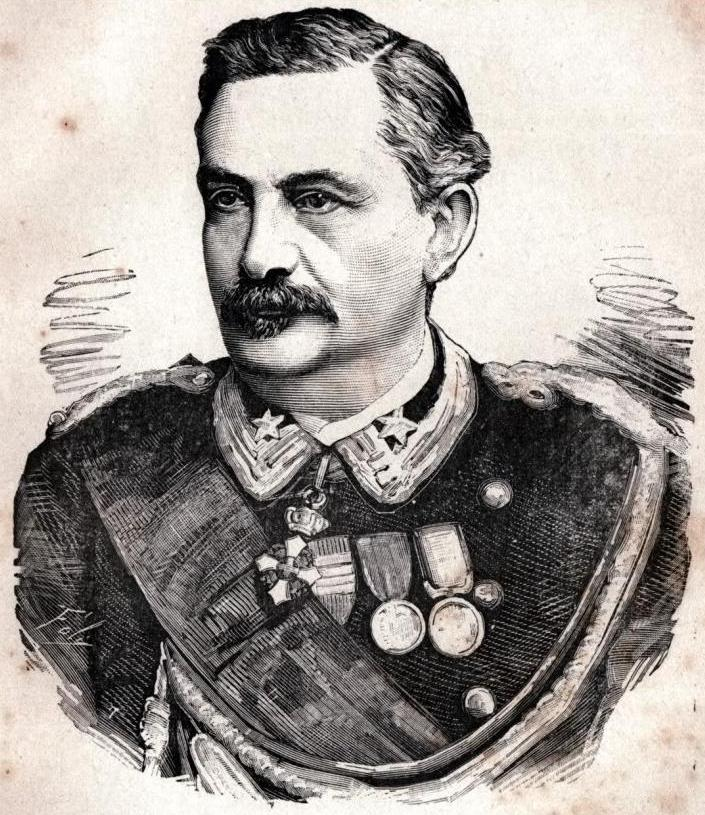
- Born: January 30, 1822
- Died: August 4, 1917 (aged 95)
- Military career
- Allegiance: Kingdom of Sardinia; Kingdom of Italy
- Branch: Sardinian Army; Regio Esercito
- Service years: 1840–1895
- Rank: Tenente Generale (Lieutenant General)

Cesare Francesco Ricotti Magnani (June 30, 1822 - August 4, 1917) was an Italian general who served as Minister of War of the Kingdom of Italy.

== Biography ==
He was born at Borgolavezzaro, near Novara.

As artillery lieutenant, he distinguished himself and was wounded at the Siege of Peschiera del Garda in 1848, and in 1852 gained further distinction by his efforts to prevent the explosion of a burning powder magazine. After serving from 1856 to 1859. as Director of the Artillery School, he became General of Division in 1864, commanding the 5th Division at the Battle of San Martino.

In the war of 1866 he stormed Borgoforte, to open a passage for Cialdini's army. Upon the death of General Govone in 1872 he was appointed Minister of War, and after the occupation of Rome bent all his efforts to army reform, in accordance with the lessons of the Franco-German War. He shortened the period of military service, extended conscription to all able-bodied men, created a permanent army, a mobile militia and a reserve, commenced the renewal of armaments, and placed Italy in a position to put 1,800,000 men on a war footing. He was also responsible, after the suggestion made by Captain Giuseppe Perrucchetti, for the foundation of the Alpini, the first established infantry corps specialized in mountain warfare, for the defense of Italy's mountainous borders.

Ricotti fell from power with the Right in 1876, but returned to office with Depretis in 1884, and amended his previous scheme of reform. Resigning in April 1887, he became a member of the senate in 1890, but took little part in public life until 1896, when, after the Battle of Adowa, he was entrusted by King Humbert with the formation of a cabinet.

Having constructed his ministry, he made over the premiership to the Marquis di Rudinì, retaining for himself the portfolio of war, and seeking to satisfy popular demands for the reduction of military expenditure by consolidating the tactical structure of the army without weakening its fighting power. Rudinì, however, finding that Ricotti's ideas, which he himself shared, were not acceptable at court, obliged him to resign office. His prestige as creator of the modern Italian army remained unimpaired, and his views on army consolidation enjoyed a large measure of technical and public favour.

== Orders and decorations ==
- Kingdom of Sardinia:
  - Commander of the Military Order of Savoy, 12 July 1859; Grand Cross, 6 January 1895
  - Maurician Medal to the Military Merit of Ten Lustrums, ca. 1890
  - Knight of the Supreme Order of the Most Holy Annunciation, 5 June 1892
  - Grand Cross of the Order of Saints Maurice and Lazarus, 1892
  - Grand Cross of the Order of the Crown of Italy, 1892
  - Silver Medal of Military Valor
  - Gold Military Cross with Crown (for 40 years of service)
- Spain: Grand Cross of the Order of Charles III, 28 January 1871
- Sweden-Norway: Commander Grand Cross of the Royal Order of the Sword, 18 December 1873
- (Austrian Empire) (Kingdom of Hungary) Austria-Hungary: Grand Cross of the Imperial Order of Leopold, 1875
