= Benedetto Cairoli =

Italian politician (1825–1889)

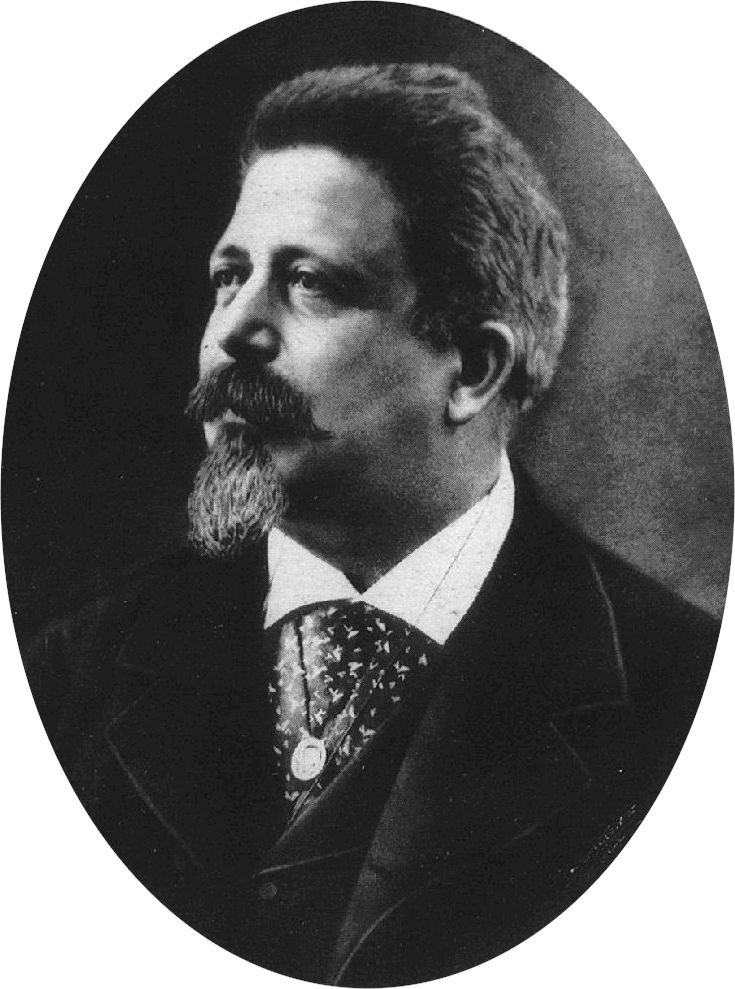

Prime Minister of Italy
- In office 14 July 1879 – 29 May 1881
- Monarch: Umberto I
- Preceded by: Agostino Depretis
- Succeeded by: Agostino Depretis
- In office 24 March 1878 – 19 December 1878
- Monarch: Umberto I
- Preceded by: Agostino Depretis
- Succeeded by: Agostino Depretis

President of the Italian Chamber of Deputies
- In office 7 March 1878 – 24 March 1878
- Preceded by: Francesco Crispi
- Succeeded by: Domenico Farini

Italian Minister of Foreign Affairs
- In office 25 November 1879 – 28 May 1881
- Prime Minister: Himself
- Preceded by: Agostino Depretis
- Succeeded by: Pasquale Mancini
- In office 24 October 1878 – 19 December 1878
- Prime Minister: Himself
- Preceded by: Luigi Corti
- Succeeded by: Agostino Depretis

Personal details
- Born: 28 January 1825 Pavia, Kingdom of Lombardy–Venetia
- Died: 8 August 1889 (aged 64) Naples, Kingdom of Italy
- Party: Historical Left
- Spouse: Trentino Elena Sizzo Noris

Benedetto Cairoli (28 January 1825 – 8 August 1889) was an Italian politician, who served as Prime Minister of Italy for two times.

== Biography ==
Cairoli was born at Pavia, Lombardy. From 1848 until the completion of Italian unity in 1870, his whole activity was devoted to the Risorgimento, as Garibaldian officer, political refugee, anti-Austrian conspirator and deputy to parliament. He commanded a volunteer company under Garibaldi in 1859 and 1860, being wounded slightly at Calatafimi and severely at Palermo in the latter year. In 1866, with the rank of colonel, he assisted Garibaldi in the campaign in the County of Tyrol, in 1867 fought at Mentana, and in 1870 conducted the negotiations with Bismarck, during which the German chancellor is alleged to have promised Italy possession of Rome and of her natural frontiers if the Democratic party could prevent an alliance between Victor Emmanuel and Napoleon.

The prestige personally acquired by Benedetto Cairoli was augmented by that of his four brothers, who fell during the wars of the Risorgimento, and by the heroic conduct of their mother. His refusal of all compensation or distinction further endeared him to the Italian people. When in 1876 the Left came into power, Cairoli, then a deputy of sixteen years' standing, became the parliamentary leader of his party.

== Prime Minister of Italy; 1st term ==
After the fall of Depretis, Nicotera and Crispi, formed his first cabinet in March 1878 with a Francophile and Irredentist policy.

After his marriage with the Countess Elena Sizeo of Trent, he permitted the Irredentist agitation to carry the country to the verge of a war with Austria. General irritation was caused by his and Count Corti's policy of clean hands at the Berlin Congress, where Italy obtained nothing, while Austria-Hungary secured a European mandate to occupy Bosnia and Herzegovina. A few months later the attempt of Giovanni Passannante to assassinate King Humbert at Naples (17 November 1878) caused his downfall, in spite of the courage displayed and the severe wound received by him in protecting the king's person on that occasion. Agostino Depretis became his successor (details here).

== Prime Minister of Italy; 2nd term ==
On 3 July 1879 Cairoli returned to power, and in the following November formed with Depretis a coalition ministry, in which he retained the premiership and the foreign office. Confidence in French assurances, and belief that Britain would never permit the extension of French influence in North Africa, prevented him from foreseeing the French occupation of Tunis (11 May 1881). In view of popular indignation he resigned in order to avoid making inopportune declarations to the chamber.

== Later life ==
Thenceforward he practically disappeared from political life. In 1887 he received the knighthood of the Annunziata, the highest Italian decoration, and on 8 August 1889 died while a guest of King Umberto in the royal palace of Capodimonte near Naples.

Cairoli was one of the most conspicuous representatives of that type of Italian public men who, having conspired and fought for a generation in the cause of national unity, were despite their valour little fitted for the responsible parliamentary and official positions they subsequently attained; and who by their ignorance of foreign affairs and of internal administration unwittingly impeded the political development of their country.

== Commemoration ==
The Italian Regia Marina (Royal Navy) destroyer Benedetto Cairoli was named for Cairoli.

The Regia Marina destroyer Francesco Nullo was renamed Fratelli Cairoli ("Cairoli Brothers") in 1921 in honor of Cairoli and his brothers collectively.

Political offices
Preceded by Francesco Crispi	President of the Italian Chamber of Deputies; 1878	Succeeded by Domenico Farini
Preceded by Agostino Depretis	Prime Minister of Italy; 1878	Succeeded by Agostino Depretis
Preceded by Luigi Corti	Italian Minister of Foreign Affairs; 1878	Succeeded by Agostino Depretis
Preceded by Agostino Depretis	Prime Minister of Italy; 1879–1881	Succeeded by Agostino Depretis
Preceded by Agostino Depretis	Italian Minister of Foreign Affairs; 1879–1881	Succeeded by Pasquale Mancini
