= Second Crispi government =

27th Government of Kingdom of Italy

Crispi II government
- 27th Cabinet of Italy

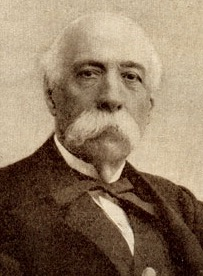
- Date formed: 9 March 1889
- Date dissolved: 6 February 1891

People and organisations
- Head of state: Umberto I
- Head of government: Francesco Crispi
- Total no. of members: 11
- Member party: Historical Left

History
- Predecessor: Crispi I Cabinet
- Successor: Di Rudinì I Cabinet

The Crispi II government of Italy held office from 9 March 1889 until 6 February 1891, a total of 699 days, or 1 year, 10 months and 28 days.

== Government parties ==
The government was composed by the following parties:

Party	Ideology	Leader
Historical Left	Liberalism	Francesco Crispi

== Composition ==
Office	Name	Party	Term
Prime Minister	Francesco Crispi	Historical Left	(1889–1891)
Minister of the Interior	Francesco Crispi	Historical Left	(1889–1891)
Minister of Foreign Affairs	Francesco Crispi	Historical Left	(1889–1891)
Minister of Grace and Justice	Giuseppe Zanardelli	Historical Left	(1889–1891)
Minister of Finance	Federico Seismit-Doda	Historical Left	(1889–1890)
Minister of Finance	Giovanni Giolitti	Historical Left	(1890–1890)
Minister of Finance	Bernardino Grimaldi	Historical Left	(1890–1891)
Minister of Treasury	Giovanni Giolitti	Historical Left	(1889–1890)
Minister of Treasury	Bernardino Grimaldi	Historical Left	(1890–1891)
Minister of War	Ettore Bertolè-Viale	Military	(1889–1891)
Minister of the Navy	Benedetto Brin	Military	(1889–1891)
Minister of Agriculture, Industry and Commerce	Luigi Miceli	Historical Left	(1889–1891)
Minister of Public Works	Gaspare Finali	Historical Left	(1889–1891)
Minister of Public Education	Paolo Boselli	Historical Right	(1889–1891)
Minister of Post and Telegraphs	Pietro Lacava	Historical Left	(1889–1891)
