= Sixth Depretis government =

23rd Government of Kingdom of Italy

Depretis VI government
- 23rd Cabinet of Italy

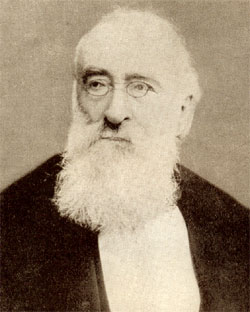
- Date formed: 30 March 1884
- Date dissolved: 29 June 1885

People and organisations
- Head of state: Umberto I
- Head of government: Agostino Depretis
- Total no. of members: 10
- Member party: Historical Left

History
- Predecessor: Depretis V Cabinet
- Successor: Depretis VII Cabinet

The Depretis VI government of Italy held office from 30 March 1884 until 29 June 1885, a total of 310 days, or 1 year, 2 months and 30 days.

== Government parties ==
The government was composed by the following parties:

Party	Ideology	Leader
Historical Left	Liberalism	Agostino Depretis

== Composition ==
Office	Name	Party	Term
Prime Minister	Agostino Depretis	Historical Left	(1884–1885)
Minister of the Interior	Agostino Depretis	Historical Left	(1884–1885)
Minister of Foreign Affairs	Pasquale Stanislao Mancini	Historical Left	(1884–1885)
Minister of Grace and Justice	Niccolò Ferracciù	Historical Left	(1884–1884)
Minister of Grace and Justice	Enrico Pessina	Historical Left	(1884–1885)
Minister of Finance	Agostino Magliani	Historical Left	(1884–1885)
Minister of Treasury	Agostino Magliani	Historical Left	(1884–1885)
Minister of War	Emilio Ferrero	Military	(1884–1884)
Minister of War	Cesare Ricotti-Magnani	Military	(1884–1885)
Minister of the Navy	Benedetto Brin	Military	(1884–1885)
Minister of Agriculture, Industry and Commerce	Bernardino Grimaldi	Historical Left	(1884–1885)
Minister of Public Works	Francesco Genala	Historical Left	(1884–1885)
Minister of Public Education	Michele Coppino	Historical Left	(1884–1885)
