= Fifth Depretis government =

22nd Government of Kingdom of Italy

Depretis V government
- 22nd Cabinet of Italy

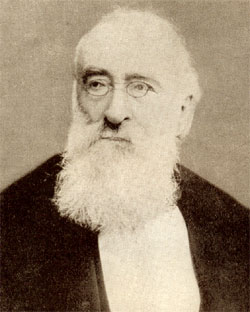
- Date formed: 25 May 1883
- Date dissolved: 30 March 1884

People and organisations
- Head of state: Umberto I
- Head of government: Agostino Depretis
- Total no. of members: 10
- Member party: Historical Left

History
- Predecessor: Depretis IV Cabinet
- Successor: Depretis VI Cabinet

The Depretis V government of Italy held office from 25 May 1883 until 30 March 1884, a total of 310 days, or 10 months and 5 days.

== Government parties ==
The government was composed by the following parties:

Party	Ideology	Leader
Historical Left	Liberalism	Agostino Depretis

== Composition ==
Office	Name	Party	Term
Prime Minister	Agostino Depretis	Historical Left	(1883–1884)
Minister of the Interior	Agostino Depretis	Historical Left	(1883–1884)
Minister of Foreign Affairs	Pasquale Stanislao Mancini	Historical Left	(1883–1884)
Minister of Grace and Justice	Fernardino Giannuzzi Savelli	Historical Left	(1883–1884)
Minister of Finance	Agostino Magliani	Historical Left	(1883–1884)
Minister of Treasury	Agostino Magliani	Historical Left	(1883–1884)
Minister of War	Emilio Ferrero	Military	(1883–1884)
Minister of the Navy	Ferdinando Acton	Military	(1883–1883)
Minister of the Navy	Andrea Del Santo	Military	(1883–1884)
Minister of Agriculture, Industry and Commerce	Domenico Berti	Historical Left	(1883–1884)
Minister of Public Works	Francesco Genala	Historical Left	(1883–1884)
Minister of Public Education	Guido Baccelli	Historical Left	(1883–1884)
