= First Crispi government =

26th Government of Kingdom of Italy

Crispi I government
- 26th Cabinet of Italy

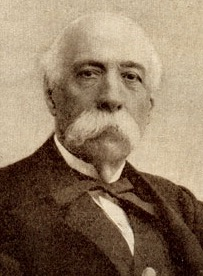
- Date formed: 29 July 1887
- Date dissolved: 9 March 1889

People and organisations
- Head of state: Umberto I
- Head of government: Francesco Crispi
- Total no. of members: 10
- Member party: Historical Left

History
- Predecessor: Depretis VIII Cabinet
- Successor: Crispi II Cabinet

The Crispi I government of Italy held office from 29 July 1887 until 9 March 1889, a total of 589 days, or 1 year, 7 months and 8 days.

== Government parties ==
The government was composed by the following parties:

| Party | Ideology | Leader |
|---|---|---|
| Historical Left | Liberalism | Francesco Crispi |

== Composition ==
| Office | Name | Party | Term |
|---|---|---|---|
| Prime Minister | Francesco Crispi | Historical Left | (1887–1889) |
| Minister of the Interior | Francesco Crispi | Historical Left | (1887–1889) |
| Minister of Foreign Affairs | Francesco Crispi | Historical Left | (1887–1889) |
| Minister of Grace and Justice | Giuseppe Zanardelli | Historical Left | (1887–1889) |
| Minister of Finance | Bernardino Grimaldi | Historical Left | (1887–1888) |
| Minister of Finance | Luigi Miceli | Historical Left | (1888–1889) |
| Minister of Treasury | Agostino Magliani | Historical Left | (1887–1888) |
| Minister of Treasury | Costantino Perazzi | Historical Left | (1888–1889) |
| Minister of War | Ettore Bertolè-Viale | Military | (1887–1889) |
| Minister of the Navy | Benedetto Brin | Military | (1887–1889) |
| Minister of Agriculture, Industry and Commerce | Luigi Miceli | Historical Left | (1887–1889) |
| Minister of Public Works | Giuseppe Saracco | Historical Left | (1887–1889) |
| Minister of Public Education | Michele Coppino | Historical Left | (1887–1888) |
| Minister of Public Education | Paolo Boselli | Historical Right | (1888–1889) |
