= Fourth Depretis government =

21st Government of Kingdom of Italy

Depretis IV government
- 21st Cabinet of Italy

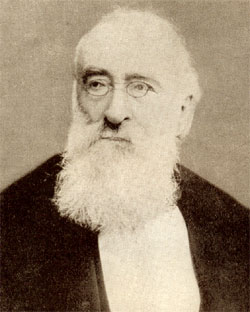
- Date formed: 29 May 1881
- Date dissolved: 25 May 1883

People and organisations
- Head of state: Umberto I
- Head of government: Agostino Depretis
- Total no. of members: 10
- Member party: Historical Left

History
- Predecessor: Cairoli III Cabinet
- Successor: Depretis V Cabinet

The Depretis IV government of Italy held office from 29 May 1881 until 25 May 1883, a total of 726 days, or 1 year, 11 months and 26 days.

== Government parties ==
The government was composed by the following parties:

Party	Ideology	Leader
Historical Left	Liberalism	Agostino Depretis

== Composition ==
Office	Name	Party	Term
Prime Minister	Agostino Depretis	Historical Left	(1881–1883)
Minister of the Interior	Agostino Depretis	Historical Left	(1881–1883)
Minister of Foreign Affairs	Pasquale Stanislao Mancini	Historical Left	(1881–1883)
Minister of Grace and Justice	Giuseppe Zanardelli	Historical Left	(1881–1883)
Minister of Finance	Agostino Magliani	Historical Left	(1881–1883)
Minister of Treasury	Agostino Magliani	Historical Left	(1881–1883)
Minister of War	Emilio Ferrero	Military	(1881–1883)
Minister of the Navy	Ferdinando Acton	Military	(1881–1883)
Minister of Agriculture, Industry and Commerce	Domenico Berti	Historical Left	(1881–1883)
Minister of Public Works	Alfredo Baccarini	Historical Left	(1881–1883)
Minister of Public Education	Guido Baccelli	Historical Left	(1881–1883)
