= Seventh Depretis government =

24th Government of Kingdom of Italy

Depretis VII government
- 24th Cabinet of Italy

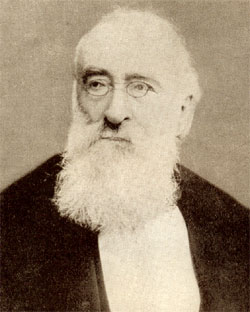
- Date formed: 29 June 1885
- Date dissolved: 4 April 1887

People and organisations
- Head of state: Umberto I
- Head of government: Agostino Depretis
- Total no. of members: 10
- Member party: Historical Left

History
- Predecessor: Depretis VI Cabinet
- Successor: Depretis VIII Cabinet

The Depretis VII government of Italy held office from 29 June 1885 until 4 April 1887, a total of 644 days, or 1 year, 9 months and 6 days.

== Government parties ==
The government was composed by the following parties:

Party	Ideology	Leader
Historical Left	Liberalism	Agostino Depretis

== Composition ==
Office	Name	Party	Term
Prime Minister	Agostino Depretis	Historical Left	(1885–1887)
Minister of the Interior	Agostino Depretis	Historical Left	(1885–1887)
Minister of Foreign Affairs	Agostino Depretis	Historical Left	(1885–1885)
Minister of Foreign Affairs	Carlo Felice Nicolis di Robilant	Military	(1885–1887)
Minister of Grace and Justice	Diego Tajani	Historical Left	(1885–1887)
Minister of Finance	Agostino Magliani	Historical Left	(1885–1887)
Minister of Treasury	Agostino Magliani	Historical Left	(1885–1887)
Minister of War	Cesare Ricotti-Magnani	Military	(1885–1887)
Minister of the Navy	Benedetto Brin	Military	(1885–1887)
Minister of Agriculture, Industry and Commerce	Bernardino Grimaldi	Historical Left	(1885–1887)
Minister of Public Works	Francesco Genala	Historical Left	(1885–1887)
Minister of Public Education	Michele Coppino	Historical Left	(1885–1887)
