= Eighth Depretis government =

25th Government of Kingdom of Italy

Depretis VIII government
- 25th Cabinet of Italy

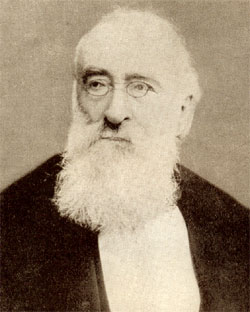
- Date formed: 4 April 1887
- Date dissolved: 29 July 1887

People and organisations
- Head of state: Umberto I
- Head of government: Agostino Depretis
- Total no. of members: 10
- Member party: Historical Left

History
- Predecessor: Depretis VII Cabinet
- Successor: Crispi I Cabinet

The Depretis VIII government of Italy held office from 4 April 1887 until 29 July 1887, a total of 116 days, or 3 months and 25 days.

== Government parties ==
The government was composed by the following parties:

Party	Ideology	Leader
Historical Left	Liberalism	Agostino Depretis

== Composition ==
Office	Name	Party	Term
Prime Minister	Agostino Depretis	Historical Left	(1887–1887)
Minister of the Interior	Francesco Crispi	Historical Left	(1887–1887)
Minister of Foreign Affairs	Agostino Depretis	Historical Left	(1887–1887)
Minister of Grace and Justice	Giuseppe Zanardelli	Historical Left	(1887–1887)
Minister of Finance	Bernardino Grimaldi	Historical Left	(1887–1887)
Minister of Treasury	Agostino Magliani	Historical Left	(1887–1887)
Minister of War	Ettore Bertolè-Viale	Military	(1887–1887)
Minister of the Navy	Benedetto Brin	Military	(1887–1887)
Minister of Agriculture, Industry and Commerce	Luigi Miceli	Historical Left	(1887–1887)
Minister of Public Works	Giuseppe Saracco	Historical Left	(1887–1887)
Minister of Public Education	Michele Coppino	Historical Left	(1887–1887)
