= Minister of Finance (Italy) =

Ministry in the Cabinet of Italy

This is a list of Italian ministers of finance, from 1861 to present.

== List of ministers of finance ==
=== Kingdom of Italy (1861–1946) ===
Parties

- 1861–1912:
  - Historical Right
  - Historical Left
- 1914–1922:
  - Liberal Union
  - Italian Catholic Electoral Union
  - Democratic Liberal Party
  - Italian People's Party
  - Independent
- 1922–1943:
  - National Fascist Party
- 1943–1946:
  - Italian Liberal Party
  - Action Party
  - Italian Communist Party
  - Independent

Coalitions

- 1861–1912:
  - Rightist coalition
  - Leftist coalition
  - Mixed coalition
- 1912–1922:
  - Liberal coalition
- 1922–1943:
  - Fascist
- 1943–1946:
  - Mixed coalition

N.	Portrait	Name (Born–Died)	Term of office			Party	Government	Ref.
N.	Portrait	Name (Born–Died)	Took office	Left office	Time in office	Party	Government	Ref.
Minister of Finance
1		Pietro Bastogi (1808–1899)	23 March 1861	3 March 1862	345 days	Historical Right	Cavour IV; Ricasoli I	
2		Quintino Sella (1827–1884)	3 March 1862	8 December 1862	280 days	Historical Right	Rattazzi I	
3		Marco Minghetti (1818–1886)	8 December 1862	28 September 1864	1 year, 295 days	Historical Right	Farini; Minghetti I	
(2)		Quintino Sella (1827–1884)	28 September 1864	31 December 1865	1 year, 110 days	Historical Right	La Marmora II	
4		Antonio Scialoja (1817–1877)	31 December 1865	17 February 1867	1 year, 48 days	Historical Right	La Marmora III	
4		Antonio Scialoja (1817–1877)	31 December 1865	17 February 1867	1 year, 48 days	Historical Right	Ricasoli II	
5		Agostino Depretis (1813–1887)	17 February 1867	10 April 1867	52 days	Historical Left	Ricasoli II	
6		Francesco Ferrara (1810–1900)	10 April 1867	27 October 1867	200 days	Historical Left	Rattazzi II	
7		Luigi Guglielmo Cambray-Digny (1820–1906)	27 October 1867	14 December 1869	2 years, 48 days	Historical Right	Menabrea I·II·III	
(2)		Quintino Sella (1827–1884)	14 December 1869	10 July 1873	4 years, 208 days	Historical Right	Lanza	
(3)		Marco Minghetti (1818–1886); As Prime Minister	10 July 1873	25 March 1876	2 years, 259 days	Historical Right	Minghetti II	
(5)		Agostino Depretis (1813–1887); As Prime Minister	25 March 1876	25 December 1877	1 year, 275 days	Historical Left	Depretis I	
8		Agostino Magliani (1824–1891)	25 December 1877	24 March 1878	89 days	Historical Left	Depretis II	
9		Federico Seismit-Doda (1825–1893)	24 March 1878	19 December 1878	270 days	Historical Left	Cairoli I	
(8)		Agostino Magliani (1824–1891)	19 December 1878	14 July 1879	207 days	Historical Left	Depretis III	
10		Bernardino Grimaldi (1839–1897)	14 July 1879	25 November 1879	134 days	Historical Left	Cairoli II	
(8)		Agostino Magliani (1824–1891)	25 November 1879	4 April 1887	7 years, 130 days	Historical Left	Cairoli III; Depretis IV·V· VI·VII	
(10)		Bernardino Grimaldi (1839–1897)	4 April 1887	29 December 1888	1 year, 269 days	Historical Left	Depretis VIII; Crispi I	
11		Francesco Crispi (1819–1901); As Prime Minister	29 December 1888	9 March 1889	70 days	Historical Left	Crispi I	
(9)		Federico Seismit-Doda (1825–1893)	9 March 1889	14 September 1890	1 year, 189 days	Historical Left	Crispi II	
12		Giovanni Giolitti (1842–1928)	14 September 1890	10 December 1890	87 days	Historical Left	Crispi II	
(10)		Bernardino Grimaldi (1839–1897)	10 December 1890	6 February 1891	58 days	Historical Left	Crispi II	
13		Giuseppe Colombo (1836–1921)	6 February 1891	4 May 1892	1 year, 88 days	Historical Right	Di Rudinì I	
14		Vittorio Ellena (1844–1892)	15 May 1892	7 July 1892†	53 days	Historical Left	Giolitti I	
(10)		Bernardino Grimaldi (1839–1897)	17 July 1892	24 May 1893	311 days	Historical Left	Giolitti I	
15		Lazzaro Gagliardo (1835–1899)	24 May 1893	15 December 1893	205 days	Historical Left	Giolitti I	
16		Sidney Sonnino (1847–1922)	15 December 1893	14 June 1894	181 days	Historical Right	Crispi III	
17		Paolo Boselli (1838–1932)	14 June 1894	10 March 1896	1 year, 270 days	Historical Right	Crispi IV	
18		Ascanio Branca (1840–1903)	10 March 1896	29 June 1898	2 years, 111 days	Historical Right	Di Rudinì II·III·IV·V	
19		Paolo Carcano (1843–1918)	29 June 1898	14 May 1899	319 days	Historical Left	Pelloux I	
20		Pietro Carmine (1841–1913)	14 May 1899	24 June 1900	1 year, 41 days	Historical Right	Pelloux II	
21		Bruno Chimirri (1842–1917)	24 June 1900	15 February 1901	236 days	Historical Right	Saracco	
22		Leone Wollemborg (1859–1932)	15 February 1901	3 August 1901	169 days	Historical Left	Zanardelli	
(19)		Paolo Carcano (1843–1918)	3 August 1901	3 November 1903	2 years, 92 days	Historical Left	Zanardelli	
23		Pietro Rosano (1846–1903)	3 November 1903	9 November 1903†	6 days	Historical Left	Giolitti II	
24		Angelo Majorana (1865–1910)	29 November 1904	24 December 1905	1 year, 25 days	Historical Left	Giolitti II	
24		Angelo Majorana (1865–1910)	29 November 1904	24 December 1905	1 year, 25 days	Historical Left	Tittoni	
24		Angelo Majorana (1865–1910)	29 November 1904	24 December 1905	1 year, 25 days	Historical Left	Fortis I	
25		Pietro Vacchelli (1837–1913)	24 December 1905	8 February 1906	46 days	Historical Left	Fortis II	
26		Antonio Salandra (1853–1931)	8 February 1906	29 May 1906	110 days	Historical Right	Sonnino I	
27		Fausto Massimini (1859–1908)	29 May 1906	24 March 1907	299 days	Historical Left	Giolitti III	
(24)		Angelo Majorana (1865–1910)	24 March 1907	19 April 1907	26 days	Historical Left	Giolitti III	
28		Pietro Lacava (1835–1912)	19 April 1907	10 December 1909	2 years, 235 days	Historical Left	Giolitti III	
29		Enrico Arlotta (1851–1933)	11 December 1909	31 March 1910	110 days	Historical Right	Sonnino II	
30		Luigi Facta (1861–1930)	31 March 1910	21 March 1914	3 years, 355 days	Historical Right / Liberal Union	Luzzatti	
30		Luigi Facta (1861–1930)	31 March 1910	21 March 1914	3 years, 355 days	Historical Right / Liberal Union	Giolitti IV	
31		Luigi Rava (1860–1938)	21 March 1914	31 October 1914	224 days	Liberal Union	Salandra I	
32		Edoardo Daneo (1851–1922)	31 October 1914	18 June 1916	1 year, 231 days	Liberal Union	Salandra I·II	
33		Filippo Meda (1869–1939)	18 June 1916	23 June 1919	3 years, 5 days	Italian Catholic Electoral Union	Boselli; Orlando	
34		Francesco Tedesco (1853–1921)	23 June 1919	14 March 1920	265 days	Liberal Union	Nitti I	
35		Carlo Schanzer (1865–1953)	14 March 1920	21 May 1920	68 days	Democratic Liberal Party	Nitti I	
36		Giuseppe De Nava (1858–1924)	21 May 1920	15 June 1920	25 days	Liberal Union	Nitti II	
(34)		Francesco Tedesco (1853–1921)	15 June 1920	10 August 1920	56 days	Liberal Union|	Giolitti V	
(30)		Luigi Facta (1861–1930)	10 August 1920	4 July 1921	328 days	Liberal Union	Giolitti V	
37		Marcello Soleri (1882–1945)	4 July 1921	26 February 1922	237 days	Liberal Union / Italian Liberal Party	Bonomi I	
38		Giovanni Battista Bertone (1874–1969)	26 February 1922	31 October 1922	247 days	Italian People's Party	Facta I	
Minister of Treasury and Finance
39		Alberto De Stefani (1879–1969)	31 October 1922	10 July 1925	2 years, 252 days	National Fascist Party	Mussolini	
40		Giuseppe Volpi (1877–1947)	10 July 1925	9 July 1928	2 years, 365 days	National Fascist Party	Mussolini	
41		Antonio Mosconi (1866–1955)	9 July 1928	20 July 1932	4 years, 11 days	National Fascist Party	Mussolini	
42		Guido Jung (1876–1949)	20 July 1932	17 January 1935	2 years, 181 days	National Fascist Party	Mussolini	
43		Paolo Thaon di Revel (1888–1973)	17 January 1935	6 February 1943	8 years, 20 days	National Fascist Party	Mussolini	
44		Giacomo Acerbo (1888–1969)	6 February 1943	25 July 1943	169 days	National Fascist Party	Mussolini	
45		Domenico Bartolini (1880–1960)	25 July 1943	11 February 1944	201 days	Independent	Badoglio I	
(42)		Guido Jung (1876–1949)	11 February 1944	17 April 1944	66 days	Independent	Badoglio II	
46		Quinto Quintieri (1894–1968)	22 April 1944	8 June 1944	47 days	Italian Liberal Party	Badoglio II	
Minister of Finance
47		Stefano Siglienti (1898–1971)	18 June 1944	10 December 1944	175 days	Action Party	Bonomi II	
48		Antonio Pesenti (1910–1973)	10 December 1944	21 June 1945	193 days	Italian Communist Party	Bonomi III	
49		Mauro Scoccimarro (1895–1972)	21 June 1945	13 July 1946	1 year, 22 days	Italian Communist Party	Parri; De Gasperi I	

=== Italian Republic (1946–present) ===
Parties

- 1946–1994:
  - Italian Communist Party
  - Christian Democracy
  - Italian Liberal Party
  - Italian Democratic Socialist Party
  - Italian Republican Party
  - Italian Socialist Party
  - Independent
- 1994–present:
  - Democratic Party of the Left / Democrats of the Left
  - Forza Italia / The People of Freedom
  - Italian Democratic Socialists
  - Democratic Party
  - Independent

Governments

- 1946–1994:
  - Centrist coalition
  - Organic centre-left
  - Pentapartito / Quadripartito
  - Mixed coalition
- 1994–present:
  - Centre-right coalition
  - Centre-left coalition
  - Mixed coalition

N.	Portrait	Name (Born–Died)	Term of office			Party	Government	Ref.
N.	Portrait	Name (Born–Died)	Took office	Left office	Time in office	Party	Government	Ref.
Minister of Finance
1		Mauro Scoccimarro (1895–1972)	13 July 1946	2 February 1947	204 days	Italian Communist Party	De Gasperi II	
2		Pietro Campilli (1891–1974)	2 February 1947	31 May 1947	118 days	Christian Democracy	De Gasperi III	
3		Luigi Einaudi (1874–1961)	31 May 1947	6 June 1947	204 days	Italian Liberal Party	De Gasperi IV	
4		Giuseppe Pella (1902–1981)	6 June 1947	23 May 1948	352 days	Christian Democracy	De Gasperi IV	
5		Ezio Vanoni (1903–1956)	23 May 1948	17 August 1953	5 years, 86 days	Christian Democracy	De Gasperi V·VI·VII·VIII; Pella	
6		Adone Zoli (1887–1960)	18 January 1954	10 February 1954	23 days	Christian Democracy	Fanfani I	
7		Roberto Tremelloni (1900–1987)	10 February 1954	6 July 1955	1 year, 146 days	Italian Democratic Socialist Party	Scelba	
8		Giulio Andreotti (1919–2013)	6 July 1955	1 July 1958	2 years, 360 days	Christian Democracy	Segni I Zoli	
9		Luigi Preti (1914–2009)	1 July 1958	16 February 1959	230 days	Italian Democratic Socialist Party	Fanfani II	
10		Paolo Emilio Taviani (1912–2001)	16 February 1959	25 March 1960	1 year, 38 days	Christian Democracy	Segni II	
11		Giuseppe Trabucchi (1904–1975)	25 March 1960	21 June 1963	3 years, 88 days	Christian Democracy	Tambroni; Fanfani III·IV	
12		Mario Martinelli (1906–2001)	21 June 1963	4 December 1963	166 days	Christian Democracy	Leone I	
13		Roberto Tremelloni (1900–1987)	4 December 1963	23 February 1966	2 years, 81 days	Italian Democratic Socialist Party	Moro I·II	
(9)		Luigi Preti (1914–2009)	23 February 1966	24 June 1968	2 years, 122 days	Italian Democratic Socialist Party	Moro III	
14		Mario Ferrari Aggradi (1916–1997)	24 June 1968	12 December 1968	171 days	Christian Democracy	Leone II	
15		Oronzo Reale (1902–1988)	12 December 1968	5 August 1969	236 days	Italian Republican Party	Rumor I	
16		Giacinto Bosco (1905–1997)	5 August 1969	23 March 1970	230 days	Christian Democracy	Rumor II	
(9)		Luigi Preti (1914–2009)	27 March 1970	17 February 1972	1 year, 327 days	Italian Democratic Socialist Party	Rumor III; Colombo	
(4)		Giuseppe Pella (1902–1981)	17 February 1972	26 June 1972	130 days	Christian Democracy	Andreotti I	
17		Athos Valsecchi (1919–1985)	26 June 1972	7 July 1973	1 year, 11 days	Christian Democracy	Andreotti II	
18		Emilio Colombo (1920–2013)	7 July 1973	14 March 1974	250 days	Christian Democracy	Rumor IV	
19		Mario Tanassi (1916–2007)	14 March 1974	23 November 1974	254 days	Italian Democratic Socialist Party	Rumor V	
20		Bruno Visentini (1914–1995)	23 November 1974	12 February 1976	1 year, 81 days	Italian Republican Party	Moro IV	
21		Gaetano Stammati (1908–2002)	12 February 1976	29 July 1976	168 days	Christian Democracy	Moro V	
22		Filippo Maria Pandolfi (1927–2025)	29 July 1976	11 March 1978	1 year, 225 days	Christian Democracy	Andreotti III	
23		Franco Maria Malfatti (1927–1991)	11 March 1978	4 August 1979	1 year, 146 days	Christian Democracy	Andreotti IV·V	
24		Franco Reviglio (1935–2025)	4 August 1979	28 June 1981	1 year, 328 days	Italian Socialist Party	Cossiga I	
24		Franco Reviglio (1935–2025)	4 August 1979	28 June 1981	1 year, 328 days	Italian Socialist Party	Cossiga II; Forlani	
25		Rino Formica (1927–)	28 June 1981	1 December 1982	1 year, 156 days	Italian Socialist Party	Spadolini I·II	
26		Francesco Forte (1929–2022)	1 December 1982	4 August 1983	246 days	Italian Socialist Party	Fanfani V	
(20)		Bruno Visentini (1914–1995)	4 August 1983	18 April 1987	3 years, 257 days	Italian Republican Party	Craxi I·II	
27		Giuseppe Guarino (1922–2020)	18 April 1987	29 July 1987	102 days	Christian Democracy	Fanfani VI	
28		Antonio Gava (1930–2008)	29 July 1987	13 April 1988	259 days	Christian Democracy	Goria	
29		Emilio Colombo (1920–2013)	13 April 1988	22 July 1989	1 year, 100 days	Christian Democracy	De Mita	
(25)		Rino Formica (1927–)	22 July 1989	28 June 1992	2 years, 342 days	Italian Socialist Party	Andreotti VI·VII	
30		Giovanni Goria (1943–1994)	28 June 1992	21 February 1993	238 days	Christian Democracy	Amato I	
31		Franco Reviglio (1935–2025)	21 February 1993	31 March 1993	38 days	Italian Socialist Party	Amato I	
32		Giuliano Amato (1938–); As Prime Minister	31 March 1993	28 April 1993	28 days	Italian Socialist Party	Amato I	
33		Vincenzo Visco (1942–)	28 April 1993	4 May 1993	6 days	Democratic Party of the Left	Ciampi	
34		Franco Gallo (1937–)	4 May 1993	10 May 1994	1 year, 6 days	Independent	Ciampi	
35		Giulio Tremonti (1947–)	10 May 1994	17 January 1995	252 days	Liberal Democratic Foundation / Forza Italia	Berlusconi I	
36		Augusto Fantozzi (1940–2019)	17 January 1995	17 May 1996	1 year, 121 days	Independent	Dini	
(33)		Vincenzo Visco (1942–)	17 May 1996	25 April 2000	3 years, 344 days	Democratic Party of the Left / Democrats of the Left	Prodi I D'Alema I·II	
37		Ottaviano Del Turco (1944–2024)	25 April 2000	10 June 2001	1 year, 46 days	Italian Democratic Socialists	Amato II	
Minister of Economy and Finance
(35)		Giulio Tremonti (1947–)	11 June 2001	3 July 2004	3 years, 22 days	Forza Italia	Berlusconi II	
38		Domenico Siniscalco (1957–)	16 July 2004	22 September 2005	1 year, 68 days	Independent	Berlusconi II·III	
(35)		Giulio Tremonti (1947–)	22 September 2005	8 May 2006	228 days	Forza Italia	Berlusconi iII	
39		Tommaso Padoa-Schioppa (1940–2010)	17 May 2006	8 May 2008	1 year, 357 days	Independent	Prodi II	
(35)		Giulio Tremonti (1947–)	8 May 2008	16 November 2011	3 years, 192 days	The People of Freedom	Berlusconi IV	
40		Mario Monti (1943–); As Prime Minister	16 November 2011	11 July 2012	238 days	Independent	Monti	
41		Vittorio Grilli (1957–)	11 July 2012	28 April 2013	291 days	Independent	Monti	
42		Fabrizio Saccomanni (1942–2019)	28 April 2013	24 February 2014	302 days	Independent	Letta	
43		Pier Carlo Padoan (1950–)	24 February 2014	1 June 2018	4 years, 97 days	Independent / Democratic Party	Renzi; Gentiloni	
44		Giovanni Tria (1948– )	1 June 2018	5 September 2019	1 year, 96 days	Independent	Conte I	
45		Roberto Gualtieri (1966–)	5 September 2019	13 February 2021	1 year, 161 days	Democratic Party	Conte II	
46		Daniele Franco (1953– )	13 February 2021	22 October 2022	1 year, 251 days	Independent	Draghi	
47		Giancarlo Giorgetti (1966– )	22 October 2022	Incumbent	3 years, 79 days	League	Meloni	
