= Sixth Fanfani government =

44th government of the Italian Republic

Fanfani VI Cabinet
- 44th Cabinet of Italy

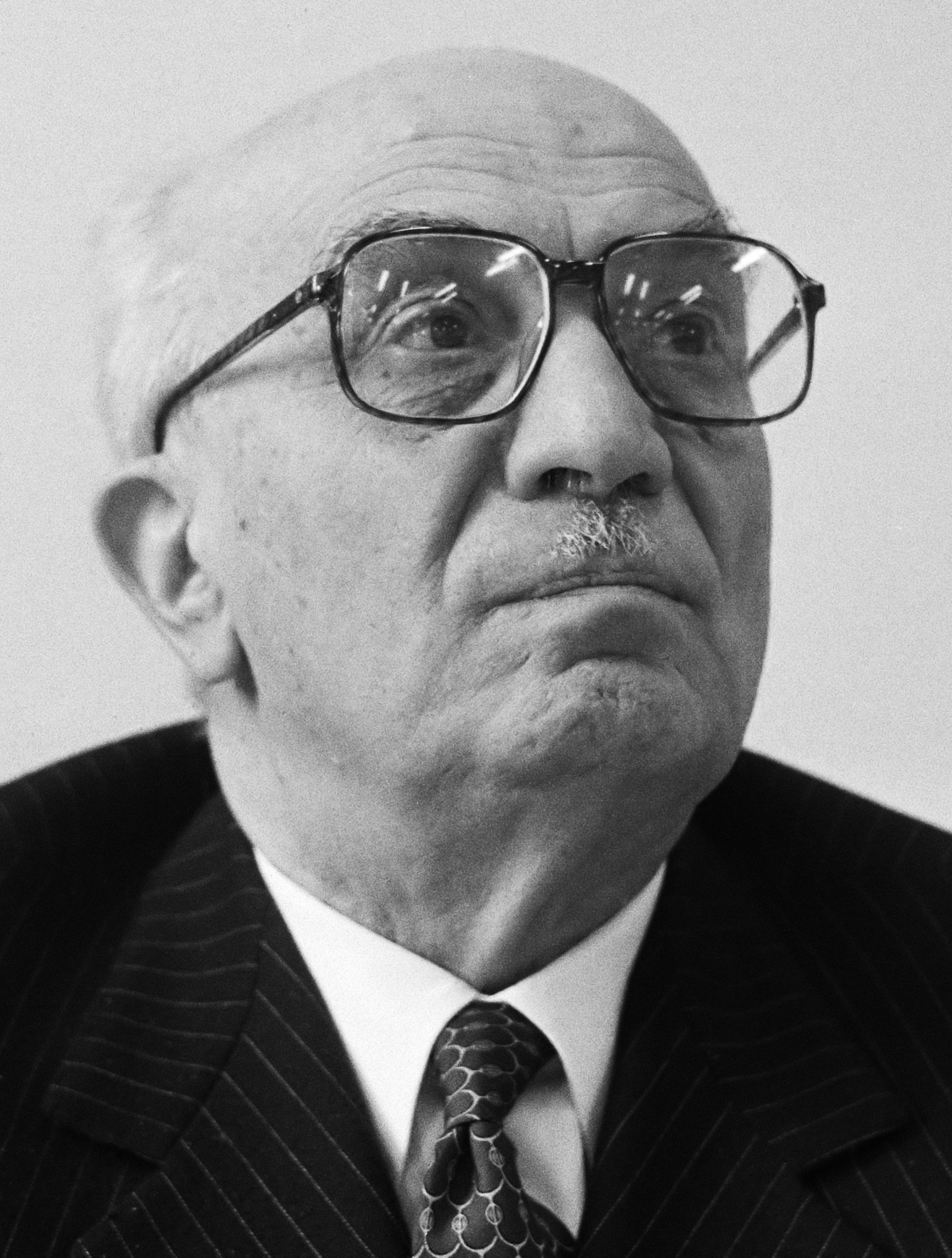
- Date formed: 18 April 1987
- Date dissolved: 29 July 1987

People and organisations
- Head of state: Francesco Cossiga
- Head of government: Amintore Fanfani
- Total no. of members: 27 (incl. Prime Minister)
- Member parties: DC; External support: PSI, PSDI, PR
- Status in legislature: Minority government
- Opposition parties: PCI, MSI, PRI, PLI, DP

History
- Outgoing election: 1987 election
- Legislature term: IX Legislature (1983–1987)
- Predecessor: Craxi II Cabinet
- Successor: Goria Cabinet

The Fanfani VI Cabinet was the 44th cabinet of the Italian Republic. The government held office from 18 April 1987 to 29 July 1987, for a total of 102 days.

The Fanfani VI Cabinet, composed only of DC ministers with some independent exponents, did not gain the confidence of the Chamber of Deputies following a surreal vote: PSI, PSDI and Radicals, that were excluded from the government, voted in favor of the confidence motion, while the Christian Democrats abstained. This government was born with the only aim of managing the electoral transition and had explicitly asked its "parliamentary base" not to vote in favour of the government during its presentation to the Chambers.

The government fell immediately, 11 days after its formation, causing Fanfani's resignation and the early dissolution of the Chambers. The Fanfani VI Government has also been accused of an unprejudiced enlargement of the perimeter of the so-called "current business".

== Party breakdown ==
- Christian Democracy (DC): Prime minister, 19 ministers, 33 undersecretaries
- Independents: 6 ministers

== Composition ==
Portfolio	Minister	Took office	Left office	Party
Prime Minister	Amintore Fanfani	18 April 1987	29 July 1987	DC
Minister of Foreign Affairs	Giulio Andreotti	18 April 1987	29 July 1987	DC
Minister of the Interior	Oscar Luigi Scalfaro	18 April 1987	29 July 1987	DC
Minister of Grace and Justice	Virginio Rognoni	18 April 1987	29 July 1987	DC
Minister of Budget and Economic Planning	Giovanni Goria (ad interim)	18 April 1987	29 July 1987	DC
Minister of Finance	Giuseppe Guarino	18 April 1987	29 July 1987	DC
Minister of Treasury	Giovanni Goria	18 April 1987	29 July 1987	DC
Minister of Defence	Remo Gaspari	18 April 1987	29 July 1987	DC
Minister of Public Education	Franca Falcucci	18 April 1987	29 July 1987	DC
Minister of Public Works	Giuseppe Zamberletti	18 April 1987	29 July 1987	DC
Minister of Agriculture and Forests	Filippo Maria Pandolfi	18 April 1987	29 July 1987	DC
Minister of Transport	Giovanni Travaglini	18 April 1987	29 July 1987	Independent
Minister of Post and Telecommunications	Antonio Gava	18 April 1987	29 July 1987	DC
Minister of Industry, Commerce and Craftsmanship	Franco Piga	18 April 1987	29 July 1987	DC
Minister of Health	Carlo Donat-Cattin	18 April 1987	29 July 1987	DC
Minister of Foreign Trade	Mario Sarcinelli	18 April 1987	29 July 1987	Independent
Minister of Merchant Navy	Costante Degan	18 April 1987	29 July 1987	DC
Minister of State Holdings	Clelio Darida	18 April 1987	29 July 1987	DC
Minister of Labour and Social Security	Ermanno Gorrieri	18 April 1987	29 July 1987	Independent
Minister of Cultural and Environmental Heritage	Antonino Pietro Gullotti	18 April 1987	29 July 1987	DC
Minister of Tourism and Entertainment	Mario Di Lazzaro	18 April 1987	29 July 1987	Independent
Minister of the Environment	Mario Pavan	18 April 1987	29 July 1987	DC
Minister of Regional Affairs and Public Function (without portfolio)	Livio Paladin	18 April 1987	29 July 1987	Independent
Minister for the Coordination of Scientific and Technological Research Initiatives (without portfolio)	Luigi Granelli	18 April 1987	29 July 1987	DC
Minister for the Coordination of Civil Protection (without portfolio)	Remo Gaspari	18 April 1987	29 July 1987	DC
Minister for Extraordinary Interventions in the South (without portfolio)	Salverino De Vito	18 April 1987	29 July 1987	DC
Minister for Parliamentary Relations (without portfolio)	Gaetano Gifuni	18 April 1987	29 July 1987	Independent
Secretary of the Council of Ministers	Mauro Bubbico	18 April 1987	29 July 1987	DC
