= Minister of Foreign Affairs (Italy) =

Minister in the Cabinet of Italy

Minister of Foreign Affairs and International Cooperation
- Ministro degli Affari Esteri e della Cooperazione Internazionale

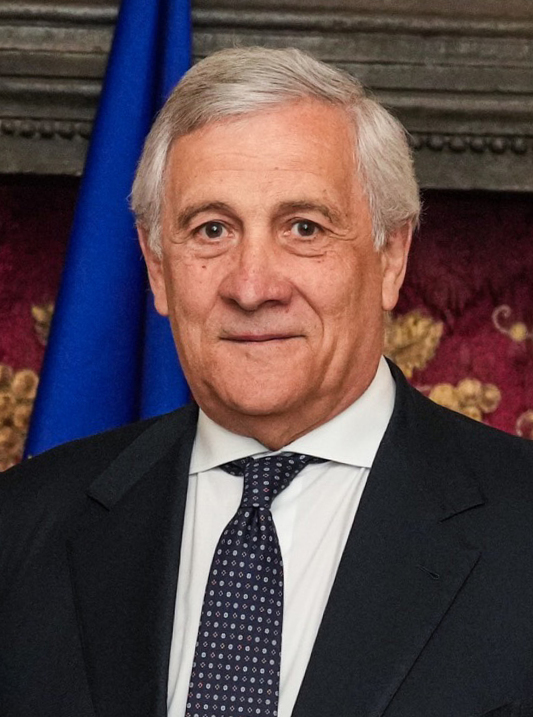
- Incumbent; Antonio Tajani since 22 October 2022
- Ministry of Foreign Affairs
- Member of: Council of Ministers; High Council of Defence
- Seat: Palazzo della Farnesina
- Appointer: The president of Italy
- Term length: No fixed term
- Formation: March 23, 1861; 165 years ago
- First holder: Camillo Benso, Count of Cavour
- Website: www.esteri.it

The minister of foreign affairs is the head of the Ministry of Foreign Affairs in Italy. The office was one of the positions which Italy inherited from the Kingdom of Sardinia where it was the most ancient ministry of the government: this origin gives to the office a ceremonial primacy in the Italian cabinet.

The current minister is Antonio Tajani, a member of Forza Italia, who is serving in the government of Giorgia Meloni since 22 October 2022.

== Kingdom of Italy ==
Parties

- 1861–1912:
  - Historical Right
  - Historical Left
  - Military
- 1912–1922:
  - Liberal Party
  - Radical Party
  - Democratic Liberal Party
- 1922–1943:
  - National Fascist Party
- 1943–1946:
  - Labour Democratic Party
  - Christian Democracy
  - Independent
  - Military

Coalitions

- 1861–1912:
  - Rightist coalition
  - Leftist coalition
  - Mixed coalition
- 1912–1922:
  - Liberal coalition
- 1922–1943:
  - Fascist
- 1943–1946:
  - Mixed coalition

Portrait	Name (Born–Died)	Term of office			Party	Government	Ref.
Portrait	Name (Born–Died)	Took office	Left office	Time in office	Party	Government	Ref.
Minister of Foreign Affairs
	Camillo Benso Count of Cavour (1810–1861) As Prime Minister	23 March 1861	6 June 1861	75 days	Historical Right	Cavour IV	
	Bettino Ricasoli (1809–1880) As Prime Minister	12 June 1861	3 March 1862	264 days	Historical Right	Ricasoli I	
	Urbano Rattazzi (1808–1873) As Prime Minister	3 March 1862	31 March 1862	28 days	Historical Left	Rattazzi I	
	Giacomo Durando (1807–1894)	31 March 1862	8 December 1862	252 days	Military	Rattazzi I	
	Giuseppe Pasolini (1815–1876)	8 December 1862	24 March 1863	106 days	Historical Right	Farini	
	Emilio Visconti Venosta (1829–1914)	24 March 1863	28 September 1864	1 year, 188 days	Historical Right	Minghetti I	
	Alfonso Ferrero La Marmora (1804–1878) As Prime Minister	28 September 1864	20 June 1866	1 year, 265 days	Military	La Marmora II·III	
	Bettino Ricasoli (1809–1880) As Prime Minister	20 June 1866	28 June 1866	8 days	Historical Right	Ricasoli II	
	Emilio Visconti Venosta (1829–1914)	28 June 1866	10 April 1867	286 days	Historical Right	Ricasoli II	
	Federico Pescetto (1817–1882)	10 April 1867	12 April 1867	2 days	Historical Right	Rattazzi II	
	Pompeo Di Campello (1803–1884)	12 April 1867	27 October 1867	198 days	Historical Left	Rattazzi II	
	Luigi Federico Menabrea (1809–1896) As Prime Minister	27 October 1867	14 December 1869	2 years, 48 days	Historical Right	Menabrea I·II·III	
	Emilio Visconti Venosta (1829–1914)	14 December 1869	20 November 1876	6 years, 342 days	Historical Right	Lanza; Minghetti II	
	Luigi Amedeo Melegari (1805–1881)	20 November 1876	28 December 1877	1 year, 38 days	Historical Left	Depretis I	
	Agostino Depretis (1813–1887) As Prime Minister	28 December 1877	24 March 1878	86 days	Historical Left	Depretis II	
	Luigi Corti (1823–1888)	24 March 1878	24 October 1878	214 days	Historical Left	Cairoli I	
	Benedetto Cairoli (1825–1889) As Prime Minister	24 October 1878	19 December 1878	56 days	Historical Left	Cairoli I	
	Agostino Depretis (1813–1887) As Prime Minister	19 December 1878	14 July 1879	207 days	Historical Left	Depretis III	
	Benedetto Cairoli (1825–1889) As Prime Minister	14 July 1879	29 May 1881	1 year, 319 days	Historical Left	Cairoli II·III	
	Pasquale Stanislao Mancini (1817–1888)	29 May 1881	29 June 1885	4 years, 31 days	Historical Left	Depretis IV·V·VI	
	Agostino Depretis (1813–1887) As Prime Minister	29 June 1885	6 October 1885	99 days	Historical Left	Depretis VII	
	Carlo Felice Nicolis, Count of Robilant (1826–1887)	6 October 1885	4 April 1887	1 year, 180 days	Military	Depretis VII	
	Agostino Depretis (1813–1887) As Prime Minister	4 April 1887	29 July 1887	116 days	Historical Left	Depretis VIII	
	Francesco Crispi (1818–1901) As Prime Minister	29 July 1887	6 February 1891	3 years, 192 days	Historical Left	Crispi I·II	
	Antonio Starabba di Rudinì (1839–1908) As Prime Minister	6 February 1891	15 May 1892	1 year, 99 days	Historical Right	Di Rudinì I	
	Benedetto Brin (1833–1898)	15 May 1892	15 December 1893	1 year, 214 days	Military	Giolitti I	
	Alberto Blanc (1835–1904)	15 December 1893	10 March 1896	2 years, 86 days	Historical Left	Crispi III·IV	
	Onorato Caetani (1842–1917)	10 March 1896	11 July 1896	123 days	Historical Right	Di Rudinì II	
	Emilio Visconti Venosta (1829–1914)	11 July 1896	1 June 1898	1 year, 325 days	Historical Right	Di Rudinì III·IV	
	Raffaele Cappelli (1848–1921)	1 June 1898	29 June 1898	28 days	Historical Right	Di Rudinì V	
	Felice Napoleone Canevaro (1838–1926)	29 June 1898	14 May 1899	319 days	Military	Pelloux I	
	Emilio Visconti Venosta (1829–1914)	14 May 1899	15 February 1901	1 year, 277 days	Historical Right	Pelloux II; Saracco	
	Giulio Prinetti (1851–1908)	15 February 1901	9 February 1903	1 year, 359 days	Historical Right	Zanardelli	
	Enrico Morin (1841–1910)	9 February 1903	3 September 1903	206 days	Military	Zanardelli	
	Tommaso Tittoni (1855–1931)	3 September 1903	27 March 1905	1 year, 205 days	Historical Right	Giolitti II; Tittoni	
	Alessandro Fortis (1842–1909) As Prime Minister	27 March 1905	24 December 1905	272 days	Historical Left	Fortis I	
	Antonio Paternò Castello di San Giuliano (1852–1914)	24 December 1905	8 February 1906	46 days	Historical Right	Fortis II	
	Francesco Guicciardini (1851–1915)	8 February 1906	29 May 1906	110 days	Historical Right	Sonnino I	
	Tommaso Tittoni (1855–1931)	29 May 1906	10 December 1909	3 years, 195 days	Historical Right	Giolitti III	
	Francesco Guicciardini (1851–1915)	11 December 1909	31 March 1910	110 days	Historical Right	Sonnino II	
	Antonio Paternò Castello di San Giuliano (1852–1914)	31 March 1910	17 October 1914	4 years, 210 days	Historical Right / Liberal Party	Luzzatti	
	Antonio Paternò Castello di San Giuliano (1852–1914)	31 March 1910	17 October 1914	4 years, 210 days	Historical Right / Liberal Party	Giolitti IV; Salandra I	
	Antonio Salandra (1853–1931) As Prime Minister	17 October 1914	31 October 1914	14 days	Liberal Party	Salandra I	
	Sidney Sonnino (1847–1922)	31 October 1914	23 June 1919	4 years, 235 days	Liberal Party	Salandra III; Boselli; Orlando	
	Tommaso Tittoni (1855–1931)	23 June 1919	26 June 1919	3 days	Liberal Party	Nitti I	
	Francesco Nitti (1868–1953) As Prime Minister	26 June 1919	26 September 1919	92 days	Italian Radical Party	Nitti I	
	Vittorio Scialoja (1856–1933)	26 September 1919	15 June 1920	263 days	Liberal Party	Nitti I·II	
	Carlo Sforza (1872–1952)	15 June 1920	4 July 1921	1 year, 19 days	Democratic Liberal Party	Giolitti V	
	Pietro Tomasi della Torretta (1873–1962)	4 July 1921	22 February 1922	233 days	Independent	Bonomi I	
	Carlo Schanzer (1865–1953)	26 February 1922	31 October 1922	251 days	Democratic Liberal Party	Facta I·II	
	Benito Mussolini (1883–1945) As Prime Minister	31 October 1922	12 September 1929	6 years, 316 days	National Fascist Party	Mussolini	
	Dino Grandi (1895–1988)	12 September 1929	20 July 1932	2 years, 312 days	National Fascist Party	Mussolini	
	Benito Mussolini (1883–1945) As Prime Minister	20 July 1932	9 June 1936	3 years, 325 days	National Fascist Party	Mussolini	
	Galeazzo Ciano (1903–1944)	9 June 1936	6 February 1943	6 years, 242 days	National Fascist Party	Mussolini	
	Benito Mussolini (1883–1945) As Prime Minister	6 February 1943	25 July 1943	169 days	National Fascist Party	Mussolini	
	Raffaele Guariglia (1889–1970)	25 July 1943	11 February 1944	201 days	Independent	Badoglio I	
	Pietro Badoglio (1871–1956) As Prime Minister	11 February 1944	18 June 1944	128 days	Military	Badoglio I·II	
	Ivanoe Bonomi (1873–1951)	18 June 1944	10 December 1944	175 days	Labour Democratic Party	Bonomi II	
	Alcide De Gasperi (1881–1954)	12 December 1944	13 July 1946	1 year, 224 days	Christian Democracy	Bonomi III; Parri; De Gasperi I	

== Italian Republic ==
Parties

- 1946–1994:
  - Christian Democracy
  - Italian Socialist Party
  - Italian Republican Party
  - Italian Liberal Party
  - Italian Democratic Socialist Party
  - Independent
- 1994–present:
  - Italian People's Party
  - Forza Italia / The People of Freedom
  - Italian Renewal
  - Democrats of the Left / Democratic Party
  - National Alliance
  - Italian Radicals
  - New Centre-Right / Popular Alternative
  - Five Star Movement / Together for the Future
  - Independent

Coalitions:

- 1946–1994:
  - Centrist coalition
  - Organic Centre-left
  - Pentapartito / Quadripartito
  - Mixed coalition
- 1994–present:
  - Centre-right coalition
  - Centre-left coalition
  - Mixed coalition

Portrait	Name (Born–Died)	Term of office			Party	Government	Ref.
Portrait	Name (Born–Died)	Took office	Left office	Time in office	Party	Government	Ref.
Minister of Foreign Affairs
	Alcide De Gasperi (1881–1954) As Prime Minister	13 July 1946	18 October 1946	97 days	Christian Democracy	De Gasperi II	
	Pietro Nenni (1891–1980)	18 October 1946	2 February 1947	107 days	Italian Socialist Party	De Gasperi II	
	Carlo Sforza (1872–1952)	2 February 1947	26 July 1951	4 years, 174 days	Italian Republican Party	De Gasperi III	
	Carlo Sforza (1872–1952)	2 February 1947	26 July 1951	4 years, 174 days	Italian Republican Party	De Gasperi IV·V·VI	
	Alcide De Gasperi (1881–1954) As Prime Minister	26 July 1951	17 August 1953	2 years, 22 days	Christian Democracy	De Gasperi VII·VIII	
	Giuseppe Pella (1902–1981) As Prime Minister	17 August 1953	18 January 1954	154 days	Christian Democracy	Pella	
	Attilio Piccioni (1892–1976)	18 January 1954	16 September 1954	241 days	Christian Democracy	Fanfani I Scelba	
	Gaetano Martino (1900–1967)	16 September 1954	19 May 1957	2 years, 245 days	Italian Liberal Party	Scelba; Segni I	
	Giuseppe Pella (1902–1981)	19 May 1957	1 July 1958	1 year, 43 days	Christian Democracy	Zoli	
	Amintore Fanfani (1908–1999) As Prime Minister	1 July 1958	16 February 1959	230 days	Christian Democracy	Fanfani II	
	Giuseppe Pella (1902–1981)	16 February 1959	25 March 1960	1 year, 38 days	Christian Democracy	Segni II	
	Antonio Segni (1891–1972)	25 March 1960	7 May 1962	2 years, 43 days	Christian Democracy	Tambroni; Fanfani III·IV	
	Amintore Fanfani (1908–1999) As Prime Minister	7 May 1962	29 May 1962	22 days	Christian Democracy	Fanfani IV	
	Attilio Piccioni (1892–1976)	29 May 1962	4 December 1963	1 year, 189 days	Christian Democracy	Fanfani IV; Leone I	
	Giuseppe Saragat (1898–1988)	4 December 1963	28 December 1964	1 year, 24 days	Italian Democratic Socialist Party	Moro I·II	
	Aldo Moro (1916–1978) As Prime Minister	28 December 1964	5 March 1965	67 days	Christian Democracy	Moro II	
	Amintore Fanfani (1908–1999)	5 March 1965	30 December 1965	300 days	Christian Democracy	Moro II	
	Aldo Moro (1916–1978) As Prime Minister	30 December 1965	23 February 1966	55 days	Christian Democracy	Moro II	
	Amintore Fanfani (1908–1999)	23 February 1966	24 June 1968	2 years, 122 days	Christian Democracy	Moro III	
	Giuseppe Medici (1907–2000)	24 June 1968	12 December 1968	171 days	Christian Democracy	Leone II	
	Pietro Nenni (1891–1980)	12 December 1968	5 August 1969	236 days	Italian Socialist Party	Rumor I	
	Aldo Moro (1916–1978)	5 August 1969	26 June 1972	2 years, 326 days	Christian Democracy	Rumor II	
	Aldo Moro (1916–1978)	5 August 1969	26 June 1972	2 years, 326 days	Christian Democracy	Rumor III; Colombo	
	Aldo Moro (1916–1978)	5 August 1969	26 June 1972	2 years, 326 days	Christian Democracy	Andreotti I	
	Giuseppe Medici (1907–2000)	26 July 1972	7 July 1973	346 days	Christian Democracy	Andreotti II	
	Aldo Moro (1916–1978)	7 July 1973	23 November 1974	1 year, 139 days	Christian Democracy	Rumor IV·V	
	Mariano Rumor (1915–1990)	23 November 1974	29 July 1976	1 year, 249 days	Christian Democracy	Moro IV·V	
	Arnaldo Forlani (1925–2023)	29 July 1976	4 August 1979	3 years, 6 days	Christian Democracy	Andreotti III·IV·V	
	Franco Maria Malfatti (1927–1991)	4 August 1979	15 January 1980	195 days	Christian Democracy	Cossiga I	
	Attilio Ruffini (1925–2011)	15 January 1980	4 April 1980	80 days	Christian Democracy	Cossiga I	
	Emilio Colombo (1920–2013)	4 April 1980	4 August 1983	3 years, 122 days	Christian Democracy	Cossiga II; Forlani	
	Emilio Colombo (1920–2013)	4 April 1980	4 August 1983	3 years, 122 days	Christian Democracy	Spadolini I·II; Fanfani V	
	Giulio Andreotti (1919–2013)	4 August 1983	22 July 1989	5 years, 352 days	Christian Democracy	Craxi I·II	
	Giulio Andreotti (1919–2013)	4 August 1983	22 July 1989	5 years, 352 days	Christian Democracy	Fanfani VI	
	Giulio Andreotti (1919–2013)	4 August 1983	22 July 1989	5 years, 352 days	Christian Democracy	Goria; De Mita	
	Gianni De Michelis (1940–2019)	22 July 1989	28 June 1992	2 years, 342 days	Italian Socialist Party	Andreotti VI·VII	
	Vincenzo Scotti (1933– )	28 June 1992	29 July 1992	31 days	Christian Democracy	Amato I	
	Giuliano Amato (1938– ) As Prime Minister	29 July 1992	1 August 1992	3 days	Italian Socialist Party	Amato I	
	Emilio Colombo (1920–2013)	1 August 1992	28 April 1993	270 days	Christian Democracy	Amato I	
	Beniamino Andreatta (1928–2007)	28 April 1993	19 April 1994	356 days	Christian Democracy / Italian People's Party	Ciampi	
	Leopoldo Elia (1925–2008)	19 April 1994	10 May 1994	22 days	Italian People's Party	Ciampi	
	Antonio Martino (1942–2022)	10 May 1994	17 January 1995	252 days	Forza Italia	Berlusconi I	
	Susanna Agnelli (1922–2009)	17 January 1995	17 May 1996	1 year, 121 days	Independent	Dini	
	Lamberto Dini (1931– )	17 May 1996	6 June 2001	5 years, 20 days	Italian Renewal	Prodi I D'Alema I·II; Amato II	
	Giuliano Amato (1938– ) As Prime Minister	6 June 2001	11 June 2001	5 days	Independent	Amato II	
	Renato Ruggiero (1930–2013)	11 June 2001	6 January 2002	209 days	Independent	Berlusconi II	
	Silvio Berlusconi (1936–2023) As Prime Minister	6 January 2002	14 June 2002	159 days	Forza Italia	Berlusconi II	
	Franco Frattini (1957–2022)	14 June 2002	18 November 2004	2 years, 157 days	Forza Italia	Berlusconi II	
	Gianfranco Fini (1952– )	18 November 2004	17 May 2006	1 year, 180 days	National Alliance	Berlusconi II·III	
	Massimo D'Alema (1949– )	17 May 2006	8 May 2008	1 year, 357 days	Democrats of the Left / Democratic Party	Prodi II	
	Franco Frattini (1957–2022)	8 May 2008	16 November 2011	3 years, 192 days	The People of Freedom	Berlusconi IV	
	Giulio Terzi di Sant'Agata (1946– )	16 November 2011	27 March 2013	1 year, 131 days	Independent	Monti	
	Mario Monti (1943– ) As Prime Minister	27 March 2013	28 April 2013	32 days	Independent	Monti	
	Emma Bonino (1948–2026)	28 April 2013	22 February 2014	300 days	Italian Radicals	Letta	
Minister of Foreign Affairs and International Cooperation
	Federica Mogherini (1973– )	22 February 2014	31 October 2014	251 days	Democratic Party	Renzi	
	Paolo Gentiloni (1954– )	31 October 2014	12 December 2016	2 years, 42 days	Democratic Party	Renzi	
	Angelino Alfano (1970– )	12 December 2016	1 June 2018	1 year, 171 days	New Centre-Right / Popular Alternative	Gentiloni	
	Enzo Moavero Milanesi (1954– )	1 June 2018	5 September 2019	1 year, 96 days	Independent	Conte I	
	Luigi Di Maio (1986– )	5 September 2019	22 October 2022	3 years, 47 days	Five Star Movement / Together for the Future	Conte II; Draghi	
	Antonio Tajani (1953– )	22 October 2022	Incumbent	3 years, 324 days	Forza Italia	Meloni	

== See also ==
- Affari Esteri
- Foreign policy
