= First Andreotti government =

27th government of the Italian Republic

Andreotti I Cabinet
- 27th Cabinet of Italy

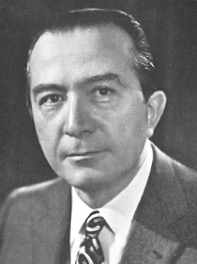
- Date formed: 18 February 1972
- Date dissolved: 26 June 1972

People and organisations
- Head of state: Giovanni Leone
- Head of government: Giulio Andreotti
- Member parties: DC
- Status in legislature: Minority government

History
- Outgoing election: 1972 election
- Legislature term: V Legislature (1968–1972)
- Predecessor: Colombo Cabinet
- Successor: Andreotti II Cabinet

The Andreotti I Cabinet was the 27th cabinet of the Italian Republic.

With a total of 152 votes in favor and 158 against, the government did not gain the confidence of the Senate and was forced to resign after only 9 days. So far, this government has been the one with the shortest period of full powers in the history of the Italian Republic, and the third one to be refused by the vote of confidence by the parliament, which caused the first early elections of the Republic.

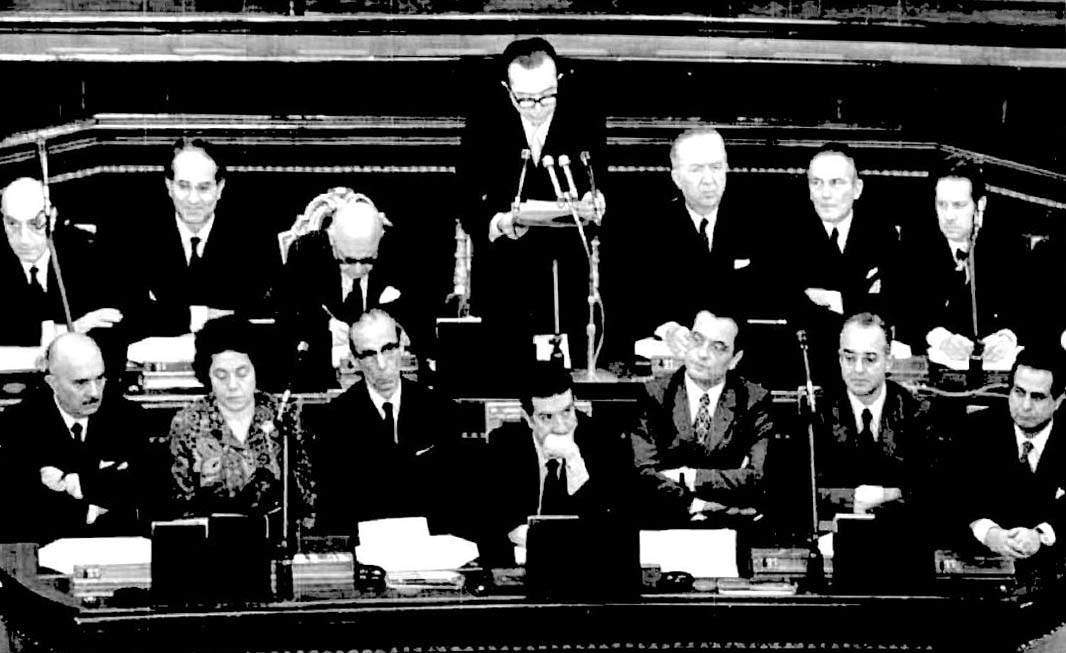
Andreotti while illustrating the government program to Parliament.

== Composition ==
Portfolio	Minister	Took office	Left office	Party
Prime Minister	Giulio Andreotti	18 February 1972	26 June 1972	DC
Minister of Foreign Affairs	Aldo Moro	18 February 1972	26 June 1972	DC
Minister of the Interior	Mariano Rumor	18 February 1972	26 June 1972	DC
Minister of Grace and Justice	Guido Gonella	18 February 1972	26 June 1972	DC
Minister of Budget and Economic Planning	Paolo Emilio Taviani	18 February 1972	26 June 1972	DC
Minister of Finance	Giuseppe Pella	18 February 1972	26 June 1972	DC
Minister of Treasury	Emilio Colombo	18 February 1972	26 June 1972	DC
Minister of Defence	Franco Restivo	18 February 1972	26 June 1972	DC
Minister of Public Education	Riccardo Misasi	18 February 1972	26 June 1972	DC
Minister of Public Works	Mario Ferrari Aggradi	18 February 1972	26 June 1972	DC
Minister of Agriculture and Forests	Lorenzo Natali	18 February 1972	26 June 1972	DC
Minister of Transport and Civil Aviation	Oscar Luigi Scalfaro	18 February 1972	26 June 1972	DC
Minister of Post and Telecommunications	Giacinto Bosco	18 February 1972	26 June 1972	DC
Minister of Industry, Commerce and Craftsmanship	Silvio Gava	18 February 1972	26 June 1972	DC
Minister of Health	Athos Valsecchi	18 February 1972	26 June 1972	DC
Minister of Foreign Trade	Camillo Ripamonti	18 February 1972	26 June 1972	DC
Minister of Merchant Navy	Gennaro Cassiani	18 February 1972	26 June 1972	DC
Minister of State Holdings	Flaminio Piccoli	18 February 1972	31 May 1972	DC
Minister of State Holdings	Giulio Andreotti (ad interim)	31 May 1972	26 June 1972	DC
Minister of Labour and Social Security	Carlo Donat-Cattin	18 February 1972	26 June 1972	DC
Minister of Tourism and Entertainment	Giovanni Battista Scaglia	18 February 1972	26 June 1972	DC
Minister for Parliamentary Relations and Particular Political and Coordination Tasks (Note: with special regard to the Presidency of the Italian delegation to the UN) (without portfolio)	Carlo Russo	18 February 1972	26 June 1972	DC
Minister for Extraordinary Interventions in the South (without portfolio)	Italo Giulio Caiati	18 February 1972	26 June 1972	DC
Minister for the Problems Related to the Implementation of the Regions (without portfolio)	Eugenio Gatto	18 February 1972	26 June 1972	DC
Minister for Scientific Research (without portfolio)	Fiorentino Sullo	18 February 1972	26 June 1972	DC
Minister for Public Administration Reform (without portfolio)	Remo Gaspari	18 February 1972	26 June 1972	DC
Secretary of the Council of Ministers	Franco Evangelisti	18 February 1972	26 June 1972	DC
