= Bernardino Giannuzzi Savelli =

Italian magistrate and politician

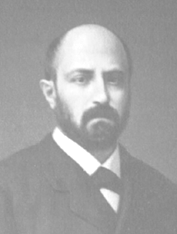

Minister of Justice
- In office 25 May 1883 – 30 March 1884
- Preceded by: Giuseppe Zanardelli
- Succeeded by: Niccolò Ferracciù

Senator
- In office 21 June 1881 – 19 November 1887)

Bernardino Giannuzzi Savelli (Cosenza, 19 November 1822 – Rome, 10 November 1887) was an Italian magistrate and politician.

== Biography ==
He was born in Cosenza on 19 November 1822, the eldest son of Domenico, Baron of Pietramala and of Rosa Maria Mollo, daughter of Baron Saverio. He came from a branch of the old aristocratic Savelli family. He studied in Cosenza, showing an uncommon ability to learn, and at the Federico II University of Naples, graduating in law.

In 1845 he entered the judiciary, and held the position of public prosecutor in one of the most difficult moments of the Kingdom of the Two Sicilies and began to progress rapidly in a judicial career. In February 1862 he moved to Turin as a member of the Commission for Legislative Studies that was working n the integration of Neapolitan and Piedmontese law.

In 1878, accepting the invitation of Cardinal Guglielmo Sanfelice d'Acquavella, metropolitan archbishop of Naples, he was for a short period a municipal councilor of the city. In 1878 he was the first president of the Court of Appeal of Rome. During the same period he was president of the Commission for the preparation of the Commercial Code. On 21 June 1881, on the proposal of Giuseppe Zanardelli, he was appointed senator of the Kingdom by King Umberto I. On 25 May 1883 Prime Minister Agostino Depretis invited him to join the government as Minister of the Seals and Minister of Justice and Religion. He was very active in the preparation of the Penal Code to which he tried to give a markedly liberal character.

He was vice president of the Senate of the Kingdom of Italy from May 1886 until his death in Rome on 10 November 1887.
