= Second Menabrea government =

11th Government of Kingdom of Italy

Menabrea II government
- 11th Cabinet of Italy

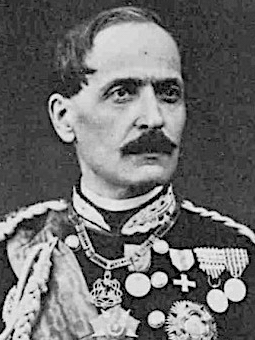
- Date formed: 5 January 1868
- Date dissolved: 13 May 1869

People and organisations
- Head of state: Victor Emmanuel II
- Head of government: Luigi Federico Menabrea
- Total no. of members: 9
- Member party: Historical Right

History
- Predecessor: Menabrea I Cabinet
- Successor: Menabrea III Cabinet

The Menabrea II government of Italy held office from 5 January 1868 until 13 May 1869, a total of 494 days, or 1 year, 4 months and 8 days.

== Government parties ==
The government was composed by the following parties:

Party	Ideology	Leader
Historical Right	Conservatism	Luigi Federico Menabrea

== Composition ==
Office	Name	Party	Term
Prime Minister	Luigi Federico Menabrea	Historical Right	(1868–1869)
Minister of the Interior	Carlo Cadorna	Historical Right	(1868–1868)
Minister of the Interior	Girolamo Cantelli	Historical Right	(1868–1869)
Minister of Foreign Affairs	Luigi Federico Menabrea	Historical Right	(1868–1869)
Minister of Grace and Justice	Gennaro De Filippo	Historical Right	(1868–1869)
Minister of Finance	Luigi Guglielmo Cambray-Digny	Historical Right	(1868–1869)
Minister of War	Ettore Bertolè-Viale	Military	(1868–1869)
Minister of the Navy	Augusto Riboty	Military	(1868–1869)
Minister of Agriculture, Industry and Commerce	Emilio Broglio	Historical Right	(1868–1868)
Minister of Agriculture, Industry and Commerce	Antonio Ciccone	Historical Right	(1868–1869)
Minister of Public Works	Girolamo Cantelli	Historical Right	(1868–1868)
Minister of Public Works	Lodovico Pasini	Independent	(1868–1869)
Minister of Public Education	Emilio Broglio	Historical Right	(1868–1869)
