= Minister of the Interior (Italy) =

Ministry in the Cabinet of Italy

- Ministro dell'Interno

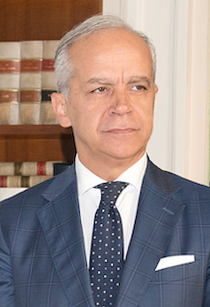
- Incumbent; Matteo Piantedosi since 22 October 2022
- Ministry of the Interior
- Member of: Council of Ministers; High Council of Defence
- Seat: Palazzo del Viminale, Rome
- Appointer: The president of Italy
- Term length: No fixed term
- Formation: March 23, 1861; 165 years ago
- First holder: Marco Minghetti
- Website: www.interno.gov.it

The minister of the interior (Italian: ministro dell'interno) in Italy is one of the most important positions in the Italian Council of Ministers and leads the Ministry of the Interior. The current minister is prefect Matteo Piantedosi, appointed on 22 October 22 in the Meloni Cabinet.

The minister of the interior is responsible for internal security and the protection of the constitutional order, for civil protection against disasters and terrorism, for displaced persons and administrative questions. It is host to the Standing Committee of Interior Ministers and also drafts all passport, identity card, firearms, and explosives legislation.

The interior minister is political head for the administration of internal affairs. They control the State police, the Vigili del Fuoco, and the prefects. The minister therefore sits on the High Council of Defence.

== List of Italian ministers of interior ==
=== Kingdom of Italy ===
Parties

- 1861–1912:
  - Historical Right
  - Historical Left
- 1912–1922:
  - Liberal Party
  - Radical Party
  - Reformist Socialist Party
  - Military
- 1922–1943:
  - National Fascist Party
- 1943–1946:
  - Christian Democracy
  - Labour Democratic Party
  - Action Party
  - Italian Socialist Party
  - Independent

Coalitions

- 1861–1912:
  - Rightist coalition
  - Leftist coalition
  - Mixed coalition
- 1912–1922:
  - Liberal coalition
- 1922–1943:
  - Fascist
- 1943–1946:
  - Mixed coalition

Portrait	Name (Born–Died)	Term of office			Party	Government	Ref.
Portrait	Name (Born–Died)	Took office	Left office	Time in office	Party	Government	Ref.
	Marco Minghetti (1818–1886)	23 March 1861	1 September 1861	162 days	Historical Right	Cavour IV; Ricasoli I	
	Bettino Ricasoli (1809–1880) As Prime Minister	1 September 1861	3 March 1862	183 days	Historical Right	Ricasoli I	
	Urbano Rattazzi (1808–1873) As Prime Minister	3 March 1862	8 December 1862	280 days	Historical Left	Rattazzi I	
	Ubaldino Peruzzi (1822–1891)	8 December 1862	28 September 1864	1 year, 295 days	Historical Left	Farini; Minghetti I	
	Giovanni Lanza (1810–1882)	28 September 1864	1 September 1865	338 days	Historical Right	La Marmora II	
	Giuseppe Natoli (1815–1867)	1 September 1865	14 December 1865	104 days	Historical Right	La Marmora II	
	Desiderato Chiaves (1825–1895)	14 December 1865	20 June 1866	188 days	Historical Right	La Marmora II·III	
	Bettino Ricasoli (1809–1880) As Prime Minister	29 June 1866	10 April 1867	285 days	Historical Right	Ricasoli II	
	Urbano Rattazzi (1808–1873) As Prime Minister	10 April 1867	27 October 1867	200 days	Historical Left	Rattazzi II	
	Filippo Antonio Gualtiero (1819–1874)	27 October 1867	17 January 1868	82 days	Historical Right	Menabrea I·II	
	Carlo Cadorna (1809–1881)	17 January 1868	10 September 1868	237 days	Historical Right	Menabrea II	
	Girolamo Cantelli (1815–1884)	10 September 1868	13 May 1869	245 days	Historical Right	Menabrea II	
	Luigi Ferraris (1813–1900)	13 May 1869	22 October 1869	162 days	Historical Right	Menabrea III	
	Antonio Starabba di Rudinì (1839–1908)	22 October 1869	14 December 1869	53 days	Historical Right	Menabrea III	
	Giovanni Lanza (1810–1882) As Prime Minister	14 December 1869	10 July 1873	3 years, 208 days	Historical Right	Lanza	
	Girolamo Cantelli (1815–1884)	10 July 1873	25 March 1876	2 years, 259 days	Historical Right	Minghetti II	
	Giovanni Nicotera (1826–1894)	25 March 1876	25 December 1877	1 year, 275 days	Historical Left	Depretis I	
	Francesco Crispi (1818–1901)	26 December 1877	7 March 1878	71 days	Historical Left	Depretis II	
	Agostino Depretis (1813–1887) As Prime Minister	7 March 1878	24 March 1878	17 days	Historical Left	Depretis II	
	Giuseppe Zanardelli (1826–1903)	24 March 1878	19 December 1878	270 days	Historical Left	Cairoli I	
	Agostino Depretis (1813–1887) As Prime Minister	19 December 1878	14 July 1879	207 days	Historical Left	Depretis III	
	Tommaso Villa (1832–1915)	14 July 1879	25 November 1879	1 year, 134 days	Historical Left	Cairoli II	
	Agostino Depretis (1813–1887) As Prime Minister	25 November 1879	4 April 1887	7 years, 130 days	Historical Left	Cairoli II; Depretis IV·V· VI·VII·VIII	
	Francesco Crispi (1818–1901) As Prime Minister (Note: From July 1887 to February 1891.)	4 April 1887	6 February 1891	3 years, 308 days	Historical Left	Depretis VIII; Crispi I·II	
	Giovanni Nicotera (1826–1894)	6 February 1891	15 May 1892	1 year, 99 days	Historical Left	Di Rudinì I	
	Giovanni Giolitti (1842–1928) As Prime Minister	15 May 1892	15 December 1893	1 year, 214 days	Historical Left	Giolitti I	
	Francesco Crispi (1818–1901) As Prime Minister	15 December 1893	10 March 1896	2 years, 86 days	Historical Left	Crispi III	
	Antonio Starabba di Rudinì (1839–1908) As Prime Minister	10 March 1896	29 June 1898	2 years, 111 days	Historical Right	Di Rudinì II·III·IV·V	
	Luigi Pelloux (1839–1924) As Prime Minister	29 June 1898	24 June 1900	1 year, 360 days	Military	Pelloux I·II	
	Giuseppe Saracco (1821–1907) As Prime Minister	24 June 1900	15 February 1901	236 days	Historical Left	Saracco	
	Giovanni Giolitti (1842–1928)	15 February 1901	20 June 1903	2 years, 125 days	Historical Left	Zanardelli	
	Giuseppe Zanardelli (1826–1903) As Prime Minister	20 June 1903	3 November 1903	136 days	Historical Left	Zanardelli	
	Giovanni Giolitti (1842–1928) As Prime Minister	3 November 1903	12 March 1905	1 year, 129 days	Historical Left	Giolitti III	
	Tommaso Tittoni (1855–1931) As Prime Minister	12 March 1905	28 March 1905	16 days	Historical Right	Tittoni	
	Alessandro Fortis (1842–1909) As Prime Minister	28 March 1905	8 February 1906	317 days	Historical Left	Fortis I·II	
	Sidney Sonnino (1847–1922) As Prime Minister	8 February 1906	29 May 1906	110 days	Historical Right	Sonnino I	
	Giovanni Giolitti (1842–1928) As Prime Minister	29 May 1906	11 December 1909	3 years, 196 days	Historical Left	Giolitti III	
	Sidney Sonnino (1847–1922) As Prime Minister	11 December 1909	31 March 1910	110 days	Historical Right	Sonnino II	
	Luigi Luzzatti (1841–1927) As Prime Minister	31 March 1910	30 March 1911	364 days	Historical Right	Luzzatti	
	Giovanni Giolitti (1842–1928) As Prime Minister	30 March 1911	21 March 1914	2 years, 356 days	Liberal Party	Giolitti IV	
	Antonio Salandra (1853–1931) As Prime Minister	21 March 1914	18 June 1916	2 years, 89 days	Liberal Party	Salandra I·II	
	Vittorio Emanuele Orlando (1860–1952) As Prime Minister (Note: From October 1917 to June 1919.)	18 June 1916	23 June 1919	3 years, 5 days	Liberal Party	Boselli; Orlando	
	Francesco Saverio Nitti (1868–1953) As Prime Minister	23 June 1919	15 June 1920	358 days	Italian Radical Party	Nitti I·II	
	Giovanni Giolitti (1842–1928) As Prime Minister	15 June 1920	4 July 1921	1 year, 19 days	Liberal Party	Giolitti V	
	Ivanoe Bonomi (1873–1951) As Prime Minister	4 July 1921	26 February 1922	237 days	Italian Reformist Socialist Party	Bonomi I	
	Luigi Facta (1861–1930) As Prime Minister	26 February 1922	1 August 1922	156 days	Liberal Party	Facta I	
	Paolino Taddei (1860–1925)	1 August 1922	31 October 1922	91 days	Liberal Party	Facta II	
	Benito Mussolini (1883–1945) As Prime Minister	31 October 1922	17 June 1924	1 year, 230 days	National Fascist Party	Mussolini	
	Luigi Federzoni (1878–1967)	17 June 1924	6 November 1926	2 years, 142 days	National Fascist Party	Mussolini	
	Benito Mussolini (1883–1945) As Prime Minister	6 November 1926	25 July 1943	16 years, 261 days	National Fascist Party	Mussolini	
	Bruno Fornaciari (1881–1959)	25 July 1943	9 August 1943	15 days	Independent	Badoglio I	
	Umberto Ricci (1878–1957)	9 August 1943	8 September 1943	30 days	Independent	Badoglio I	
	Vito Reale (1883–1953)	16 November 1943	24 April 1944	160 days	Independent	Badoglio I	
	Salvatore Aldisio (1890–1964)	24 April 1944	18 June 1944	55 days	Christian Democracy	Badoglio II	
	Ivanoe Bonomi (1873–1951) As Prime Minister	18 June 1944	21 June 1945	1 year, 3 days	Labour Democratic Party	Bonomi II·III	
	Ferruccio Parri (1890–1981) As Prime Minister	21 June 1945	10 December 1945	172 days	Action Party	Parri	
	Giuseppe Romita (1887–1958)	10 December 1945	13 July 1946	215 days	Italian Socialist Party	De Gasperi I	

=== Italian Republic ===
Parties

- 1946–1994:
  - Christian Democracy
- 1994–present:
  - Italian People's Party
  - Northern League / League
  - Democratic Party of the Left
  - The Democrats
  - Forza Italia
  - Democratic Party
  - New Centre-Right
  - Independent

Coalitions

- 1946–1994:
  - Centrist coalition
  - Organic Centre-left
  - Pentapartito / Quadripartito
  - Mixed coalition
- 1994–present:
  - Centre-right coalition
  - Centre-left coalition
  - Mixed coalition

Portrait	Name (Born–Died)	Term of office			Party	Government	Ref.
Portrait	Name (Born–Died)	Took office	Left office	Time in office	Party	Government	Ref.
	Alcide De Gasperi (1881–1954) As Prime Minister	13 July 1946	2 February 1947	204 days	Christian Democracy	De Gasperi II	
	Mario Scelba (1901–1991)	2 February 1947	16 July 1953	8 years, 164 days	Christian Democracy	De Gasperi III	
	Mario Scelba (1901–1991)	2 February 1947	16 July 1953	8 years, 164 days	Christian Democracy	De Gasperi IV·V· VI·VII·VIII	
	Amintore Fanfani (1908–1999)	17 August 1953	18 January 1954	154 days	Christian Democracy	Pella	
	Giulio Andreotti (1919–2013)	18 January 1954	10 February 1954	23 days	Christian Democracy	Fanfani I	
	Mario Scelba (1901–1991) As Prime Minister	10 February 1954	6 July 1955	1 year, 146 days	Christian Democracy	Scelba	
	Fernando Tambroni (1901–1963)	6 July 1955	15 February 1959	3 years, 224 days	Christian Democracy	Segni I Zoli; Fanfani II	
	Antonio Segni (1891–1972) As Prime Minister	15 February 1959	25 March 1960	1 year, 39 days	Christian Democracy	Segni II	
	Giuseppe Spataro (1897–1978)	25 March 1960	26 July 1960	123 days	Christian Democracy	Tambroni	
	Mario Scelba (1901–1991)	26 July 1960	21 February 1962	1 year, 210 days	Christian Democracy	Fanfani III	
	Paolo Emilio Taviani (1912–2001)	21 February 1962	21 June 1963	1 year, 120 days	Christian Democracy	Fanfani IV	
	Mariano Rumor (1915–1990)	21 June 1963	4 December 1963	166 days	Christian Democracy	Leone I	
	Paolo Emilio Taviani (1912–2001)	4 December 1963	24 June 1968	4 years, 203 days	Christian Democracy	Moro I·II·III	
	Franco Restivo (1911–1976)	24 June 1968	17 February 1972	3 years, 238 days	Christian Democracy	Leone II	
	Franco Restivo (1911–1976)	24 June 1968	17 February 1972	3 years, 238 days	Christian Democracy	Rumor I	
	Franco Restivo (1911–1976)	24 June 1968	17 February 1972	3 years, 238 days	Christian Democracy	Rumor II	
	Franco Restivo (1911–1976)	24 June 1968	17 February 1972	3 years, 238 days	Christian Democracy	Rumor III; Colombo	
	Mariano Rumor (1915–1990)	17 February 1972	7 July 1973	1 year, 140 days	Christian Democracy	Andreotti I·II	
	Paolo Emilio Taviani (1912–2001)	7 July 1973	23 November 1974	1 year, 139 days	Christian Democracy	Rumor IV·V	
	Luigi Gui (1914–2010)	23 November 1974	12 February 1976	1 year, 81 days	Christian Democracy	Moro IV	
	Francesco Cossiga (1928–2010)	12 February 1976	11 May 1978	2 years, 88 days	Christian Democracy	Moro V Andreotti III·IV	
	Giulio Andreotti (1919–2013)	11 May 1978	13 June 1978	33 days	Christian Democracy	Andreotti IV	
	Virginio Rognoni (1924–2022)	13 June 1978	4 August 1983	5 years, 52 days	Christian Democracy	Andreotti IV·V; Cossiga I	
	Virginio Rognoni (1924–2022)	13 June 1978	4 August 1983	5 years, 52 days	Christian Democracy	Cossiga II; Forlani	
	Virginio Rognoni (1924–2022)	13 June 1978	4 August 1983	5 years, 52 days	Christian Democracy	Spadolini I·II; Fanfani V	
	Oscar Luigi Scalfaro (1918–2012)	4 August 1983	28 July 1987	4 years, 111 days	Christian Democracy	Craxi I·II	
	Oscar Luigi Scalfaro (1918–2012)	4 August 1983	28 July 1987	4 years, 111 days	Christian Democracy	Fanfani VI	
	Amintore Fanfani (1908–1999)	28 July 1987	13 April 1988	260 days	Christian Democracy	Goria	
	Antonio Gava (1930–2008)	13 April 1988	16 October 1990	2 years, 186 days	Christian Democracy	De Mita; Andreotti VI	
	Vincenzo Scotti (1933– )	16 October 1990	28 June 1992	1 year, 256 days	Christian Democracy	Andreotti VI·VII	
	Nicola Mancino (1931– )	28 June 1992	19 April 1994	1 year, 295 days	Christian Democracy / Italian People's Party	Amato I	
	Nicola Mancino (1931– )	28 June 1992	19 April 1994	1 year, 295 days	Christian Democracy / Italian People's Party	Ciampi	
	Carlo Azeglio Ciampi (1920–2016) As Prime Minister	19 April 1994	10 May 1994	21 days	Independent	Ciampi	
	Roberto Maroni (1955–2022)	10 May 1994	17 January 1995	252 days	Northern League	Berlusconi I	
	Antonio Brancaccio (1923–1995)	17 January 1995	8 June 1995	142 days	Independent	Dini	
	Giovanni Rinaldo Coronas (1919–2008)	8 June 1995	17 May 1996	344 days	Independent	Dini	
	Giorgio Napolitano (1925–2023)	17 May 1996	21 October 1998	2 years, 157 days	Democratic Party of the Left	Prodi I	
	Rosa Russo Iervolino (1936– )	21 October 1998	22 December 1999	1 year, 62 days	Italian People's Party	D'Alema I	
	Enzo Bianco (1951– )	22 December 1999	11 June 2001	1 year, 171 days	The Democrats	D'Alema II; Amato II	
	Claudio Scajola (1948– )	11 June 2001	3 July 2002	1 year, 22 days	Forza Italia	Berlusconi II	
	Giuseppe Pisanu (1937– )	3 July 2002	17 May 2006	3 years, 318 days	Forza Italia	Berlusconi II·III	
	Giuliano Amato (1938– )	17 May 2006	8 May 2008	1 year, 357 days	Independent / Democratic Party	Prodi II	
	Roberto Maroni (1955–2022)	8 May 2008	16 November 2011	3 years, 192 days	Northern League	Berlusconi IV	
	Annamaria Cancellieri (1943– )	16 November 2011	28 April 2013	1 year, 163 days	Independent	Monti	
	Angelino Alfano (1970– )	28 April 2013	12 December 2016	3 years, 228 days	The People of Freedom / New Centre-Right	Letta	
	Angelino Alfano (1970– )	28 April 2013	12 December 2016	3 years, 228 days	The People of Freedom / New Centre-Right	Renzi	
	Marco Minniti (1956– )	12 December 2016	1 June 2018	1 year, 171 days	Democratic Party	Gentiloni	
	Matteo Salvini (1973– )	1 June 2018	5 September 2019	1 year, 96 days	League	Conte I	
	Luciana Lamorgese (1953– )	5 September 2019	22 October 2022	3 years, 47 days	Independent	Conte II; Draghi	
	Matteo Piantedosi (1963– )	22 October 2022	Incumbent	3 years, 321 days	Independent	Meloni	
