= Ettore Bertolè-Viale =

Italian politician and general

Ettore Bertolè Viale
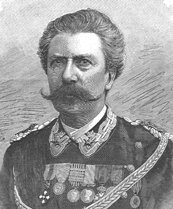

Minister of War
- In office 27 October 1867 – 14 December 1869
- Preceded by: Genova Giovanni Thaon di Revel
- Succeeded by: Giuseppe Govone
- In office 4 April 1887 – 29 July 1887
- Preceded by: Cesare Ricotti-Magnani
- In office 29 July 1887 – 6 February 1891
- Succeeded by: Luigi Pelloux

Senator
- In office 12 June 1881 – 13 November 1892

Chamber of Deputies of the Kingdom of Italy
- In office 10 March 1867 – 2 October 1882

Ettore Bertolè-Viale (Genoa, 25 November 1829 – Turin, 13 November 1892 ) was an Italian general and politician. He was senator of the Kingdom of Italy and Minister of War in the first, second and third Menabrea governments, the eighth Depretis government and the first and second Crispi governments.

== Military career ==
Born into a family with military traditions, he attended the military academy in Turin, graduating in 1844. Appointed Second Lieutenant at eighteen, the following year he became Lieutenant and was enrolled in the 13th infantry regiment, Savona brigade with which he took part in the First Italian War of Independence.

After the end of the war, he resumed his studies and became a General Staff officer. He took part in the Crimean War with the rank of Captain in command of the 2nd provisional brigade of the General Staff and fought at the Battle of the Chernaya. In 1859 he took part in the Second Italian War of Independence with the rank of staff captain, fighting under General Manfredo Fanti. He then took part in the battles of battle of Palestro and battle of Magenta, where he earned the medal for military valor and the knight's cross of the Military Order of Savoy.

After the Armistice of Villafranca, he became secretary to General Fanti, following him in the campaigns in Emilia and Tuscany. In 1860 General Fanti became Minister of War, and Viale was promoted to Lieutenant Colonel and Officer of the Military Order of Savoy. On 13 June 1861, appointed general secretary of the Minister of War, he was shortly afterwards also made a colonel.

In 1866, with the Third Italian War of Independence, he was appointed General Intendant of the army, but since this position had to be held by a general, Bertolè-Viale was promoted to this major-general, thus becoming at 37 years old the youngest general in Italy. He held this rank until 1874 when he became commander of the general staff and then of the Army Corps in 1881, obtaining the rank of aide-de-camp to His Majesty as Lieutenant General.

== Political career ==
In the meantime, in 1867, he was elected to the Chamber of Deputies for the constituency of Crescentino, which he continued to represent for five legislatures. A few months after being elected he was appointed Minister of War, remaining in office until 1869. During this first term of office he was mostly occupied with reforming and strengthening the army, overcoming the weaknesses identified in the Third War of Independence, and making ready for the eventual capture of Rome. However the main reform he worked on - a recruitment bill by which military service was to be made compulsory for all men, but reducing the service period to four years - did not come to fruition because of the fall of the Menabrea ministry.

In 1878, upon the death of king Victor Emmanuel II, Bertolè-Viale was chosen to bring the official announcement of Umberto I's assumption of the throne to Vienna, laying the foundations for the signing of the Triple Alliance.

In 1887 he became war minister for a second time, when King Umberto I appointed him on the advice of Agostino Depretis following the humiliating Italian defeat at the battle of Dogali. Under his prudent leadership the Italian forces were able to regroup and eventually prevail in the Italo-Ethiopian War of 1887–1889, taking Asmara and Keren.

His appointment also came shortly after the renewal of the Triple Alliance. Bertolè-Viale was concerned about the risk of a French invasion, it nevertheless agreed that Italy would send troops to support the German Empire on the Rhine in the event of a French assault.

Having fallen ill, he retired from his politics in 1891 and died in Turin on 13 November 1892 at the age of sixty-three.

== Honours ==
=== Italian honours ===
Grand Cordon of the Order of Saints Maurice and Lazarus - ribbon for ordinary uniform

Grand Cordon of the Order of Saints Maurice and Lazarus

Grand Cordon of the Order of the Crown of Italy - ribbon for ordinary uniform

Grand Cordon of the Order of the Crown of Italy

Officer of the Military Order of Savoy - ribbon for ordinary uniform

Officer of the Military Order of Savoy

Silver Medal of Military Valor - ribbon for ordinary uniform

Silver Medal of Military Valor

=== Foreign honours ===
Grand Cross of the Order of Franz Joseph (Austria-Hungary) - ribbon for ordinary uniform

Grand Cross of the Order of Franz Joseph (Austria-Hungary)

Grand Cross of the Military Order of Aviz (Portugal) - ribbon for ordinary uniform

Grand Cross of the Military Order of Aviz (Portugal)

Knight First Class of the Order of the Medjidie (Ottoman Empire) - ribbon for ordinary uniform

Knight First Class of the Order of the Medjidie (Ottoman Empire)

Knight First Class of the Order of the Red Eagle (German Empire) - ribbon for ordinary uniform

Knight First Class of the Order of the Red Eagle (German Empire)

Gran Croce dell'Ordine di Carlo III (Spagna) - ribbon for ordinary uniform

Grand Cross of the Order of Charles III (Spain)

Cavaliere dell'Ordine dell'Aquila Bianca (Impero di Russia) - ribbon for ordinary uniform

Knight of the Order of the White Eagle (Russian Empire)

Cavaliere di Grande Stella dell'Ordine del Leone e del Sole (Impero persiano) - ribbon for ordinary uniform

Knight of the Order of the Lion and the Sun (Persia)

Cavaliere Gran Commendatore dell'Ordine di Nichan Iftikar (Tunisia) - ribbon for ordinary uniform

Grand Commander of the Order of Glory (Tunisia)

Cavaliere dell'Ordine della Legion d'Onore (Francia) - ribbon for ordinary uniform

Knight of the Legion of Honour (France)

Medaglia inglese della Guerra di Crimea (Regno Unito) - ribbon for ordinary uniform

Crimea Medal (United Kingdom)
