= Laura Beatrice Mancini =

Italian poet (1821–1869)

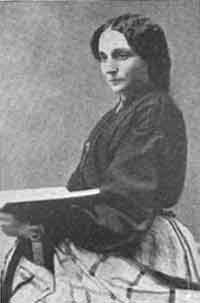
Laura Beatrice Mancini (ca. 1860)

Laura Beatrice Mancini (January 17, 1821 – July 17, 1869), born Laura Beatrice Oliva, was an Italian poet.

Laura Oliva was born in Naples, and in 1840 married Italian jurist and statesman Pasquale Stanislao Mancini. She wrote a variety of poetry, and ran a literary salon for liberal-minded Neapolitans from the 1840s. Many of her poems focused on contemporary political events (see Italian unification), especially after 1860.

== Works ==
- Ines (1845)
- Colombo al convento della Rabida (1846)
- Poesie varie (1848)
- L'Italia sulla tomba di Vincenzo Gioberti (1853)
- Patria ed amore (1874)
