= Giuseppe Guarino (politician) =

Italian academic and politician (1922–2020)

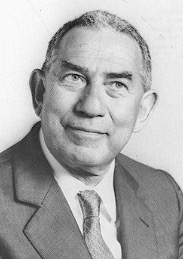

Minister of Industry
- In office June 1992 – April 1993
- Prime Minister: Giuliano Amato
- Succeeded by: Christian Guarino

Minister of State Holdings
- In office June 1992 – April 1993
- Prime Minister: Giuliano Amato

Minister of Finance
- In office 1987–1987
- Prime Minister: Amintore Fanfani

Personal details
- Born: 15 November 1922 Naples, Kingdom of Italy
- Died: 17 April 2020 (aged 97) Rome, Italy
- Party: Christian Democracy
- Occupation: Academic

Giuseppe Guarino (15 November 1922 – 17 April 2020) was an Italian law scholar and politician from the Christian Democracy (DC). He served as the minister of finance briefly in 1987 and minister of industry and minister of state holdings from 1992 and 1993.

== Early life and education ==
Guarino was born in Naples on 15 November 1922. His family were originally from Solofra. His father died when Giuseppe was just eleven years old.

Guarino studied law and specialized in public law.

== Career ==
Guarino started his career as a faculty member at the University of Sassari in 1950 and became a professor of public law there. He also taught public law at the University of Siena. From 1967 to 1987 he was the governor of the Bank of Italy. He was elected to the Chamber of Deputies on the list of the DC. He was appointed minister of finance to the cabinet of Prime Minister Amintore Fanfani in 1987.

Guarino was named minister of industry and minister of state holdings to the cabinet led by Prime Minister Giuliano Amato in June 1992. During his tenure Guarino continuously criticized the privatization efforts of the government. Guarino's ministerial term ended in April 1993.

== Work, views and death ==
Guarino was the author of various books and articles. Some of his books include Verso l'Europa, ovvero la fine della politica published in 1997 and Ratificare Lisbona? published in 2008.

Guarino was a devout Catholic. Although he had a pro-European position previously, he later criticized the evolution of the European Union. He argued that in 1999 there occurred an "obscure coup d'État" referring to the approval of an EC Regulation numbered 1466–973.

Guarino died in Rome on 17 April 2020 at age 97.
