= Andrea Del Santo =

Italian politician and admiral (1830–1905)

Andrea Carlo Agostino Del Santo
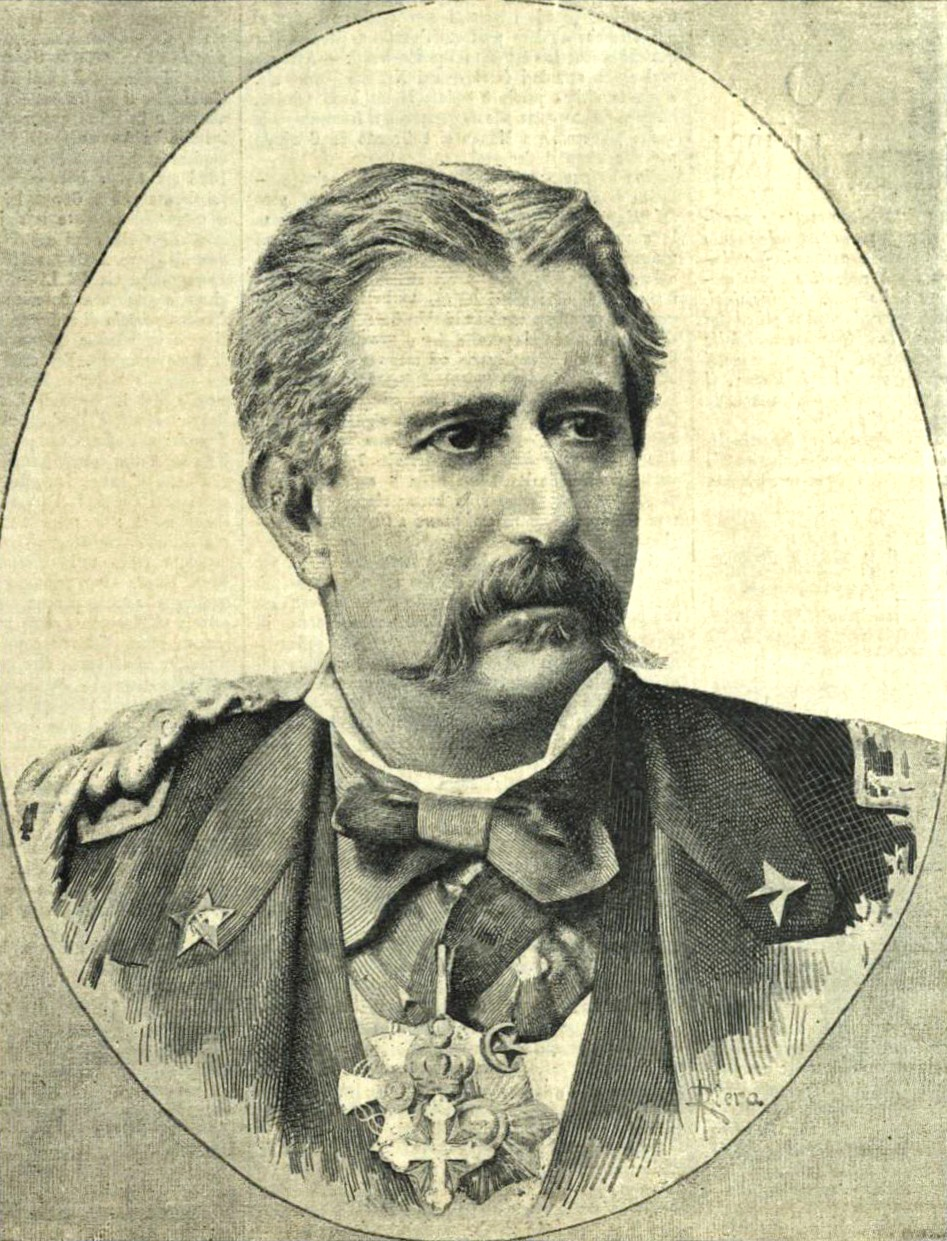

Minister of the Navy
- In office 17 November 1883 – 30 March 1884
- Preceded by: Ferdinando Acton
- Succeeded by: Benedetto Brin

Member of the Chamber of Deputies
- In office 28 January 1884 – 27 April 1886

Andrea Carlo Agostino Del Santo (Genoa, 16 October 1830 – Genoa, 7 February 1905) was an Italian admiral and politician who briefly served as Minister of the Navy of the Kingdom of Italy.

== Early life and Sardinian Royal Navy ==
Andrea was the son of Angelo Del Santo, a general of the Kingdom of Sardinia and his wife Rosa Millelire. He studied at the Sardinian Royal Navy School in Genoa, graduating on 20 April 1848 with the rank of ensign. He took part in the First Italian War of Independence with the Royal Sardinian Navy on board the frigate San Michele, blockading Trieste, bombarding Austrian forts near Venice, and intercepting Austrian merchant ships. Promoted to second lieutenant in June 1850, he was sent on the brig Colombo to Montevideo. where he took command of the armed schooner Generoso and from August to October 1851 was involved in the protection of Sardinian subjects in Uruguay during the Platine War.

Promoted to lieutenant in July 1855, he served in the Sardinian expeditionary corps in the Crimean War. In 1859 he was sent to the Adriatic Sea again under the command of Edoardo Tholosano to attack Venice, but the Armistice of Villafranca was signed before the action began.

== Italian Royal Navy ==
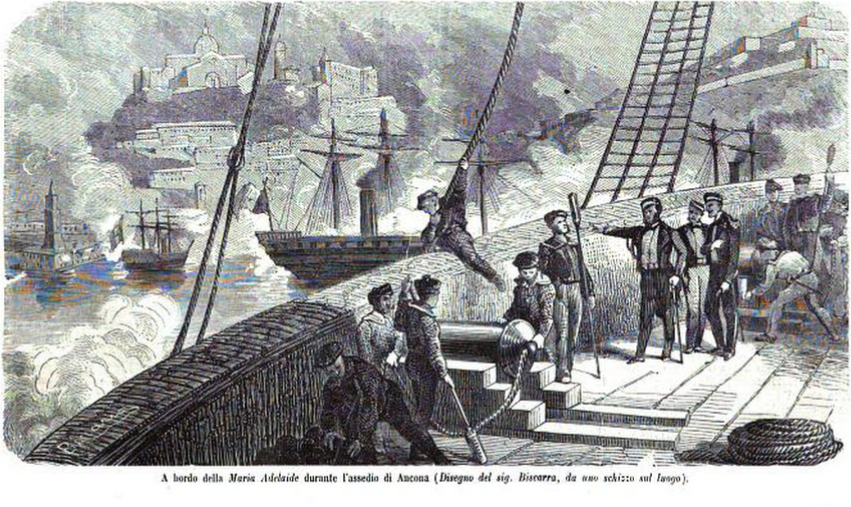
The Maria Adelaide at the siege of Ancona

Serving aboard the steam frigate Maria Adelaide, he earned a Silver Medal for Military Valor during the bombardment of the Ancona artillery batteries under Carlo Pellion di Persano, and an honourable mention at Mola di Gaeta (Formia), where the Sardinian ships supported troops crossing the Garigliano. Soon after, in command of the aviso Ichnusa he was responsible for monitoring the movements of Giuseppe Garibaldi, who had retreated to the island of Caprera. In 1860 he took part in the Siege of Gaeta and was promoted to frigate captain in 1861.

the Re d’Italia sinking after being rammed at Lissa

In 1864, Del Santo was made an Officer of the Order of Saints Maurice and Lazarus for his role in rescuing the steamer Re Galantuomo, which had been damaged by storms. He chartered the steamer Northern Star, to join the international search for the ship, which was feared lost in the Atlantic Ocean with 400 people on board, and spent 11 days looking for it. It eventually was found and returned safely to Naples.

In 1866, as Admiral Carlo Pellion di Persano's deputy chief of staff, he took part in the Battle of Lissa aboard the ironclad Re d'Italia. After the ship was rammed and began to sink he continued to fight and threw himself into the water only a few moments before she went down. Clinging to a makeshift raft of debris, he was spotted just before nightfall and picked up by a launch from the steam frigate Principe Umberto. He later was called to testify at the Senate trial of Admiral Persano.

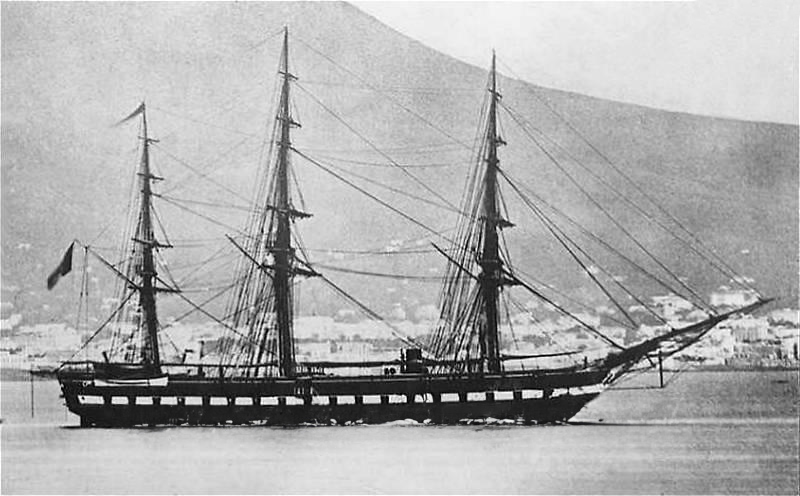
the Garibaldi

Del Santo was promoted to captain in December 1867 and assigned to supervise the scientific and technical education of Prince Tommaso, Duke of Genoa. With Del Santo in command, the prince on board as an ensign, and the botanist Federico Delpino leading the scientific work, the frigate Giuseppe Garibaldi left Naples on 16 November 1872 to circumnavigate the globe. The voyage took 705 days. After a stop in Gibraltar, the ship headed for Rio de Janeiro, from where, rounding the Cape of Good Hope, it arrived in Australia. From there, passing near Fiji, it arrived in Japan in August 1873. After two months in Japanese waters, Giuseppe Garibaldi resumed her journey towards San Francisco. From there she then stopped in Callao and Valparaíso, rounded Cape Horn, and arrived in Montevideo before making for La Spezia.

On his return Del Santo assumed new duties. He had already served as commander of the second division of the naval school and was now appointed commander-in-chief of the maritime department of Naples. In 1878 he became aide-de-camp to King Umberto I. Later general secretary at the Ministry of the Navy, he became the first commander of the new Naval Academy of Livorno in November 1881. He was promoted to rear admiral in 1877 and then to vice admiral on 17 November 1883 at the same time as he was made Minister of the Navy.

== Ministerial career ==
Del Santo had never been elected to the Parliament of the Kingdom of Italy and had no links to any political party. This allowed Prime Minister Agostino Depretis to bring him into the Council of Ministers so as to dissipate the political tensions attracted by his predecessor Ferdinando Acton. Partly for reasons of economy and partly because he wanted to scale up Italy's navy rapidly, Acton had focused on building up a force of small, fast, and affordable ships. His persistent critics Benedetto Brin and Simone Antonio Saint-Bon urged the building of large battleships instead. Eventually the polemic against Acton became unbearable, and he resigned.

Del Santo hesitated to take his place, and did nothing to attract controversy during the brief months in which he served in the Council of Ministers. In order to serve he ran for office in a by-election in Genoa on 16 December 1883 and was sworn in on 28 January 1884. His uneventful tenure as minister ended in March 1884 when the government resigned; when Depretis immediately formed his sixth government, he gave Benedetto Brin the navy portfolio. Del Santo remained in the Chamber of Deputies until 1886. He was nominated as a Senator of the Kingdom of Italy in 1890 but never took his oath of office or served as such.
