= Enrico Pessina =

Italian philosopher, lawyer and politician (1828–1916)

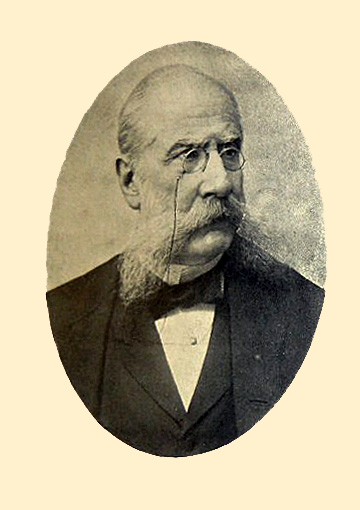

Minister of Justice
- In office 24 November 1884 – 29 June 1885
- Preceded by: Niccolò Ferracciu
- Succeeded by: Diego Tajani

Minister of Agriculture, Industry and Commerce
- In office 10 November 1878 – 19 December 1878
- Preceded by: Benedetto Cairoli
- Succeeded by: Salvatore Majorana Calatabiano

Senator
- In office 16 March 1879 – 24 September 1916

Member of the Chamber of Deputies

Enrico Pessina (Naples, 17 October 1828 – Naples, 24 September 1916) was an Italian jurist, philosopher and politician. He was senator of the Kingdom of Italy in the XIII legislature.

== Biography ==
He completed both legal and philosophical studies at the University of Naples. He was a student of the Calabrian philosopher Pasquale Galluppi, for whom he edited the posthumous edition of the "History of Philosophy", a year after his death.

A man of liberal ideas, he was an opponent of the Bourbons, taking part in the riots of 1848. The following year he published his Manual of Constitutional Law which earned him police persecution and then prison. In 1856 he married Giulia Settembrini, daughter of Luigi Settembrini, at the time of the marriage secluded on Santo Stefano Island. In 1860 Pessina fled the Kingdom and resided in Livorno, only to be appointed professor of law at the University of Bologna the following year.

With the fall of the Bourbons, he returned to Naples where he was deputy general prosecutor. Deputy from 1861 and then Senator of the Kingdom of Italy from 1876, he was minister of Agriculture, Industry and Commerce in the first Cairoli government (1878) and Minister of Justice in the sixth Depretis government (1884-1885). he also served as Vice-President of the Senate on a number of occasions (13 November 1887 – 3 August 1890) (7 December 1890 – 27 September 1892) (21 November 1892 – 13 January 1895) (2 June 1895 – 2 March 1897) (10 November 1898 – 17 May 1900).

In 1875 he founded the legal magazine Il Filangieri with it:Federico Persico.

In 1899 he became a member of the Accademia dei Lincei and in 1914 he became President of the Royal Society for the Promotion of the Natural Sciences of Naples.

He died in 1916 in his home in via del Museo Nazionale, a street that later took his name: via Enrico Pessina. Even the palace where he lived and died has since been remembered with his name.

One of the 229 busts of illustrious Italians that adorn the Pincio promenade in Rome is dedicated to him.

== Honours ==
Cavaliere di Gran Croce decorato di Gran Cordone dell'Ordine dei Santi Maurizio e Lazzaro - ribbon for ordinary uniform

Grand Cordon of the order of Saints Maurice and Lazarus

Cavaliere di Gran Croce decorato di Gran Cordone dell'Ordine della Corona d'Italia - ribbon for ordinary uniform

Grand Cordon of the Order of the Crown of Italy

Cavaliere BAR

Knight of the Military Order of Savoy

Ordine Civile di Savoia BAR

Knight of the Civil Order of Savoy
