= Niccolò Ferracciu =

Italian lawyer and politician

Nicolò Ferracciu
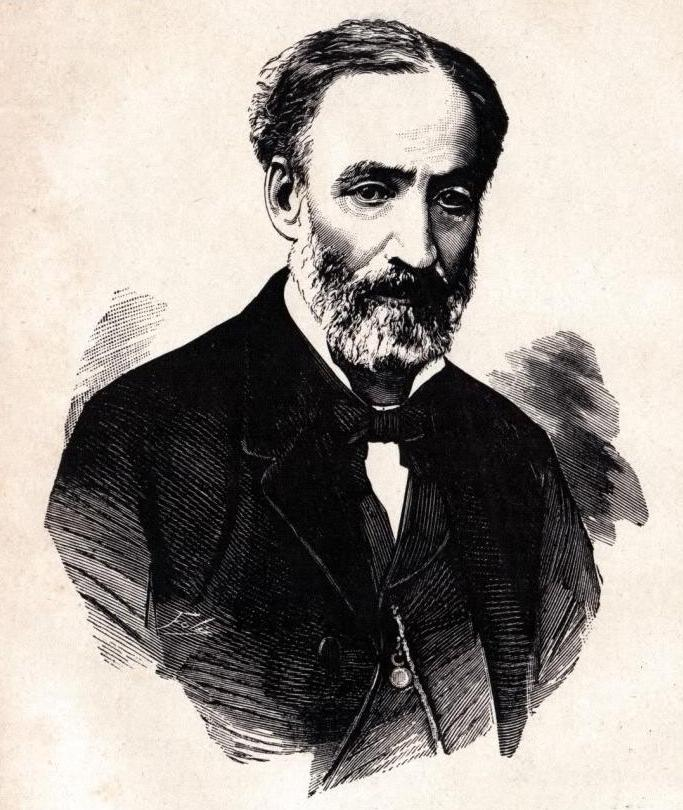

Member of the Sardinian Parliament
- In office 1 February 1849 – 17 December 1860

Member of the Chamber of Deputies
- In office 18 February 1861 – 20 September 1874
- In office 20 November 1876 – 2 March 1892

Minister of the Navy
- In office 19 December 1878 – 14 July 1879
- Preceded by: Benedetto Brin
- Succeeded by: Cesare Bonelli

Minister of Justice
- In office 30 March 1884 – 24 November 1884
- Preceded by: Bernardino Giannuzzi Savelli
- Succeeded by: Enrico Pessina

Niccolò Ferracciu (Calangianus, 10 May 1815 – Rome, 2 March 1892) was an Italian lawyer and politician. He served as Minister of the Navy and Minister of Justice of the Kingdom of Italy.

== Biography ==
Born in Calangianus on 10 May 1815 to Antonio Ferracciu and Lucia Mossa, Niccolò Ferracciu attended high school in Tempio Pausania. After graduating in Literature in Tempio he went to Sassari for university studies where he graduated in Law in 1836, soon becoming one of the most sought-after Sardinian lawyers, and in 1850 he was appointed professor of economics and commercial law. In 1848 he was elected as Divisional and Municipal Councilor of Sassari, while in 1851 he became President of the Divisional and then Provincial Council. Consequently to this position, following the granting of the Statuto Albertino in 1848, he was elected to the Subalpine Parliament for the constituency of Sassari on 15 January 1849.

In the Subalpine Parliament he sided with the left and immediately opposed the armistice of Novara, considering it an attack on the standing and honor of Italy. In 1852 he took the side of the Chamber against the state of siege decreed by the government in the province of Sassari, while in 1855 when cholera broke out in the city he distinguished himself in his constant activity aimed at combating the epidemic.

In 1860 he took a stand against the cession of Nice and Savoy to France. During his years in politics he was secretary and member of several parliamentary committees and committees, participating in all the legislatures first of the Sardinian Kingdom, then of the young Kingdom of Italy.

In 1861 he commanded the battalion of the national guard of Sassari. Thanks to the good relations established with the local people he was elected as their deputy in the XI legislature. In Parliament he sided with the moderate Left. When in 1865 Giovanni Lanza invited him to take the Ministry of Public Education, he refused as he did not consider it right for him to serve in that government. Vice President of the Chamber from 1871 to 1874 and again from 1891 to 1892, Ferracciu eventually held various government positions, first as Minister of the Navy (1878–1879) and then as Ministr of Justice (March - November 1884), both under Depretis governments. Ferracciu remained in Parliament after his ministerial career was over and died during his last mandate, on 2 March 1892, in Rome, aged 76.
