= Federico Seismit-Doda =

Dalmatian Italian politician (1825–1893)

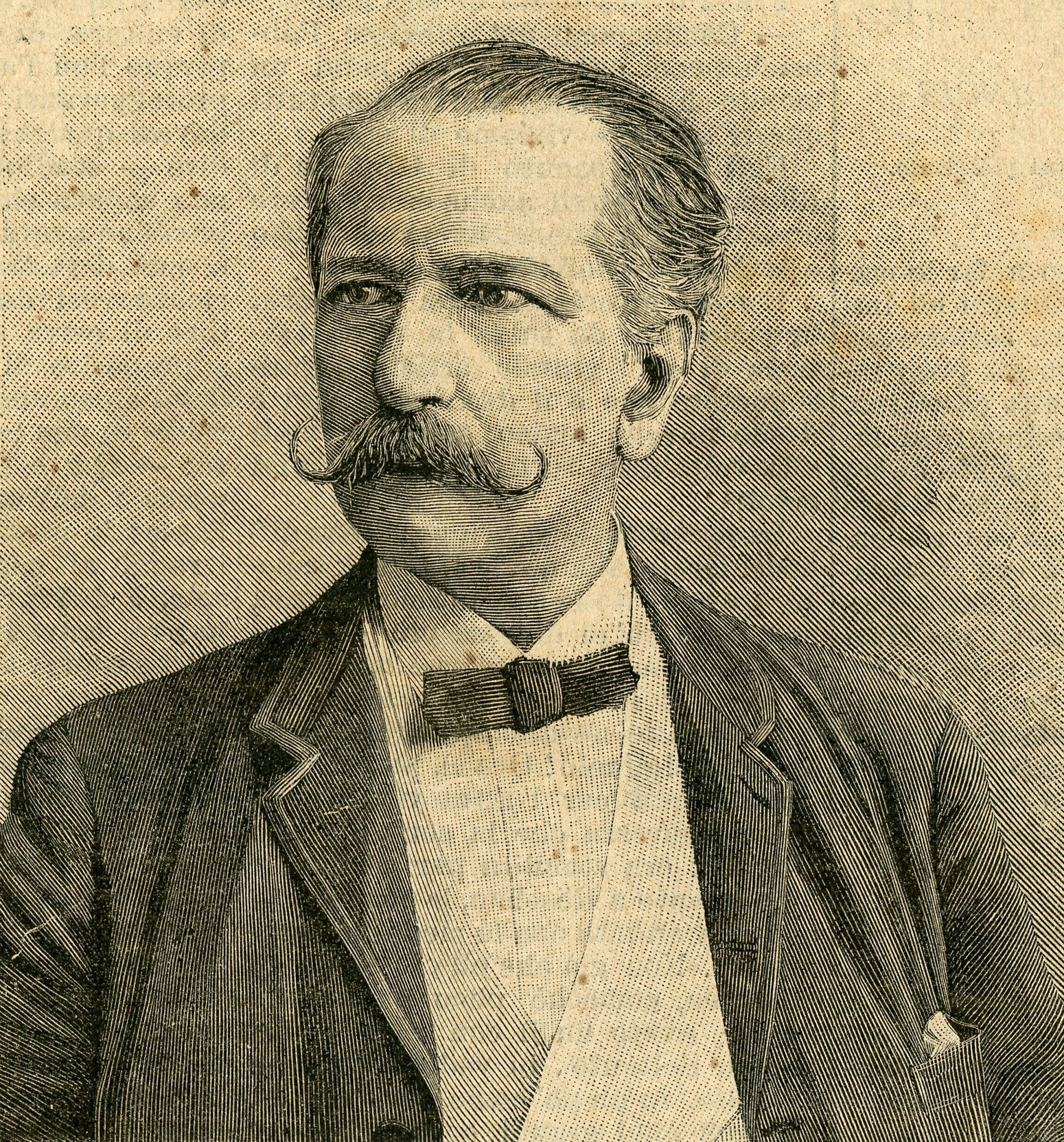
Federico Seismit-Doda

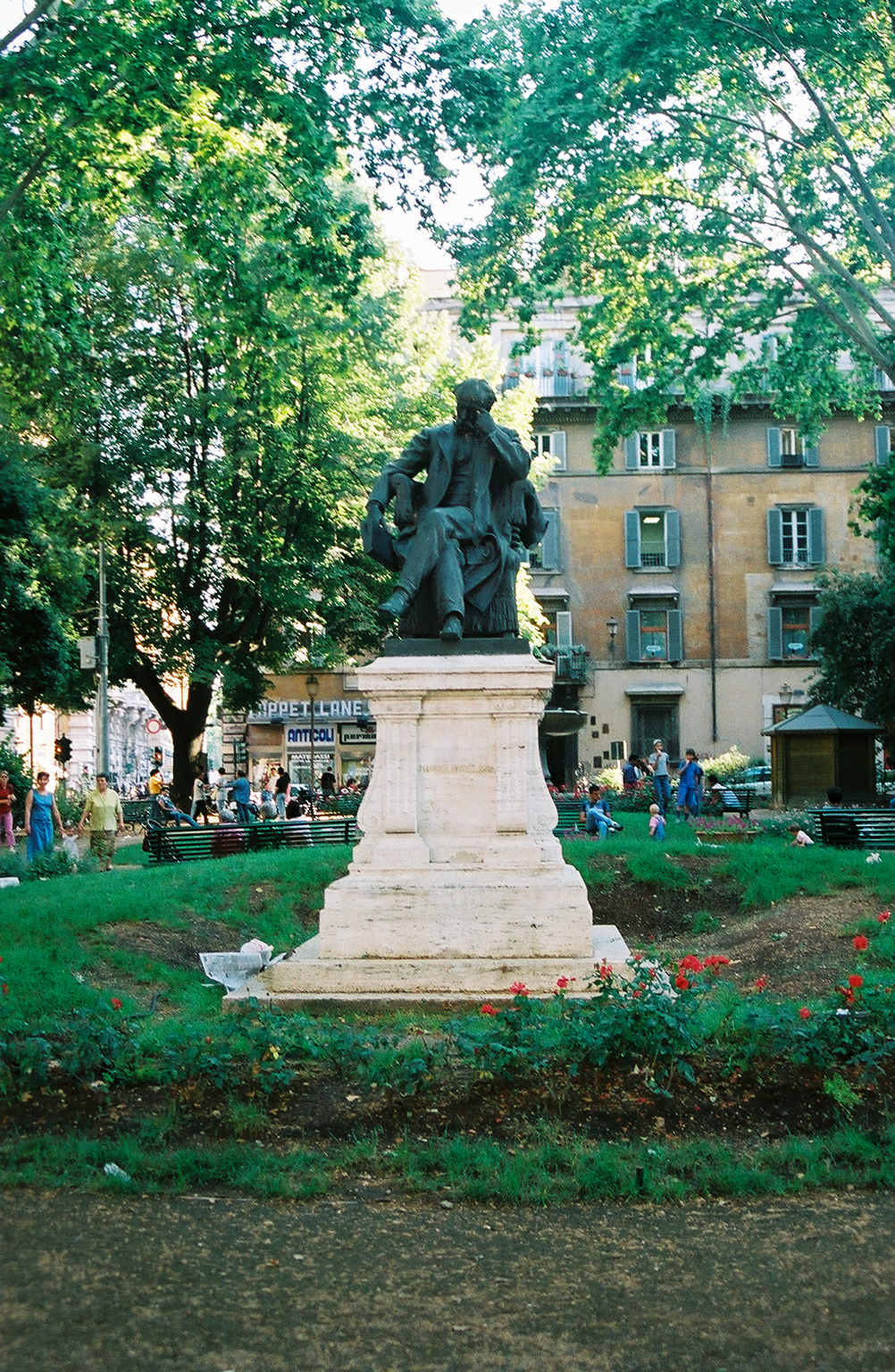
Seismit-Doda's monument in Rome

Federico Seismit-Doda (1825–1893) was a Dalmatian Italian politician who gained prominence during the Revolutions of 1848 in the Italian states.

Frederico Seismit-Doda was born in Ragusa (Dubrovnik) in the Kingdom of Dalmatia (today's Croatia). His family was an Albanian from the Doda tribe of Mirditë. He graduated from the University of Padua and collaborated at Caffè Pedrocchi; in 1849 fought with the volunteers in Veneto and in 1849 participated in the defence of Roman Republic. After exile to Greece and to Piedmont in 1850, he collaborated in various newspapers and magazines, and published a volume of his memories Venetian Volunteers.

He died in Rome.
