= Luigi Miceli =

Italian politician

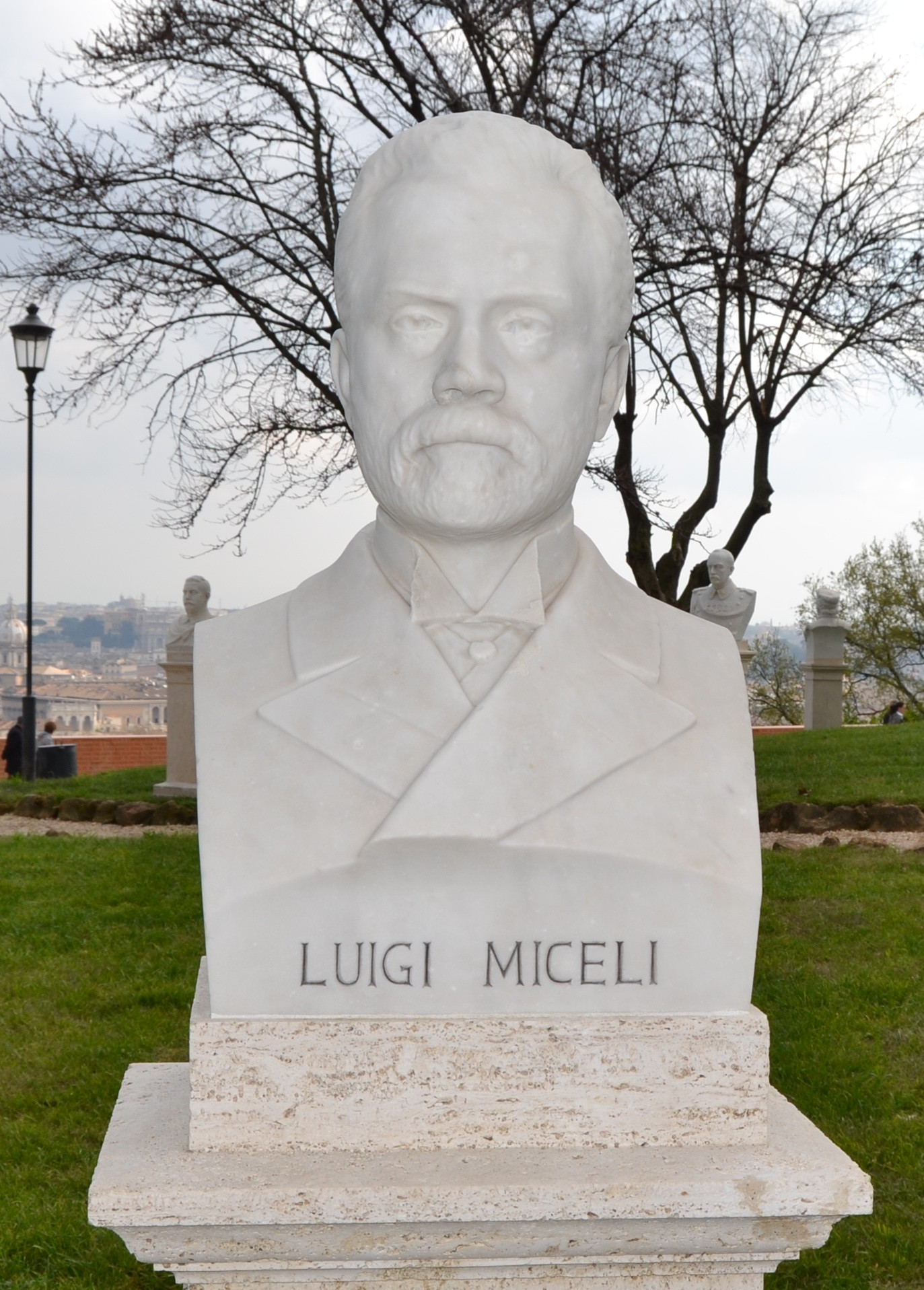
bust of Miceli, in the gardens of the Janiculum

Luigi Miceli (7 June 1824 in Longobardi, Kingdom of the Two Sicilies – 30 December 1906, in Rome), was an Italian patriot, politician and a military figure, a capitan in the conflicts of the Risorgimento and a leading military figure to the Italian Liberation and Unification in 1861.

== Biography ==
Luigi Miceli was a young 22-year-old lawyer when he became a member of Giovane Italia (1844), he was the leading figure in the preparation to the Calabrian insurrection in 1847 and 1848. The same year (in 1848) The Calabrian insurrection failed, and he escaped at first to Rome and later to Genoa under the protection of The Republica Romana (1849). He was condemned to death in absentia at his trial in 1854.

Before the Liberation of Italy in 1861, he became a member of the Società nazionale italiana, and participated at the second war of independence with the Cacciatori delle Alpi. He was at the right hand of Garibaldi at Varese and San Fermo (1859). In 1860, he was among the leading organisers and a capitan of the Expedition of the Thousand. He led the occupation of Palermo. Soon after The Unification of Italy he became a politician, and in 1878 he became minister of Agriculture and later Minister of Industry and Commerce and a Senator.

== Bibliography ==
- Luca Addante, "Luigi Miceli (1824–1906)" in Cosenza e i cosentini: un volo lungo tre millenni. Soveria Mannelli: Rubbettino Editore, 2001, pp. 86–87, ISBN 88-498-0127-0, ISBN 978-88-498-0127-9.
