= Pasquale Stanislao Mancini =

Italian politician (1817–1888)

Pasquale Mancini
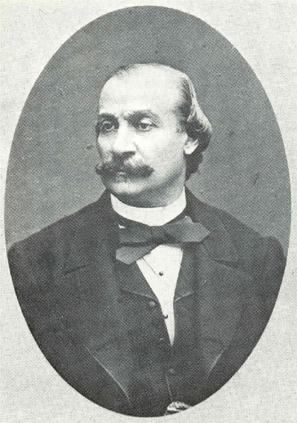

Minister of Foreign Affairs
- In office 29 May 1881 – 29 June 1885
- Prime Minister: Agostino Depretis
- Preceded by: Benedetto Cairoli
- Succeeded by: Carlo Felice Nicolis

Minister of Justice
- In office 25 March 1876 – 24 March 1878
- Prime Minister: Agostino Depretis
- Preceded by: Paolo Onorato Vigliani
- Succeeded by: Raffaele Conforti

Minister of Public Education
- In office 4 March 1862 – 31 March 1862
- Prime Minister: Urbano Rattazzi
- Preceded by: Francesco de Sanctis
- Succeeded by: Carlo Matteucci

Member of the Italian Chamber of Deputies
- In office 18 February 1861 – 26 December 1888
- Constituency: Naples

Personal details
- Born: Pasquale Stanislao Mancini; 17 March 1817 Castel Baronia, Kingdom of the Two Sicilies
- Died: 26 December 1888 (aged 71) Naples, Kingdom of Italy
- Party: Historical Left
- Spouse(s): Laura Beatrice Mancini (m. 1840–1869); her death
- Children: 11 children
- Education: University of Naples Federico II
- Profession: Jurist, statesman

Pasquale Stanislao Mancini, 8th Marquess of Fusignano (17 March 1817 – 26 December 1888) was an Italian jurist and statesman.

== Early life ==
Mancini was born in Castel Baronia, in the Kingdom of the Two Sicilies (present-day Province of Avellino). He became well established in intellectual circles in Naples, editing and publishing a number of newspapers and journals, and gained a reputation in law after the 1841 publication of his correspondence with Terenzio Mamiani on the right to punish. He did not attend university, but rather was educated privately, and was granted a law degree in 1844 by a special exemption.

== Career ==
In 1848, he was instrumental in persuading Ferdinand II to participate in the war against Austria. Twice he declined the offer of a portfolio in the Neapolitan cabinet, and upon the triumph of the reactionary party, undertook the defence of the Liberal political prisoners.

Threatened with imprisonment in his turn, he fled to Piedmont, where he obtained a professorship at the University of Turin and became preceptor of the crown prince Humbert. In 1860 he prepared the legislative unification of Italy, opposed the idea of an alliance between Piedmont and Naples, and, after the fall of the Bourbons, was sent to Naples as administrator of justice, in which capacity he suppressed the religious institutes, revoked the Concordat, proclaimed the right of the state to Church property, and unified civil and commercial jurisprudence.

In 1862, he became minister of public instruction in the Rattazzi cabinet, and induced the Chamber to abolish capital punishment. Thereafter, for fourteen years, he devoted himself chiefly to questions of international law and arbitration, but in 1876, upon the advent of the Left to power, became minister of justice in the Depretis cabinet. His Liberalism found expression in the extension of press freedom, the repeal of imprisonment for debt, and the abolition of ecclesiastical tithes.

During the Conclave of 1878 he succeeded, by negotiations with Cardinal Pecci (afterwards Leo XIII), in inducing the Sacred College to remain in Rome, and, after the election of the new pope, arranged for his temporary absence from the Vatican for the purpose of settling private business. Resigning office in March 1878, he resumed the practice of law and secured the annulment of Garibaldi's marriage. The fall of Cairoli led to Mancini's appointment (1881) to the ministry of foreign affairs in the Depretis administration. The growing desire in Italy for alliance with Austria and Germany did not at first secure his approval; nevertheless, he accompanied King Humbert to Vienna and conducted the negotiations which led to the informal acceptance of the Triple Alliance.

His desire to retain French confidence was the chief motive of his refusal in July 1882 to share in the British expedition to Egypt, but, finding his efforts fruitless when the existence of the Triple Alliance came to be known, he veered to the English interest and obtained assent in London to the Italian expedition to Massawa. An indiscreet announcement of the limitations of the Triple Alliance contributed to his fall in June 1885, when he was succeeded by Count di Robilant.

== Personal life ==
He married poet Laura Beatrice Mancini in 1840, and she ran a literary salon for liberal-minded Neapolitans out of their house. His daughter Rosa married Teodorico Bonacci, who was himself twice Minister of Justice, and their daughter Anna Bonacci was a famous writer and actress.

== Death ==
He died in Naples in December 1888.

== Works ==
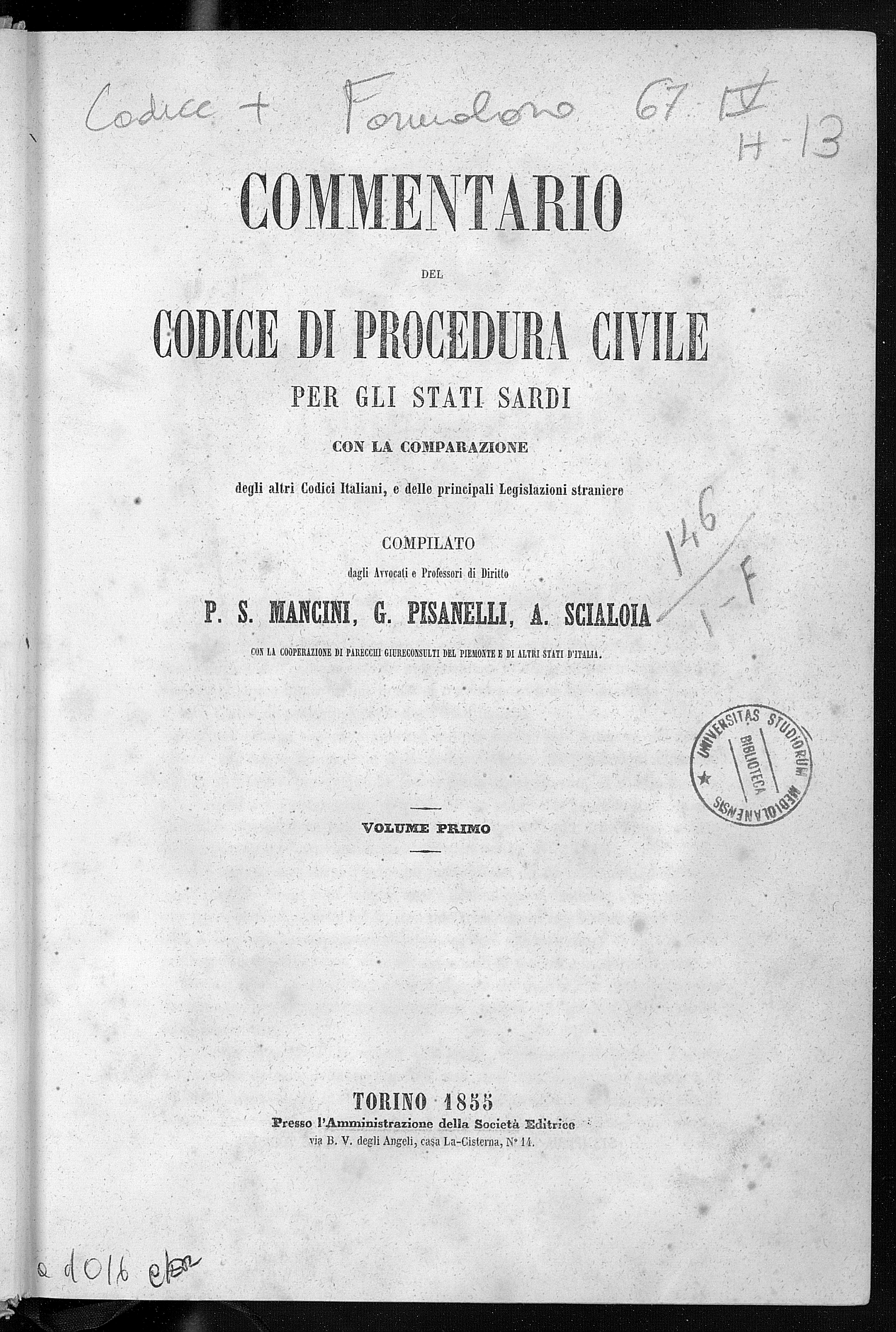
Commentario del Codice di procedura civile per gli Stati sardi, 1855

- Commentario del Codice di procedura civile per gli Stati sardi (in Italian). Torino: UTET. 1855.
