= Bernardino Grimaldi =

Italian politician (1839–1897)

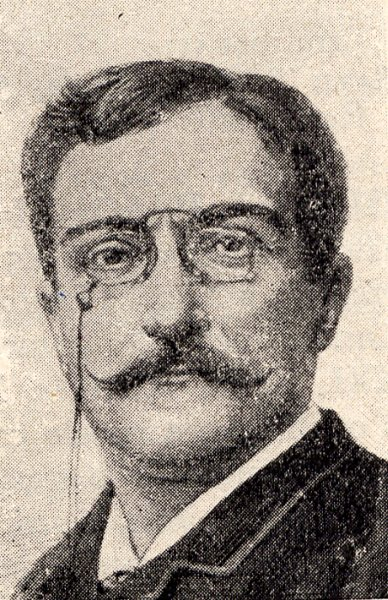

Personal details
- Born: 15 February 1839; Catanzaro, Kingdom of the Two Sicilies
- Died: 16 March 1897 (aged 58); Rome, Italy
- Political party: Historical Left

Bernardino Grimaldi (15 February 1839 – 16 March 1897) was an Italian politician. He was a Minister in several governments.

== Early years ==
He was born in Catanzaro (Calabria). His father Luigi Grimaldi was the author of several monographs on the economic state of the province. Like his mother Beatrice Marincola Pistoia, both were descendants of noble families. After earning his law degree, he devoted himself to practice law and teaching constitutional law.

In November 1876, he was elected as a deputy for Catanzaro, which constituency he would represent until his death (XIII-XIX legislatures). He joined the Historical Left. Grimaldi was among the most prominent examples of the new political class that would advocate various reforms as well as state intervention in the economy and in the resolution of regional problems.

== In government ==
Grimaldi served a long career in key ministries. At the age of 40, he became Italian Minister of Finance and Minister of the Treasury in the second government of Benedetto Cairoli (14 July to 25 November 1879). His first mandate was particularly difficult because of the tax on casting grain and cereals that particularly affected the poor, but also was the main economic revenue of the country. Cairoli wanted to abolish the tax to please voters, but Grimaldi opposed saying that abolishing the tax would cause new tax increases.

In 1879, he also supported the proposed construction of 6,000 kilometres (3,700 miles) of new railway lines across the Kingdom of Italy that would be realized in the early 1880s. He became Minister of Agriculture, Industry and Commerce under Prime Minister Agostino Depretis (30 March 1884 – 29 December 1888). In 1886, he assured the legal recognition of mutual aid societies in Italy, and a law against labour exploitation of women and children as well as recognition of the dangers of working conditions. Grimaldi also improved the working conditions of farmers in southern Italy and passed a law on agricultural credit.

== Banca Romana scandal ==
He was Minister of Finance under Prime Minister Francesco Crispi (9 March 1889 and from 9 December 1890 to 6 February 1891, and continued as Minister of Finance and Minister of the Treasury in the first government of Giovanni Giolitti (7 July 1892 to 28 November 1893).

His friendship with the governor of the Banca Romana, Bernardo Tanlongo, and the granting of loans by the bank to some friends, as well as the presentation of a bill – endorsed by Giolitti and then withdrawn – aimed at providing the existing banks the right to issue currency for another six years, were incriminating evidence of his involvement in the Banca Romana scandal. Tanlongo accused Giolitti of receiving money through Grimaldi.

However, the succeeding parliamentary inquiry excluded in November 1893 that Grimaldi had received more money from the Roman Bank than he had admitted to have received as compensation for his professional services. The inquiry also exonerated him from the charge of having collected, directly or indirectly, amounts of money during the parliamentary elections. Nevertheless, his reputation was compromised, even after he left the government, and particularly when the contents of documents submitted by Giolitti to the Chamber of Deputies were made public in December 1894. Notes of the Banca Romana cashier implicated Prime Minister Crispi (with several drafts and a note for 1,050,000 lire), as well as Grimaldi and other ex-Ministers.

== Serious illness ==
Grimaldi was re-elected for the last time in 1895, but had to leave office in 1897, hit by a serious illness rendering him voiceless. He died in Rome on 16 March 1897.
