= Agostino Magliani =

Italian politician (1824–1891)

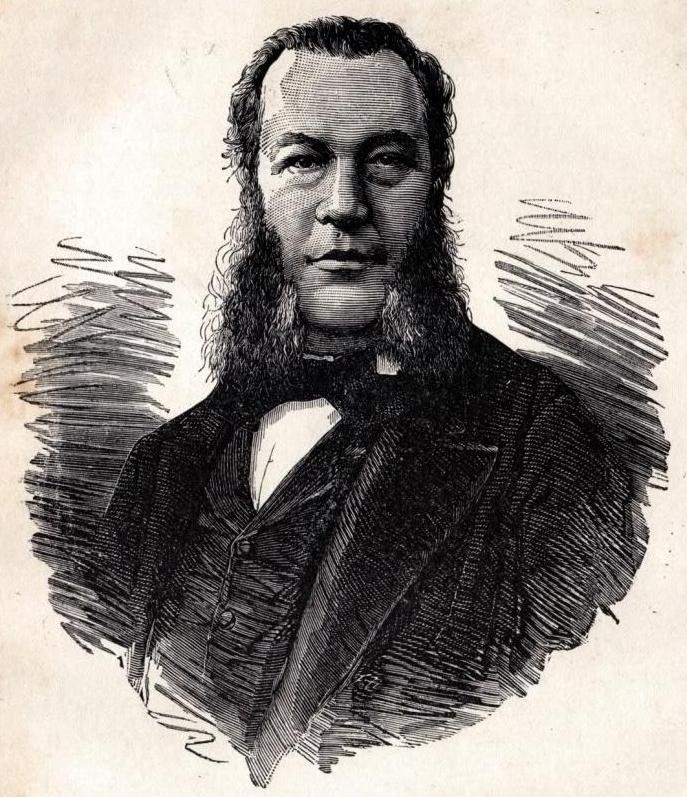
Agostino Magliani

Agostino Magliani (23 July 1824 – 20 February 1891), Italian financier, was a native of Laurino, near Salerno.

He studied at Naples, and a book on the philosophy of law based on Liberal principles won for him a post in the Neapolitan treasury. He entered the Italian Senate in 1871, and had already secured a reputation as a financial expert before his Questione monetaria appeared in 1874.

In December 1877 he became Italian Minister of Finance in the reconstructed Depretis ministry, and he subsequently held the same office in three other Liberal cabinets. In his second tenure he carried through (1880) the abolition of the grist tax, to take effect in 1884. Having to face an increased expenditure without offending the Radical electorate by unpopular taxes, he had recourse to unsound methods of finance, which seriously embarrassed Italian credit for some years after he finally laid down office in 1888. He died in Rome on 22 February 1891. He was one of the founders of the anti-socialistic Adam Smith Society at Florence.
