= Coriolano Ponza di San Martino =

Italian general and politician (1842–1926)

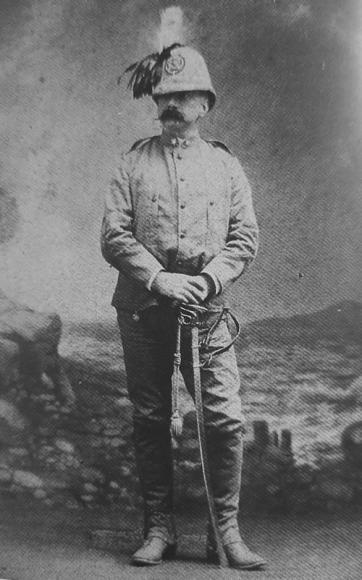

Senator
- In office 8 April 1900 – 6 January 1926

Minister of War
- In office 7 April 1900 – 24 June 1900
- Preceded by: Luigi Pelloux
- In office 24 June 1900 – 15 February 1901
- In office 15 February 1901 – 27 April 1902
- Succeeded by: Enrico Morin

Personal details
- Born: 9 October 1842 Turin, Province of Turin, Sardinia–Piedmont
- Died: 6 January 1926 (aged 83) Cuneo, Piedmont, Italy

Military service
- Allegiance: Kingdom of Sardinia; Kingdom of Italy
- Branch: Royal Sardinian Army; Kingdom of Italy
- Years of service: 1860–1909; 1915–1918
- Rank: Tenente Generale
- Battles/wars: Third Italian War of Independence: Battle of Custoza; Italo-Ethiopian War of 1887–1889; Boxer Rebellion; World War I

Coriolano Ponza di San Martino (Turin, 9 October 1842 – Cuneo, 6 January 1926) was an Italian general and politician. He was a senator of the Kingdom and served as Minister of War in the Pelloux II, Saracco and Zanardelli governments.

== Early life to 1866 ==
Coriolano was the son of Gustavo Ponza di San Martino, senator of the Kingdom of Sardinia and of the Kingdom of Italy and Minister of the Interior in the first Cavour government. He was also the nephew of Coriolano Malingri di Bagnolo. His younger brother Cesare Ponza di San Martino was also a general and senator of the Kingdom of Italy.

He entered the Turin Military Academy and graduated with the rank of sergeant at the age of fifteen, too young to be an officer. He was promoted to second lieutenant in 1860, lieutenant in 1862, and captain in 1866. After serving in the Artillery General Staff he took part in the Third Italian War of Independence as commander of the 1st Section (6th Battery) of the 5th Field Artillery Regiment, earning a Medal of Military Valor in the battle of Custoza.

== Military theory 1866-1882 ==
Ponza di San Martino made a careful study of the Franco-Prussian War of 1870-1871. In 1874 he published a monograph entitled "Studies on the conduct of troops and second line services" (“Studi sulla condotta delle truppe e sui servizi di seconda linea”) which marked his espousal of Prussian-German military doctrine. With that monograph he anticipated the great debate of the following decade over mobilization: a strong proponent of the need for Italy to take an offensive posture, he highlighted the inadequacy of the national recruitment system and the railway network, calling for its strengthening and expansion in view of the concentration of troops in the Po Valley. In 1875, also due to the success achieved by his book, Ponza di San Martino became a logistics instructor at the it:Military School in Turin. Two years later he was promoted to the rank of major of the General Staff Corps and sent to the Territorial General Staff, employed from 1879 in the General Staff of the Genoa Division.

== General Staff 1882-1887 ==
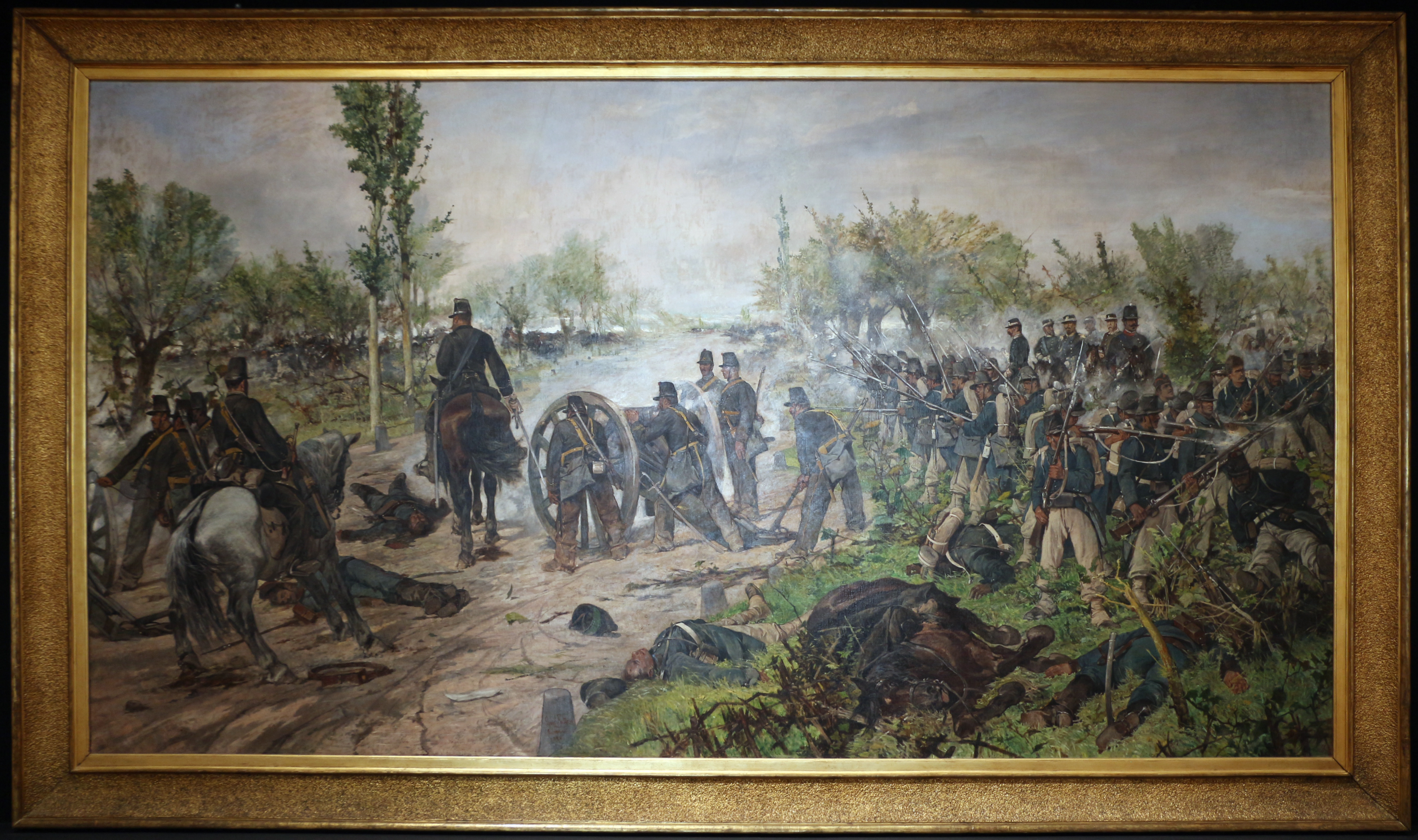
Painting of the battle of Custoza. Coriolano Ponza Di San Martino is the mounted officer with his sword drawn.

In 1882 he was invited to join the Artillery and Engineers Committee of the General Staff. He was first a member and then chief of the General Staff Division. The General Staff Division was directly dependent on the secretary general of the Ministry of War and acted as a military operations office with the task of implementing the plans prepared by the Command of the General Staff Corps. As a collaborator of the minister Emilio Ferrero and the general secretary Luigi Pelloux, Ponza di San Martino contributed to the planning and establishment of the new Army system, responding to the need to increase Italy’s "strategic power". From this period dates his close alignment with the so-called Cult of the offensive.

In 1885 he was first head of office C (library, history and archives) at the II Department of the General Staff and then posted in Berlin with the Italian Embassy. On behalf of Army Chief of Staff Enrico Cosenz, he worked closely with Lieutenant Commander Augusto Aubry to develop joint Royal Army and Royal Navy offensive plans against France. He was promoted to colonel in 1886.

== North Africa 1887-1890 ==
He took part in the Eritrean expedition of General Asinari di San Marzano to block any advance of Ethiopian troops after the defeat at Dogali. Ponza di San Martino commanded the Cacciatori d'Africa and the 7th Bersaglieri Regiment before returning to Italy at the end of 1888. During this campaign, Ponza was also commander of the Arkiko camp, established after reconnaissance he conducted together with a battalion of Cacciatori. He also carried out surveys of the mountains in the surroundings of the camp at the Takbat river, about 16 km from Massawa. His sketches were sent to Quinto Cenni and reproduced by him in his illustrations of the campaign. At the request of General Antonio Baldissera he reproduced the troop movements in the Battle of Segheneyti in a sketch which was sent to the Minister of War. Chief of Staff of the IX Army Corps in 1889, he was employed on a secret mission to Tunisia and Tripolitania in 1890 on the orders of Francesco Crispi to study the Ottoman defences and routes for a possible attack on the French border attack.

== General Staff 1890-1900 ==
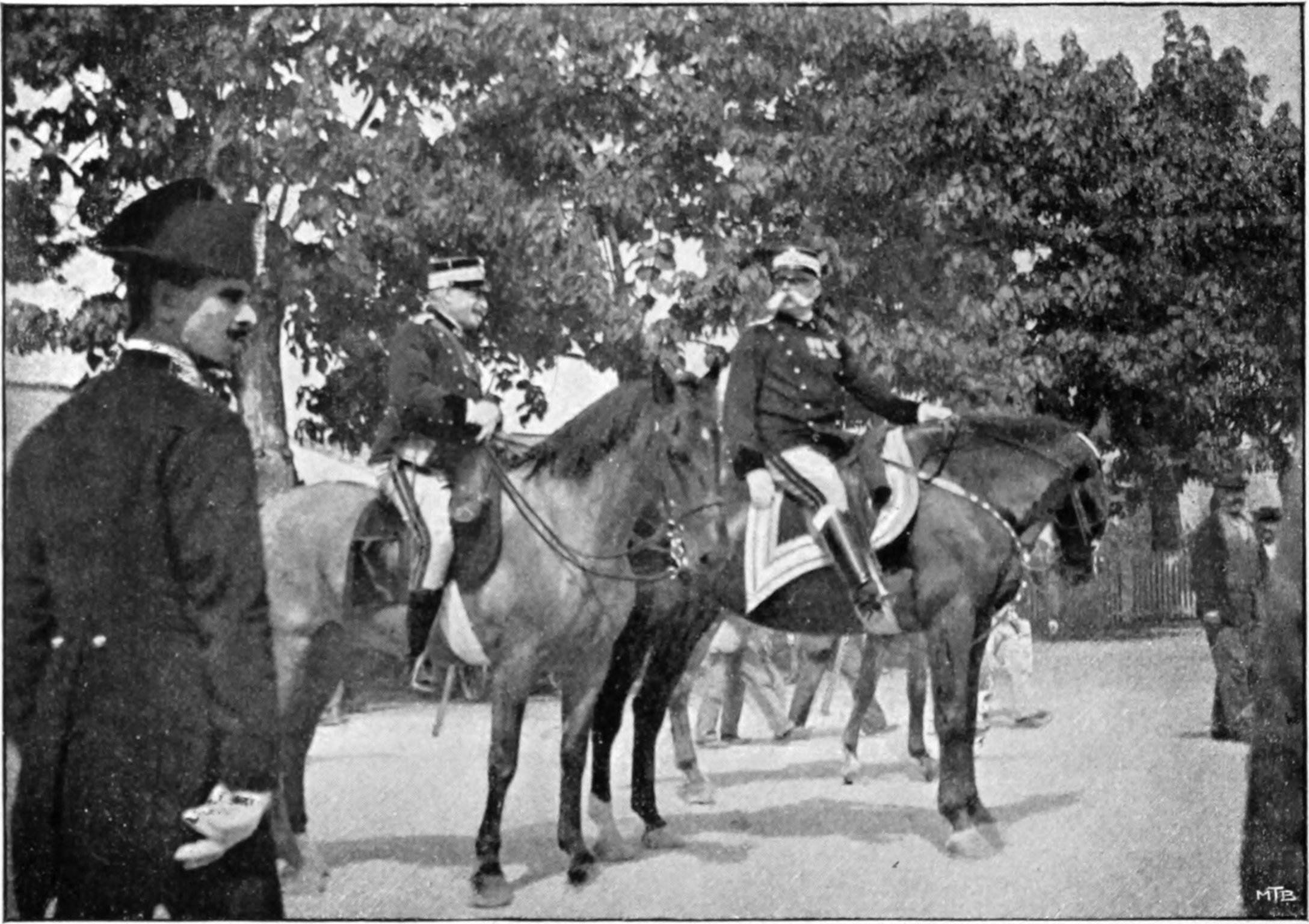
Coriolano Ponza Di Martino (mounted, left) with King Umberto I (mounted, right), 1896

In the years from 1889 to 1893 Coriolano Ponza di San Martino contributed to the Rivista Militare, writing articles on strategy, tactics and army culture. Promoted to major general commanding the Pistoia Brigade in 1894, he was appointed four years later effective aide-de-camp to King Umberto I and commander of the Livorno Division. As aide-de-camp to the King he opposed Ricotti's military policy and pushed Giovanni Giolitti (who needed Ponza di San Martino’s support in the constituency of Dronero, where he was very influential) to criticize it. Subsequently he was deputy commander of the General Staff Corps. At the General Staff he was a convinced advocate of the need to finish the fortification works on the eastern border, emphasising that although Italy was part of the Triple Alliance, a war with Austria-Hungary could not be ruled out. Indeed, upon assuming the office of Minister of War in 1900, one of the first measures he implemented was to order the resumption of fortification works on the Austro-Hungarian border.

== Minister of War 1900-1902 ==
Ponza di San Martino was invited to replace Giuseppe Mirri as Minister of War in April 1900, as part of an agreement between the parliamentary faction of Sidney Sonnino and the Prime Minister Luigi Pelloux. Not having been elected, he was created a Senator by Royal decree to allow for his appointment. As Minister Ponza di San Martino pushed forward with an “offensivist” transformation of Italian military doctrine and with a reform of the Officer Corps. Convinced of the need to strengthen Italy's position within the Triple Alliance, Ponza di San Martino saw the importance of a program of modernization of the Royal Italian Army and of collaboration with the Royal Navy, which he worked on with Navy Minister Enrico Morin.

Unlike most Italian officers, Ponza di San Martino was a supporter of recruitment on a territorial basis (in line with both the old program of the "military left" of Luigi Mezzacapo and Emilio Ferrero as well as with the Prussian military model). Among the strengths of establishing regiments locally was that it avoided separation between the resident population and soldiers and that it reduced mobilization time. His program included the modernization of the Royal Army’s artillery, following the offensivist view of the need for strengthening "special weapons", as opposed to the numerical theory which focused on expanding the infantry.

Ponza di San Martino supported the repressive policies of the First Pelloux government and tried first with Giuseppe Saracco (when he tried to get King Vittorio Emanuele III to approve the state of siege after the assassination of Umberto I) and then with Giuseppe Zanardelli (in the case of the militarization of the railways) to bring forward a policy of "manu militari" repression of strikes while guaranteeing neutrality in disputes between workers and employers. At the time of his confirmation to the Ministry of War by Zanardelli, the newspaper L'Esercito italiano (organ of the offensivists and the "military left") expressed its support for him since he would guarantee the maintenance of the military budget with high levels of spending as well as the exclusion of the far left from military policy issues. Hostile to the idea of an "armed nation" advocated by the Historical Far Left, he opposed in Parliament the granting of rifles from the arsenals to local shooting clubs, one of the "flagship" measures of the democratic coalition.

During his time in office he strengthened the role and functions of the Chief of Staff of the Army - for example during the negotiations for the renewal of the military terms of the Triple Alliance and for the signing of the related Naval Convention in 1900 - starting the process which would come to fruition with the subsequent reforms of 1906 and 1908. In 1900 he secured a large five-year allocation of funds, thereby exempting the Ministry of War from having to account for individual expenditure items. This provision was in line with what had been obtained by the German generals a few years earlier and which strengthened the autonomy of the military from political constraints. In the field of colonial politics he reformed the Royal Corps of Colonial Troops ("Instructions relating to the Royal African Troops" 15 January 1902; RD no. 168 of 03/30/1902) and supported the need to guarantee the autonomy of commander of the troops in the Eritrean colony relative to the civil governor, clashing with Ferdinando Martini.

During his ministry an Italian expeditionary force was sent to China in response to the Boxer Rebellion, with Ponza di San Martino making both its strategic and tactical decisions. He enjoyed the full support first of King Umberto I and then of King Vittorio Emanuele III, so much so that the former imposed him as minister on Saracco and also made his reconfirmation a condition of his giving royal approval to the Zanardelli cabinet. Ponza di San Martino submitted his resignation as minister in protest at the concessions made to railway workers by Zanardelli and Giolitti.

== Later years 1902-1926 ==
At the end of his political career, Ponza di San Martino commanded the military division of Florence (1903–04), which was followed by his appointment as command of the VI Army Corps of Bologna and his involvement in defense study commissions of the State until 1909, the year in which he left active service and dedicated himself to the management of the family properties into which he introduced innovative agricultural techniques. In 1901 he translated from German the work by R. Stutzer (Leipzig, 1895) "Guide to the study of fertilization for the use of farmers and agricultural schools". In 1913 he was a patron and founder member of the Unione Sportiva Pro Dronero together with his brother Cesare and Giovanni Giolitti who became its president. In 1914-1915 he was an interventionist with a national-conservative tendency.

During the First World War he still served as a member of important military commissions and as lieutenant general of the Territorial Militia at the Ministry of War. He was among the senators adhering to the Parliamentary Fascio for National Defence promoted by the nationalist Maffeo Pantaleoni after the battle of Caporetto to overcome the political crisis and continue the war until victory. A supporter of the break-up of Austria-Hungary, he joined the "Italian Committee for Czech-Slovak Independence" chaired by Pietro Lanza di Scalea, collaborating in the formation of the Czechoslovak Legion which fought alongside the Italian Army in the last phase of the Great War. In 1920, due to age limits, he ceased to be part of the Reserve, retaining the rank of lieutenant general and the related uniform. In the Senate he joined the liberal-democratic group, representing one of the exponents of the liberal-nationalist right of Salandra. In later years he joined the Democratic Union group born from the fusion between liberal democrats and social democrats, and then the Italian Liberal Party.

== Honours ==
Grand Cordon of the Order of Saints Maurice and Lazarus - ribbon for ordinary uniform

Grand Cordon of the Order of Saints Maurice and Lazarus

Grand Cordon of the Order of the Crown of Italy - ribbon for ordinary uniform

Grand Cordon of the Order of the Crown of Italy

Medal of Military Valor - ribbon for ordinary uniform

Medal of Military Valor
