= Giuseppe Ottolenghi =

Italian politician and officer (1838–1904)

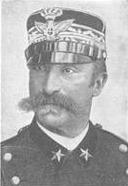

24th Italian Minister of War
- In office May 14, 1902 – September 3, 1903
- Monarch: Victor Emmanuel III of Italy
- Prime Minister: Giuseppe Zanardelli
- Preceded by: Enrico Morin
- Succeeded by: Ettore Pedotti
- In office May 15, 1902 – November 2, 1904

Senator of the Kingdom of Italy

Personal details
- Born: December 26, 1838 Sabbioneta
- Died: November 2, 1904 (aged 65) Turin
- Education: Military Academy of Ivrea
- Cabinet: Zanardelli Cabinet
- Military career
- Allegiance: Kingdom of Sardinia; Kingdom of Italy
- Service years: 1859–1904
- Conflicts: Siege of Gaeta (1860); Battle of Custoza (1866)

Giuseppe Ottolenghi (1838–1904) was an Italian general and politician.

He distinguished himself during the second and third Italian Wars of Independence, and then during his repression of the brigandage, serving as commander of the 12th, 4th and First army corps. From 14 May 1902 to October 21, 1903, he was minister of war under the Zanardelli cabinet, and a senator of the Kingdom of Italy.

== Biography ==
Born in a notable Jewish family originating from the German city of Ettlingen (Ottolenghi in Italian), which produced many rabbis for the Italian Jewish community, Giuseppe Ottolenghi was born in Sabbioneta, Mantua on December 26, 1838, son to a merchant, Aaron. (Note: Aaron is an anglicization of Arrone.)His mother was Gentilla Ester Forti. His family (whose father was originally from Acqui) eventually moved to Piedmont to pursue his studies in Turin, enrolling at the local university. Just before the start of the Second Italian War of Independence, he volunteered to join the Royal Sardinian Army. He took two short courses at the Royal Military Academy and the Normal School of Infantry in Ivrea, at the end of which, on July 27, 1859, he obtained the rank of second-lieutenant, or sottotenente, and joined the 17th Volunteer Training Regiment "Acqui. The next year he was promoted to lieutenant and participated in the Southern Italian campaign, where, on November 12, 1860, he was wounded during the Siege of Gaeta and decorated with a Silver Medal of Military Valor.

In May 1861, Ottolenghi entered the service of the General Staff Corps, (Note: He was the first Jew to be admitted.) where he remained as a senior officer until 1871. On March 12, 1863, he was promoted to captain. Detached ton sixth Army Corps at Naples, he was injured twice during operations against the brigandage, and on May 30, 1864, brigands at Sant'Ilario dello Ionio killed his horse while he was on top of it as he escorted his commander with a mixed column of infantry and cavalry. The incident ended with the destruction of one of the gangs that had attacked them. During the Third war for independence, he assisted the 3rd division under the command of général Filippo Brignone.

On June 24, during the Battle of Custoza, after seeing General Brignone was in danger, he personally placed himself at the head of the carabinieri and the guides at the charge of the command, and charged at the enemy, successfully repelling them and saving the general. For this deed he wads given the Knight's Cross of the Military Order of the Savoy. In the summer of 1869 he was invited to assist the French Army in Châlons-en-Champagne. He fought for the French during the Franco-Prussian War.

In August 1871, he was appointed professor of history in the Military Academy of Modena. Promoted to major on November 9, 1872, he was assigned to the 62nd infantry regiment, based in Sicily. He returned to Modena in 1873.

In 1877, Giuseppe Ottolenghi married Elisa Lea Segre in Turin. That year, he became the 2nd territorial division's Chief of Staff in Alessandria and was promoted to lieutenant-colonel. In April 1879, he served as a member of the International Commission, which was charged after the Congress of Berlin to deal with the borders between Montenegro and the Ottoman Empire. In June 1881, he was promoted to colonel, taking command of the 27th Infantry Regiment "Pavia", which he held for about a year, before he left to command the 4th Alpine Regiment, which had just been founded in Turin.

In 1884, he came back to the General Staff Corps, first as an attaché to the Second Army Corps in Genoa, then to Turin in 1886 to join the First Army Corps. (Note: These missions were considered particularly important given the relations with France at that time.)

On April 8, 1888, he was appointed colonel brigadier and given command of the King's Brigade, stationed in Rome. (Note: He was the first Jewish soldier to reach the rank of general.) de général de division He became General major on April 14. During his stay in the capital, he was picked by Umberto I to teach Vittorio Emanuele III on warfare and military matters. Ottolenghi's ties to the future king continued from 1891 to 1892, when the Prince took command of the First Infantry Regiment, after the King's Brigade had been transferred to Naples.

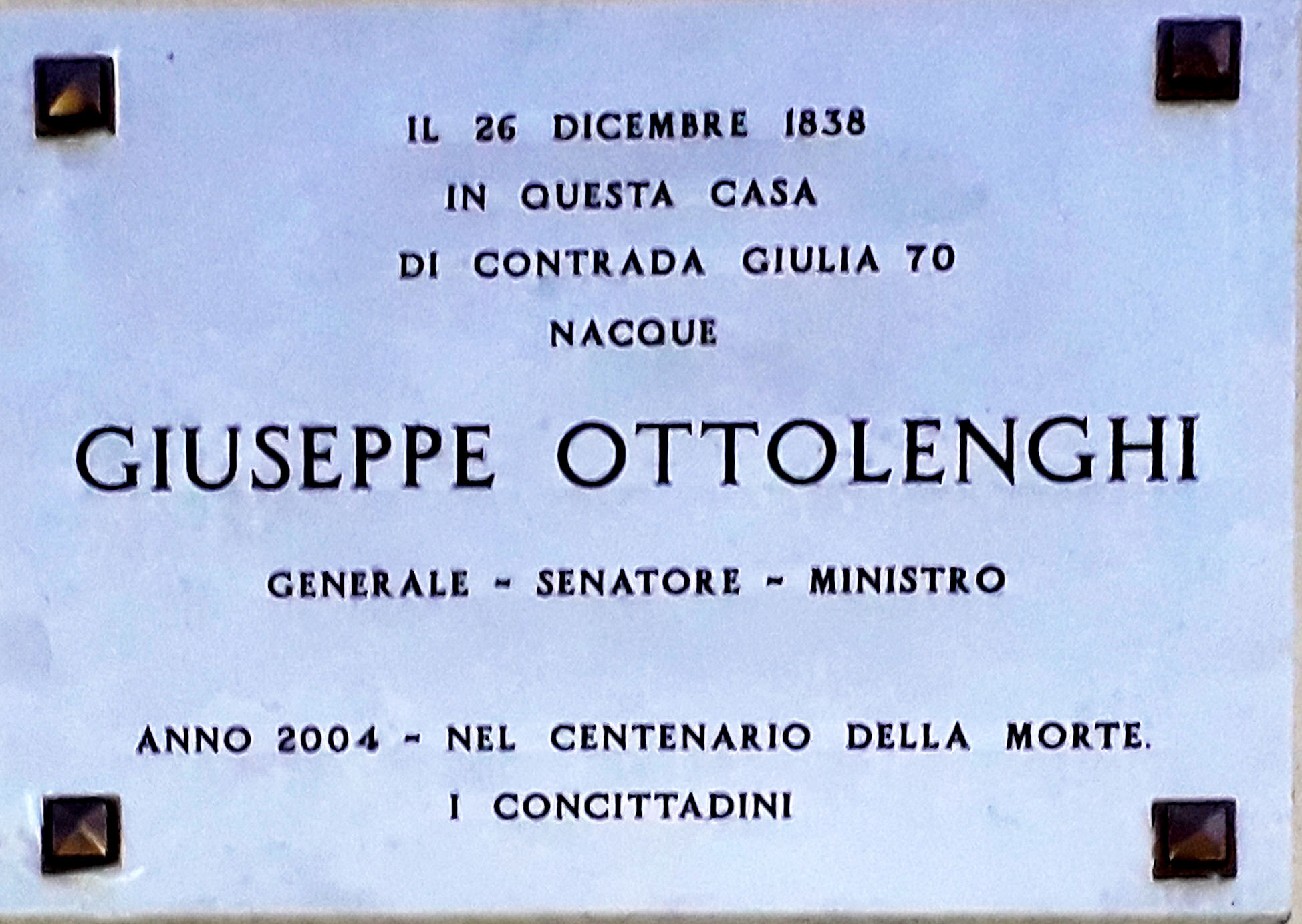
Ottolenghi's tombstone in Sabbioneta

In January 1895, Ottolenghi rose to the position of lieutenant general and was sent to Turin as commander of the local territorial military division, holding this position until he left for Palermo in July 1899, acquiring leadership of the 12th Army Corps. On April 16, 1902, he headed the Fourth Army Corps for a month. ON May 14, he was granted the role of Italian Minister of War under the liberal cabinet of Giuseppe Zanardelli, replacing Coriolano Ponza di San Martino. During the Zanardelli Cabinet he was also a Senator of the Kingdom.

The short rewards of the government budget made his plans to modernize the army impossible, especially his ideas on recruitment and the workforce, (Note: Some of the measures he proposed were later implemented by his successors.) but he managed to make a significant impact on the Italian military. Ottolenghi's measures were characterized by heavily decentralizing tasks through the division of labour, accelerating the jobs of numerous junior officers by promoting 400 supernumerary lieutenants to captains, expanded the numbers of pharmacists in military hospitals, and formed some of the first ski companies in the Alpine regiments, building on the work of his predecessor Ponza di San Martino.

Zanardelli resigned on October 21, 1903. On December 1 Ottolenghi was placed in charge of the First Army Corps, which he held until his sudden death from a heart attack on November 2, 1904. He is buried in the city's Israelite University. He was the father of the insurer Carlo Ottolenghi.

=== Military career ===
- Second-lieutenant (Italian: sottotenente) July 27, 1859
- Lieutenant (Italian: tenente) November 7, 1860
- Captain (Italian: capitano) March 12, 1863
- Major (Italian: maggiore) November 9, 1872
- Lieutenant colonel (Italian: tenente colonnello): July 15, 1877
- Colonel (Italian: colonnello): June 12, 1881
- Division general (Italian: maggiore generale): April 14, 1889
- Lieutenant-general (Italian: tenente generale): January 13, 1895

=== Positions and titles ===
- Professor of art and military history at the School of Infantry and Cavalry (August 19, 1871 – May 2, 1873)
- Representative of Italy at the Congress of Berlin (June–July 1878)
- Member of the International Commission for the Delimitation of the Turkish-Montenegrin Frontier (April 8, 1879-May 1880) (November–December 1880)
- Member of the Società Geografica Italiana (1869)

== Decorations ==
=== Italian awards ===
Knight of the Military Order of Savoy (1866)

Silver Medal of Military Valor – For the bravery demonstrated during the siege of Gaeta

Silver Medal of Military Valor – For the repression of banditry

Knight of the Grand Cross decorated with the Grand Cordon of the Order of the Crown of Italy

Grand Officer of the Order of Saints Maurice and Lazarus

Golden Cross for Seniority of Service (40 years)

Commemorative Medal of the Unity of Italy – For the campaigns of the Wars of Independence

Commemorative Medal of the Unity of Italy – For the Unification of Italy

=== Foreign honours ===
Commemorative medal of the 1859 Italian Campaign

== Publications ==
- Tattica ed operazioni speciali, Tipografia sociale, Modena, 1873.

== Bibliography ==
- (it) Pierluigi Briganti, Il contributo militare degli ebrei italiani alla Grande Guerra 1915–1918, Turin, Silvio Zamorani editore, 2009.
- (it) Piero Crociani, Ottolenghi, Giuseppe, dans le Dizionario biografico degli italiani, vol. 79, Roma, Istituto dell'Enciclopedia Italiana, 2013.
- (it) Jacopo Lorenzini, Uomini e generali: L'élite militare nell'Italia liberale (1882–1915), Milan, Franco Angeli Editore, 2017.
- (it) Maurizio Molinari, Ebrei in Italia: un problema di identità (1870–1938), Florence, Editrice La Giuntina, 1991.
- (it) Angelo Pezzana, Quest'anno a Gerusalemme: gli ebrei italiani in Israele, Florence, Editrice La Giuntina, 2008.
