= Zanardelli government =

39th Government of Kingdom of Italy

- 39th Cabinet of Italy

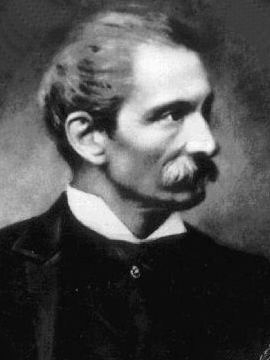
- Date formed: 15 February 1901
- Date dissolved: 3 November 1903

People and organisations
- Head of state: Victor Emmanuel III
- Head of government: Giuseppe Zanardelli
- Total no. of members: 11
- Member party: Historical Left; Historical Right

History
- Predecessor: Saracco Cabinet
- Successor: Giolitti II Cabinet

The Zanardelli government of Italy held office from 15 February 1901 until 3 November 1903, a total of 991 days, or 2 years, 8 months and 19 days.

== Government parties ==
The government was composed by the following parties:

Party	Ideology	Leader
Historical Left	Liberalism	Giovanni Giolitti
Historical Right	Conservatism	Antonio Starabba di Rudinì

== Composition ==
Office	Name	Party	Term
Prime Minister	Giuseppe Zanardelli	Historical Left	(1901–1903)
Minister of the Interior	Giovanni Giolitti	Historical Left	(1901–1903)
Minister of the Interior	Giuseppe Zanardelli	Historical Left	(1903–1903)
Minister of Foreign Affairs	Giulio Prinetti	Historical Right	(1901–1903)
Minister of Foreign Affairs	Enrico Morin	Military	(1903–1903)
Minister of Grace and Justice	Francesco Cocco-Ortu	Historical Left	(1901–1903)
Minister of Finance	Leone Wollemborg	Historical Left	(1901–1901)
Minister of Finance	Paolo Carcano	Historical Left	(1901–1903)
Minister of Treasury	Ernesto Di Broglio	Historical Left	(1901–1903)
Minister of War	Coriolano Ponza di San Martino	Military	(1901–1902)
Minister of War	Enrico Morin	Military	(1902–1902)
Minister of War	Giuseppe Ottolenghi	Military	(1902–1903)
Minister of the Navy	Enrico Morin	Military	(1901–1903)
Minister of the Navy	Giovanni Bettolo	Military	(1903–1903)
Minister of the Navy	Enrico Morin	Military	(1903–1903)
Minister of Agriculture, Industry and Commerce	Silvestro Picardi	Historical Left	(1901–1901)
Minister of Agriculture, Industry and Commerce	Giuseppe Zanardelli	Historical Left	(1901–1901)
Minister of Agriculture, Industry and Commerce	Guido Baccelli	Historical Left	(1901–1903)
Minister of Public Works	Girolamo Giusso	Historical Right	(1901–1902)
Minister of Public Works	Giuseppe Zanardelli	Historical Left	(1902–1902)
Minister of Public Works	Nicola Balenzano	Historical Right	(1902–1903)
Minister of Public Education	Nunzio Nasi	Historical Left	(1901–1903)
Minister of Post and Telegraphs	Tancredi Galimberti	Historical Left	(1901–1902)
