= Uncial 0154 =

- New Testament manuscript
- Text: Mark 10:35-46; 11:17-28
- Date: 9th century
- Script: Greek
- Now at: Qubbat al-Khazna
- Size: 27 x 21 cm
- Type: ?
- Category: none

Uncial 0154 (in the Gregory-Aland numbering), ε 074 (in the Soden numbering), is a Greek uncial manuscript of the New Testament, dated palaeographically to the 9th century.

== Description ==
The codex contains two small parts of the Gospel of Mark 10:35-46; 11:17-28, on two parchment leaves (27 cm by 21 cm). It is written in two columns per page, 22 lines per page, in uncial letters.

The Greek text of this codex is mixed. Kurt Aland did not place it in Categories of New Testament manuscripts.

Currently it is dated by the Institute for New Testament Textual Research to the 9th century.

The codex used to be held in Qubbat al-Khazna in Damascus. The present location of the codex is unknown. The manuscript is not accessible.

== See also ==
- List of New Testament uncials
- Textual criticism
- Uncial 0144
