= Nicolò Gallo =

Italian politician (1849–1907)

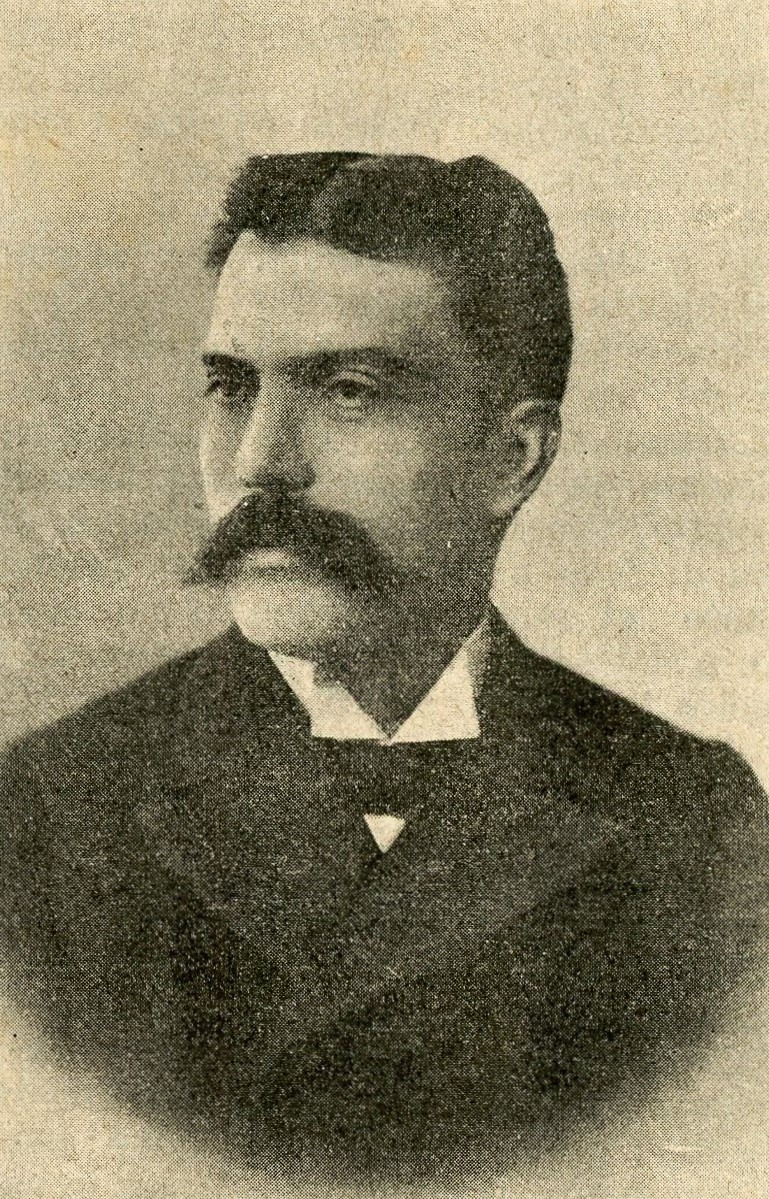

President of the Chamber of Deputies
- In office 16 June 1900 – 24 June 1900
- Preceded by: Giuseppe Colombo
- Succeeded by: Tommaso Villa

Minister of Public Education
- In office 14 December 1897 – 1 June 1898
- Preceded by: Giovanni Codronchi
- Succeeded by: Luigi Cremona
- In office 24 June 1900 – 15 February 1901
- Preceded by: Guido Baccelli
- Succeeded by: Nunzio Nasi

Minister of Justice
- In office 29 May 1906 – 4 March 1907
- Preceded by: Giuseppe Colombo
- Succeeded by: Tommaso Villa

Member of the Chamber of Deputies
- In office 22 November 1882 – 7 March 1907

Nicolò Gallo (Agrigento, 10 August 1849 – Rome, 7 March 1907) was an Italian politician of the historical Left. He was both Minister of Public Education and Minister of Justice; for a short time he was also president of the Chamber of Deputies of the Kingdom of Italy.

== Biography ==
He was born on 15 August 1849 to Doctor Gregorio Gallo and his wife Maria Restivo. He went to a local school before moving to the Royal High School. He studied law at the University of Palermo, graduating with top marks and embarking on a legal career. In 1867 he began his political career as a municipal councilor of Agrigento and remained in the municipal council for several years. A few years later he was elected provincial councilor from the constituency of Bivona and then of Agrigento, holding the position of president of that council for fourteen years.

As well as being a lawyer Gallo had a strong interest in literature, composing poems, tragedies and critical essays. As a young man he wrote patriotic poems and theater productions, including the play Cola di Rienzo. In 1885 he became a professor of Aesthetics at the La Sapienza University. His studies of social ethics included the essays "The genesis of the idea of law" and "The death penalty". He also wrote L'Idealismo e la letteratura and La scienza dell'arte.

Elected for the first time to the Chamber of Deputies in 1882 and represented several constituencies, being re-elected without interruption until his death. 1900 he was elected in the constituency of Foligno, in Umbria, and finally he was elected from his home constituency of Agrigento.

A friend and follower of Giuseppe Zanardelli, he entered the fourth di Rudinì government as Minister of Public Education (December 1897-June 1898). He returned to the same cabinet post from June 1900 to February 1901 in the Saracco government. He was then Minister of Justice in the fourth Giolitti government.
