= Giuseppe Palumbo =

Giuseppe Palumbo may refer to:

- Giuseppe Palumbo (cyclist)
- Giuseppe Palumbo (admiral)
