= Ali Sami Bey =

Ottoman naval officer, photographer and anti-Kemalist journalist

- Ali Sami Bey
- Born: c. 1872
- Died: 24 February 1943 (?); Athens, Greece
- Military career
- Allegiance: Ottoman Empire (1892–1909); Kingdom of Greece (1919–)
- Branch: Ottoman Navy (1892–1909); Greek Army (1919–1922)
- Service years: 1892–1909; 1919–1922
- Rank: Colonel
- Conflicts: Greco-Turkish War (1897); Greco-Turkish War (1919–1922)
- Awards: Iftikhar Sanayi Medal; Order of Osmanieh (3rd class); Order of the Medjidie (4th class)
- Other work: Photographer, journalist

Ali Sami Bey (born c. 1872 – 24 February 1943?), also known as Bahriyeli Ali Sami ("Sailor Ali Sami"), (Note: Ali Sami Bey is not to be confused with Ali Sami Boyar (1880–1967), a naval officer and painter, or with Ali Sami Aközer (1866–1936), also known as Üsküdarlı Ali Sami. Aközer was another Ottoman officer and photographer whose work has sometimes been confused with that of Bahriyeli Ali Sami. However, their different military backgrounds make it easy to distinguish the two photographers. M. Sinan Genim explicitly notes that the designation Bahriyeli was used to distinguish him.) was an Ottoman naval officer, photographer, journalist and newspaper publisher. He worked as a photographer for Sultan Abdülhamid II before losing his official positions following the Young Turk Revolution. He later settled in Thessaloniki and became an opponent of the Turkish National Movement.

During the Greco-Turkish War (1919–1922), he supported the Greek campaign in Anatolia, fighting for Greece, leading a militia and attaining the rank of colonel. He also published an anti-Kemalist newspaper, notably condemning the Armenian genocide and the Greek genocide. After the war, he remained in Greece, where he continued his photography work throughout the country, especially on Mount Athos.

== Early life and career ==
Ali Sami was born at around 1872, to Mehmed Bey and his unnamed wife, originating from Kasımpaşa, Beyoğlu in Constantinople. He entered the Ottoman Naval College on 14 May 1890 and graduated on 22 May 1892 as an engineer sub-lieutenant. By 1893, he began publishing photography manuals, including the Mebadi-i Usul-i Fotoğrafya, one of the earliest Ottoman publications on photography. He dedicated the book to Abdülhamid II. On 7 August 1893, he received an iftihar (honour) medal for writing the manual.

Ali Sami later worked as a photographer for the Ottoman navy, recording warships, naval officers and visiting foreign dignitaries. He also taught photography at the naval school and was associated with photographic work for the imperial palace. In 1894, he photographed a visit by King Alexander I of Serbia to Mount Athos. In 1895, he worked as a photographic official at the Beyoğlu police department. On 13 March 1896, while holding the rank of lieutenant, he received the fourth-class Order of the Medjidie. During the Greco-Turkish War (1897), he served in the Ottoman navy and received a silver medal for his wartime service. Following the war, he was appointed to direct an exhibition at Yıldız Palace, and produced photographic albums for the sultan.

Ali Sami Bey in 1902.

In 1898, Ali Sami accompanied German emperor Wilhelm II on his visit to the Levant, including Damascus and the Umayyad Mosque. In 1900, he photographed vessels built at the İzmit shipyard and the construction of the Haydarpaşa port facilities. That year, he also compiled a photographic album of the Darülaceze, where he served as honorary chief photographer alongside his naval duties. He attended the institution once a week and was paid two silver mecidiye for the work. In 1901, he photographed the visit of Germany's Prince Adalbert to Constantinople.

Ali Sami was promoted to major in August 1902. In 1902, he photographed manuscript fragments from the Qubbat al-Khazna for the Ottoman government before their transfer to the German embassy. The photographs were intended to help ensure the return of the fragments. He took over 3,116 photographs, two for each fragment, and handed them over to German officials. These photographs are now lost. In 1903, he photographed visits by German princes and Italian admiral Giuseppe Palombo, together with a reception in the admiral's honour. He was replaced as Darülaceze photographer by naval photographer Rıza Efendi in October that year.

In 1904, he accompanied an Ottoman delegation to the ceremonies marking the opening of the Hejaz Railway section at Ma'an, photographing events at Ma'an and Daraa. Promoted to colonel on 12 December 1905, he photographed the interiors and exteriors of Ottoman warships repaired by the Italian firm Ansaldo in 1905–1906, including Feth-i Bülend, Muin-i Zafer and Avnullah. In 1906, he was granted the title of chief imperial photographer (Ser-fotoğrafî-i Hazret-i Şehriyari). He was also awarded the third class of the Order of Osmanieh for his services under Abdülhamid II. A certain art medal is also recorded among his honours, although the available sources do not date these awards.

== Young Turk Revolution and World War I ==
After the Young Turk Revolution in 1908, Ali Sami served as an active member of Abdülhamid II's informer network, carrying out investigations and surveillance on the sultan's behalf. After the deposition of Abdülhamid II in 1909, Ali Sami lost his position on 4 May of the same year. His property was also seized and he left for Egypt, taking a government-owned camera with him.

Ali Sami subsequently lived in Thessaloniki, where Abdülhamid had been sent into exile. By 1912, he was publishing a newspaper called Hak. During World War I, he published the Greek–French weekly Le Droit/To Dikaion (transl. Justice), which described itself as supporting the Entente and the interests of Islam and the Greeks, criticizing the Committee of Union and Progress. The publication was popular enough to receive commentary from the Cretan Muslim newspaper İstikbal.

== Greco-Turkish War ==
Advertisement for Ali Sami Bey's photography laboratory and night school in Filippiada. On the left, a picture of him as an Ottoman officer. On the right, a picture of him as a Greek officer.

At the start of the Greco-Turkish War, in an open letter published in the Athens newspaper Dikaio on 20 November 1919, Ali Sami offered to place himself and his men under the orders of the Greek government and said that he was willing to serve wherever it directed him. During the Greek campaign in Anatolia, he travelled to Greek-held territory and published the Turkish-language anti-Kemalist newspaper Adalet (transl. Justice) in Bandırma. He defended Abdülhamid's reign and criticized Mustafa Kemal and the Committee of Union and Progress.

Ali Sami served as commander of an irregular armed militia fighting for the Greek Army and achieved the rank of colonel under Greek general Konstantinos G. Petimezas. The latter's militia served near Manisa. The Greek military authorities also assigned him to Savaştepe. Petimezas later credited him for conducting confidential staff duties in the Greek army as well. In an article of 23 August 1921, at the first day of the Battle of the Sakarya, he wrote in Adalet: "With the Greeks' arrival, the sun of freedom and brotherhood also rose". He blamed the Committee of Union and Progress and Mustafa Kemal's Turkish National Movement for years of oppression and urged Muslims to live alongside Christians as brothers and fellow citizens.

Ali Sami also publicly criticized the Armenian genocide and the Greek genocide. In a statement reproduced in a speech delivered to the Hellenic Parliament in May 1922, he condemned the violence around Samsun and in Pontus and Cilicia, and accused France of encouraging the Kemalists through its assistance. Addressing the French government, he wrote in Adalet:

We are in the twentieth century, Mustapha Kemal and his men are undefined criminals. You the so-called civilised France, behold the massacres of Samsoun! Your assistance to the Kemalists constitutes the greatest crime. You have been the cause of the disappearance of thousands of Greeks and Armenians beneath the feet of these criminals. You, Mr. Poincaré, should be aware that the responsibility of hundreds and thousands of Greeks and Armenians in Pontus and Cilicia falls greatly upon France, whose alliance with Kemal has given rise to these atrocities. History will record in black letters this injustice committed by France. In the name of my fellow country-men, I protest against this wrong.

Ali Sami Bey’s letter to Eleftherios Venizelos, 30 September 1922.

Following the Greek withdrawal from Anatolia, Ali Sami returned to Thessaloniki. On 30 September 1922 he wrote to the newly-returned Eleftherios Venizelos about the persecution of anti-Kemalist Muslims and their refusal to submit to the new nationalist movement. In the letter, he claimed that some 30,000 anti-Kemalist Muslims had fled with him to Greece and that hundreds of thousands more remained in Anatolia and Istanbul. He asserted that nearly one million Muslims opposed Kemalist rule, accused Kemalist forces of killing unarmed women and children, and asked Venizelos to urge the Great Powers to take humanitarian measures. He also wrote that opposition to Kemal extended beyond Anatolia, including among Muslims living in Arab countries.

In addition, he worked with Greek authorities to influence local Muslims against Mustafa Kemal, weakening their ties to the Turkish National Movement, and also encouraged support for Greek claims to Thrace during the Lausanne negotiations.

He was subsequently included among the 150 personae non gratae of Turkey, a list of high-ranking personages of the Ottoman Empire who were exiled from the Republic of Turkey.

== Later life and photography in Greece ==
Ali Sami Bey with a priest on Mount Athos.

In October 1924, Ali Sami was again publishing To Dikaion (The Right or Justice) in Thessaloniki. The paper called itself a Greek democratic newspaper and a voice of refugees, and had a presence in other northern Greek cities, including Serres, Drama, Kavala and Xanthi. By 1 July 1926, his newspaper Dikaion had reached its fiftieth issue, identifying Ali Sami as its proprietor and editor and describing itself as a Greek democratic newspaper representing refugees. Historian Konstantinos Tsitselikis considers the newspaper to have produced a "reliable analysis of the Greek political scene".

Ali Sami was personally exempted from the 1923 Greek–Turkish population exchange. In October 1924 he protested to the prefect of Thessaloniki against a proposal by the departing mufti to take the carpets of the Hamza Bey Mosque to Turkey. He argued that the carpets belonged to the mosque's waqf and should remain for those Muslims, including anti-Kemalists and foreign nationals, who continued to reside in the city, instead of being sent to Turkey. In 1927, he also publicly rejected accusations circulating in Turkey that the Greek government was mistreating the Muslims in Western Thrace. In addition, during the same year, the Turkish government requested his expulsion from Greece in a diplomatic note, alongside other anti-Kemalist exiles, however that request was declined. He was also allegedly involved in a supposed plot to assassinate Mustafa Kemal. A 1928 Foreign Greek Ministry record listed Ali Sami as residing in Kavala, although other accounts place him in Thessaloniki.

Ali Sami Bey near a waterfall in Greece.

He maintained a photographic studio at 4 Raktivan Street, behind the Thessaloniki Government House. From about 1925 to 1927, he worked on Mount Athos, photographing monasteries, religious objects, monks and landscapes. He initially worked at the Skete of Saint Andrew and later opened a studio in Karyes, where he was assisted by the photographer Athanasios Kontakis. On 26 April 1928, he sent a card to the abbot of Simonopetra, announcing further postcards of the peninsula and seeking support for a photographic album. Two handmade albums of his Athonite photographs have been preserved in the Christos Kalemkeris Archive.

After leaving Mount Athos he worked in other parts of Greece, including Kalavryta. He travelled with his camera, photographing people, monuments, towns and landscapes, and sold photographs and albums to support himself.

Ali Sami Bey near a spring in Greece.

By 1932, he was working in Messenia, where he opened a studio on Aristomenous Street in Kalamata and a photographic workshop in Gargalianoi. He photographed Methoni, Pylos and other settlements, and produced a photographic album of Trifylia. Photographs from his work in the region are held by the Messenia branch of the General State Archives. He remained in Messenia until 1933.

In 1937, Ali Sami maintained a photographic studio at Tholopotami in Chios, where a number of his photographs survive, later travelling to Samos. Ali Sami also had a wife, who accompanied him to Thessaloniki. The couple had children together. According to a January 1938 report, their residence was in Kalamata, also stating the family had all converted to Greek Orthodox Christianity, although this alleged conversion remains unverified. In March 1938, he organized a photographic exhibition in Filippiada in Epirus, where he also operated a photographic studio and night school, later also opening a studio in nearby Margariti. A photographic album of Margariti contained 52 photographs and was preserved by local resident Toula Stefanidou-Malakata, who made it available to the village museum. One of his photographs shows the western side of the Margariti Castle and was later reproduced in a study by the Greek Ministry of Culture's Ephorate of Antiquities of Thesprotia.

Ali Sami's documented activities become difficult to trace after 1938, with his date and place of death remained uncertain. Turkish historian and journalist Gazanfer İbar stated that Ali Sami never returned to Turkey, while historian Hakan Özoğlu states that he died in Athens on 24 February 1943.

== Sources ==
- Ali Sami Bey (30 September 1922). "Letter from Ali Sami Bey to E. Venizelos regarding the persecution of anti-Kemalist Muslims and their decision not to submit to the Kemalist yoke". SearchCulture.gr. National Research Foundation Eleftherios K. Venizelos.
- Bakagiannis, Vangelis (March–April 1988). "Αλή Σαμή Βέης: Αρχιφωτογράφος του Σουλτάν Χαμίτ" (PDF). Νέα του Μαργαριτίου (in Greek). No. 73–74. p. 5.
- Baltazzi, G. (1922). The Turkish Atrocities in Asia Minor and in the Pontus.
- Çizgen, Engin (1992). Türkiye'de Fotoğraf (in Turkish). Istanbul: İletişim Yayınları.
- Çolak, Orhan M. (2022). "Yıldız Koleksiyonu'nda Balkanlar". In Akkuş, Zülgaip (ed.). Sultan II. Abdülhamid Han'ın Yıldız Albümlerinde Balkanlar (PDF) (in Turkish). Ankara: Yurtdışı Türkler ve Akraba Topluluklar Başkanlığı. pp. 57–70. ISBN 9789751752147.
- Dede, Evren (July 2009). "Batı Trakya'da 150'likler -V". Azınlıkça (in Turkish). No. 49.
- Erbay, Cüneyd; Hirschler, Konrad (2020). "Writing Middle Eastern Agency into the History of the Qubbat al-Khazna: The Late Ottoman State and Manuscripts as Historical Artefacts". In D'Ottone Rambach, Arianna; Hirschler, Konrad; Vollandt, Ronny (eds.). The Damascus Fragments: Towards a History of the Qubbat al-Khazna Corpus of Manuscripts and Documents. Ergon Verlag. pp. 151–178. doi:10.5771/9783956507564-151.
- Erutku, Bülent Ümit (2022). "Türkiye'de 2000-2021 Yılları Arasında Basılı Fotoğraf Yayınları İçin Bir Değerlendirme" (PDF). Sanat ve İnsan (in Turkish): 141–149.
- Exertzoglou, Haris (2016). "Children of Memory: Narratives of the Asia Minor Catastrophe and the Making of Refugee Identity in Interwar Greece" (PDF). Journal of Modern Greek Studies. 34 (2): 343–366. doi:10.1353/mgs.2016.0030.
- General State Archives of Greece (1 July 1926). "Εφημερίς «Δίκαιον»". Ψηφιακή Πύλη Αρχείων 1922 (in Greek). GR GSA-IAM_PRS004.01.
- Genim, M. Sinan (2016). "İstanbul'da Fotoğrafın ve İstanbul Fotoğraflarının Tarihi". Büyük İstanbul Tarihi (PDF) (in Turkish). p. 451.
- Hekimoglou, Evanghelos; Roupa, Efrosyni (1996). "An Ottoman Philhellene Photographer on Mount Athos: Ali Sami Bey". Thessaloniki Photographers on Mount Athos: Ali Sami the Ottoman Philhellene Photographer. Thessaloniki: The Mount Athos Photographic Archive. pp. 13–17. ISBN 9608433193.
- İbar, Gazanfer (2019). "İstanbul ve Ankara'nın kalem savaşları". Atlas Tarih (in Turkish). No. 2019/01. pp. 144–151.
- Katsikas, Stefanos (2021). Islam and Nationalism in Modern Greece, 1821–1940. Oxford University Press. ISBN 9780190652005.
- Kornetis, Kostis; Poulos, Panagiotis C. (2021). "Moving Objects, Images, and Memories: Hamza Bey Mosque/Alcazar Cinema as an Affective Archive of Thessaloniki". Bulletin de correspondance hellénique moderne et contemporain. 4: 87–114. doi:10.4000/bchmc.820. hdl:10486/710787.
- Lazari, Kassiani; Lazou, Theodora; Koukoula, Anastasia (2021). Κάστρο Μαργαριτίου (Report) (in Greek). Υπουργείο Πολιτισμού και Αθλητισμού, Εφορεία Αρχαιοτήτων Θεσπρωτίας.
- Mazower, Mark (2005). Salonica, City of Ghosts: Christians, Muslims and Jews, 1430–1950. New York: Alfred A. Knopf. ISBN 9780375412981.
- Messinia.mobi. "Photo Album Trifylia, 1932". Messinia.mobi.
- Özçelik, Hayrunnisa (2024). Osmanlı Devleti ve toplumunda fotoğraf ve fotoğrafçılık: İstanbul örneği (Master's thesis) (in Turkish). Marmara University.
- Özendes, Engin (1999). "Saray Fotoğrafçıları" (PDF). MS: Tarih Kültür Sanat Mimarlık (in Turkish) (1): 156–169.
- Özoğlu, Hakan (2011). From Caliphate to Secular State: Power Struggle in the Early Turkish Republic. Praeger. ISBN 9780313379567.
- Özsarı, Mustafa (5 September 2021). "Kalemlerimizi silah olarak kullanmaya hazırız!". Balıkesirim (in Turkish).
- Rovva, Katerina (15 May 2026). "Αλή Σαμή Μπέης: Ο φωτογράφος του σουλτάνου που απεικόνισε την Ελλάδα του Μεσοπολέμου". Ta Nea (in Greek).
- Soysal, İlhami (13 October 1984). "150'likler". Milliyet (in Turkish). p. 9.
- Strauss, Johann (1990). "The Cretan Muslims and Their Struggle for Ottomanism: Some Evidence from the Periodical Press (Sada-yı Girid, Istikbal)". V. Milletlerarası Türkiye Sosyal ve İktisat Tarihi Kongresi: Tebliğler (PDF). Ankara: Türk Tarih Kurumu. pp. 55–66.
- Tsitselikis, Konstantinos (2012). Old and New Islam in Greece: From Historical Minorities to Immigrant Newcomers. Martinus Nijhoff Publishers. ISBN 9789004221529.
- Tsitselikis, Konstantinos (2020). "The Muslims of Thessaloniki, 1912–2012: A Discontinuous and Uncomfortable Presence". In Keridis, Dimitris; Kiesling, John Brady (eds.). Thessaloniki: A City in Transition, 1912–2012. Routledge. pp. 243–259. doi:10.4324/9780429201561-18.
- Yılmaz, Ahmet Yusuf (2022). Cumhuriyetin Sürgünleri Yüzellilikler (PhD thesis) (in Turkish). Ankara Hacı Bayram Veli University.
- Zografos, Anastasios (2013). Le volontaire dans l’armée grecque durant la guerre gréco-turque en Asie mineure (1919–1923) (PhD thesis) (in French). Université Paul-Valéry Montpellier III.
