= Uncial 0158 =

- New Testament manuscript
- Text: Galatians 1:1-13
- Date: 5th / 6th century
- Script: Greek
- Now at: Qubbat al-Khazna
- Size: 30 x 22 cm
- Type: unknown
- Category: ?

Uncial 0158 (in the Gregory-Aland numbering), α 1039 (in the Soden numbering), is a Greek uncial manuscript of the New Testament, dated palaeographically to the 5th century (or 6th century).

== Description ==
The codex contains a small part of the Epistle to the Galatians 1:1-13, on one parchment leaf (30 cm by 22 cm). Written in two columns per page, 25 lines per page, in uncial letters. It is a palimpsest, the upper text is in Arabic.

The text-type of this codex is unknown. Kurt Aland did not place it in any of Categories of New Testament manuscripts.

It is dated by the Institute for New Testament Textual Research to the 5th or 6th century.

The codex used to be held in Qubbat al-Khazna in Damascus. The present location of the codex is unknown. The manuscript is not accessible.

== See also ==
- List of New Testament uncials
- Textual criticism
