= Saracco government =

38th Government of Kingdom of Italy

- 38th Cabinet of Italy

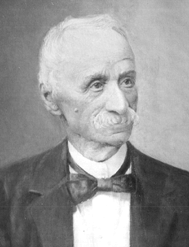
- Date formed: 24 June 1900
- Date dissolved: 15 February 1901

People and organisations
- Head of state: Umberto I Victor Emmanuel III
- Head of government: Giuseppe Saracco
- Total no. of members: 11
- Member party: Historical Left; Historical Right

History
- Predecessor: Pelloux II Cabinet
- Successor: Zanardelli Cabinet

The Saracco government of Italy held office from 24 June 1900 until 15 February 1901, a total of 236 days, or 7 months and 22 days.

== Government parties ==
The government was composed by the following parties:

Party	Ideology	Leader
Historical Left	Liberalism	Giovanni Giolitti
Historical Right	Conservatism	Antonio Starabba di Rudinì

== Composition ==
Office	Name	Party	Term
Prime Minister	Giuseppe Saracco	Historical Left	(1900–1901)
Minister of the Interior	Giuseppe Saracco	Historical Left	(1900–1901)
Minister of Foreign Affairs	Emilio Visconti Venosta	Historical Right	(1900–1901)
Minister of Grace and Justice	Emanuele Gianturco	Historical Right	(1900–1901)
Minister of Finance	Bruno Chimirri	Historical Right	(1900–1901)
Minister of Treasury	Giulio Rubini	Historical Right	(1900–1900)
Minister of Treasury	Bruno Chimirri	Historical Right	(1900–1901)
Minister of Treasury	Gaspare Finali	Historical Right	(1901–1901)
Minister of War	Coriolano Ponza di San Martino	Military	(1900–1901)
Minister of the Navy	Enrico Morin	Military	(1900–1901)
Minister of Agriculture, Industry and Commerce	Paolo Carcano	Historical Left	(1900–1901)
Minister of Public Works	Ascanio Branca	Historical Right	(1900–1901)
Minister of Public Education	Nicolò Gallo	Historical Left	(1900–1901)
Minister of Post and Telegraphs	Alessandro Pascolato	Historical Left	(1900–1901)
