= Uncial 0157 =

- New Testament manuscript
- Text: 1 John 2:7-13
- Date: 7th / 8th century
- Script: Greek
- Now at: Qubbat al-Khazna
- Size: [21.5] x 28.4 cm
- Type: unknown
- Category: ?

Uncial 0157 (in the Gregory-Aland numbering), α 1007 (in the Soden numbering), is a Greek uncial manuscript of the New Testament, dated palaeographically to the 7th century (or 8th century).

== Description ==
The codex contains a small part of the Gospel of John 1:25-27, on one a fragmentary parchment leaf ([21.5] cm by 28.4 cm). The text is written in two columns per page, 21 lines per page, in uncial letters.

The Greek text of this codex is unknown. Kurt Aland did not place it in any of Categories of New Testament manuscripts.

It is dated by the Institute for New Testament Textual Research to the 7th or 8th century.

The codex used to be held in Qubbat al-Khazna in Damascus. The present location of the codex is unknown. The manuscript is not accessible.

== See also ==
- List of New Testament uncials
- Textual criticism
