= Giovanni Battista Varè =

Italian lawyer and politician (1817–1884)

Giovanni Battista Francesco Varé
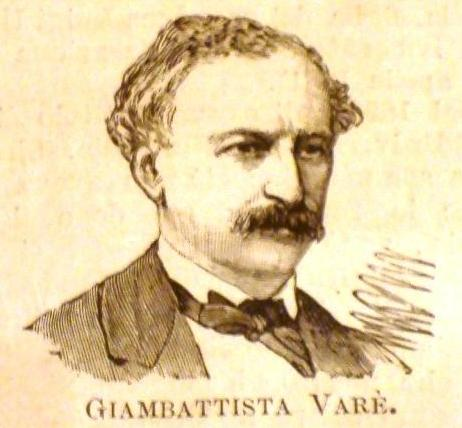

Minister of Justice
- In office 14 July 1879 – 25 November 1879
- Preceded by: Diego Tajani
- Succeeded by: Tommaso Villa

Vice-President of the Chamber of Deputies
- In office May 1880 – 20 January 1883

Member of the Chamber of Deputies
- In office 18 November 1865 – 13 February 1867
- In office 22 January 1871 – 20 January 1883

Giovanni Battista Varè (Venice, 12 September 1817 – Rome, 20 April 1884) was an Italian lawyer, politician and patriot.

== Biography ==
Varè took part in the anti-Austrian revolt of 1848 which led with Daniele Manin to the restoration of the Republic of San Marco and was a member of the Assembly of Deputies of the short-lived new republic.

After the restoration of Austrian government in Venice he fled to Switzerland where, in 1850, he became friends with Giuseppe Mazzini. The two collaborated on the newspaper L'Italia del Popolo. Mazzini also made use of his legal expertise in financial transactions, commissioning him to organize an international loan to support the Italian cause. The Swiss authorities became concerned about their country's neutrality vis-a-vis the neighboring Austrian Empire, revoked Varè's asylum and expelled him with a decree of 26 February 1851. He moved to Genoa, where he collaborated again with Mazzini on the newspaper Italia e Popolo. Soon the authorities there also opposed his stay and in September 1851 he moved to Turin.

After this he moved away from Mazzini and the radical nationalists, opposing the uprising in Genoa in June 1857, though he was briefly interned as a suspect along with his friend it:Domenico Giuriati.

He was first elected to the Chamber of Deputies of the Kingdom of Italy from the constituency of Portogruaro in 1866. After losing his seat in the next election he was re-elected for Palmanova in January 1871 and was elected vice president of the chamber. He was also briefly minister of justice in the second Cairoli government (14 July-25 November 1879).

== Personal life ==
On 23 July 1874, at St George's, Hanover Square, as "Giam Battista Varè, barrister, of Turin, Italy", Varè married Elizabeth Frances Chalmers, a daughter of John Inglis Chalmers. They were the parents of the diplomat and writer Daniele Varè.
