= Fifth di Rudinì government =

35th Government of Kingdom of Italy

Di Rudinì V government
- 35th Cabinet of Italy

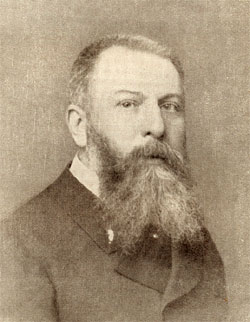
- Date formed: 1 June 1898
- Date dissolved: 29 June 1898

People and organisations
- Head of state: Umberto I
- Head of government: Antonio Starabba di Rudinì
- Total no. of members: 11
- Member party: Historical Right

History
- Predecessor: Di Rudinì IV Cabinet
- Successor: Pelloux I Cabinet

The Di Rudinì V government of Italy held office from 1 June 1898 until 29 June 1898, a total of 28 days.

== Government parties ==
The government was composed by the following parties:

Party	Ideology	Leader
Historical Left	Liberalism	Giovanni Giolitti
Historical Right	Conservatism	Antonio Starabba di Rudinì

== Composition ==
Office	Name	Party	Term
Prime Minister	Antonio Starabba di Rudinì	Historical Right	(1898–1898)
Minister of the Interior	Antonio Starabba di Rudinì	Historical Right	(1898–1898)
Minister of Foreign Affairs	Raffaele Cappelli	Historical Right	(1898–1898)
Minister of Grace and Justice	Teodorico Bonacci	Historical Left	(1898–1898)
Minister of Finance	Ascanio Branca	Historical Right	(1898–1898)
Minister of Treasury	Luigi Luzzatti	Historical Right	(1898–1898)
Minister of War	Alessandro Asinari di San Marzano	Military	(1898–1898)
Minister of the Navy	Felice Napoleone Canevaro	Military	(1898–1898)
Minister of Agriculture, Industry and Commerce	Antonio Starabba di Rudinì	Historical Right	(1898–1898)
Minister of Public Works	Achille Afan de Rivera	Historical Right	(1898–1898)
Minister of Public Education	Luigi Cremona	Historical Right	(1898–1898)
Minister of Post and Telegraphs	Secondo Frola	Historical Right	(1898–1898)
