= Alessandro Asinari di San Marzano =

Italian politician, general, and Senator of the Kingdom of Italy

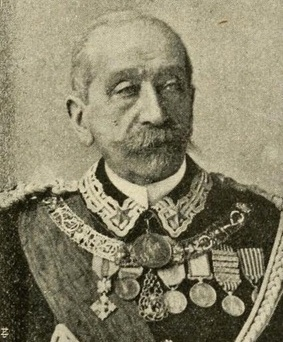

Minister of War
- In office December 14, 1897 – May 14, 1899
- Monarch: Umberto I
- Prime Minister: Francesco Crispi
- Preceded by: Luigi Pelloux
- Succeeded by: Giuseppe Mirri

Minister of the Navy
- In office May 24, 1898 – June 1, 1898
- Monarch: Umberto I
- Prime Minister: Francesco Crispi
- Preceded by: Benedetto Brin
- Succeeded by: Felice Napoleone Canevaro

Senator of the Kingdom of Italy

Personal details
- Born: March 20, 1830 Turin, Sardinia-Piedmont
- Died: June 5, 1906 (aged 55) Rome, Lazio, Italy
- Cause of death: Illness
- Relations: Guido Cipriano Asinari; Carolina Asinari of Bernezzo

Military service
- Allegiance: Sardinia-Piedmont; Kingdom of Italy
- Branch/service: Royal Sardinian Army; Royal Italian Army
- Years of service: 1848 – 1888
- Rank: Major General
- Battles/wars: First Italian War of Independence; Crimean War; Second Italian War of Independence: Battle of San Martino; Expedition of the Thousand: Battle of Castelfidardo; Siege of Gaeta; Third Italian War of Independence: Battle of Custoza; Capture of Rome; Italo-Ethiopian War of 1887–1889

Alessandro Asinari di San Marzano (1830–1906) was an Italian politician, general, and Senator of the Kingdom of Italy

== Biography ==
Born in Turin on March 20, 1830, Alessandro Asinari of San Marzano enrolled in the Turin military academy leaving it t the age of 18 with the rank of cavalry lieutenant. In 1848 he took part in the First Italian War of Independence. in which he distinguished himself particularly in the Battle of Santa Lucia and then took part in the Crimean War in which he was promoted to lieutenant.

In 1859 he took part in the Second Italian War of Independence, being promoted to captain and becoming part of the General Staff after the Battle of San Martino where he also earned the Silver Medal of Military Valor. After the Battle of Castelfidardo he was promoted to major for war merit and then fought in the Siege of Gaeta and that of Messina where he obtained the knight's cross of the Military Order of Savoy. In 1866 after the Armistice of Villafranca and the Battle of Custoza, he obtained the cross from Officer of the Military Order of Savoy and was promoted to colonel.

After taking part in the capture of Rome in 1870, in 1877 he was promoted to major general, then lieutenant general in 1883, until he obtained command of the Alexandria Division. In the colonial field he was governor of Massawa in Italian Eritrea from 1887 to 1888 and commander-in-chief of the great expeditionary force sent to East Africa after the Dogali disaster Battle of Dogali. San Marzano guided his troops with caution and successfully faced the Ethiopian army which eventually had to retreat due to logistical difficulties.

He was Minister of War in the Di Rudinì IV Cabinet, Di Rudinì V Cabinet, and Pelloux I Cabinet.

Deputy for two legislatures, he was appointed Senator of the Kingdom of Italy on January 4, 1894, but had to give it up shortly after due to poor health and advanced age. King Umberto I, who held him in great esteem, appointed him his secretary in the Order of Saints Maurice and Lazarus and later King Vittorio Emanuele III awarded him the collar of the Supreme Order of the Most Holy Annunciation.

He died in Rome after a long illness on February 16, 1906.

== Honors and awards ==
=== Italian ===
- Knight of the Supreme Order of the Most Holy Annunciation (2 June 1901)
- Knight Grand Cross with the Grand Cordon of the Order of Saints Maurice and Lazarus (2 June 1901)
- Knight Grand Cross of the Order of the Crown of Italy (2 June 1901)
- Officer of the Military Order of Savoy
- Silver Medal of Military Valor
- Maurician medal (for 10 lustrums of military service)
- Commemorative Medal of the African Campaigns
- Commemorative Medal of the Unity of Italy

=== Foreign ===
- Crimea Medal (United Kingdom)
- Commemorative medal of the 1859 Italian Campaign (Second French Empire)

== Bibliography ==
- ASINARI di San Marzano, Alessandro in Dizionario Biografico degli Italiani, vol. 4, Institute of the Italian Encyclopedia, 1962.
- Alessandro Asinari di San Marzano, on storia.camera.it, Chamber of Deputies
