= Uncial 0126 =

- New Testament manuscript
- Text: Mark 5-6 †
- Date: 8th-century
- Script: Greek
- Now at: Qubbat al-Khazna
- Size: 30 x 22 cm
- Type: mixed
- Category: III

Uncial 0126 (in the Gregory-Aland numbering), ε 36 (Soden), is a Greek uncial manuscript of the New Testament, dated palaeographically to the 8th century.

== Description ==
The codex contains a small part of the Gospel of Mark 5:34-6:2, on one parchment leaf (30 by 22 cm). The text is written in two columns per page, 24 lines per page, in large uncial letters.

The Greek text of this codex is a representative of the mixed text-type. Kurt Aland placed it in Category III.

It is dated by the Institute for New Testament Textual Research to the 8th-century.

The codex used to be held in Qubbat al-Khazna in Damascus. The present location of the codex is unknown.

The manuscript is cited in the Novum Testamentum Graece.

== See also ==
- List of New Testament uncials
- Textual criticism
