= Fourth di Rudinì government =

34th Government of Kingdom of Italy

Di Rudinì IV government
- 34th Cabinet of Italy

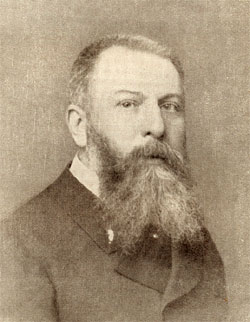
- Date formed: 14 December 1897
- Date dissolved: 1 June 1898

People and organisations
- Head of state: Umberto I
- Head of government: Antonio Starabba di Rudinì
- Total no. of members: 11
- Member party: Historical Right; Historical Left

History
- Predecessor: Di Rudinì III Cabinet
- Successor: Di Rudinì V Cabinet

The Di Rudinì IV government of Italy held office from 14 December 1897 until 1 June 1898, a total of 169 days, or 5 months and 18 days.

== Government parties ==
The government was composed by the following parties:

Party	Ideology	Leader
Historical Left	Liberalism	Giovanni Giolitti
Historical Right	Conservatism	Antonio Starabba di Rudinì

== Composition ==
Office	Name	Party	Term
Prime Minister	Antonio Starabba di Rudinì	Historical Right	(1897–1898)
Minister of the Interior	Antonio Starabba di Rudinì	Historical Right	(1897–1898)
Minister of Foreign Affairs	Emilio Visconti Venosta	Historical Right	(1897–1898)
Minister of Grace and Justice	Giuseppe Zanardelli	Historical Left	(1897–1898)
Minister of Finance	Ascanio Branca	Historical Right	(1897–1898)
Minister of Treasury	Luigi Luzzatti	Historical Right	(1897–1898)
Minister of War	Alessandro Asinari di San Marzano	Military	(1897–1898)
Minister of the Navy	Benedetto Brin	Military	(1897–1898)
Minister of the Navy	Alessandro Asinari di San Marzano	Military	(1898–1898)
Minister of Agriculture, Industry and Commerce	Francesco Cocco-Ortu	Historical Left	(1897–1898)
Minister of Public Works	Giuseppe Pavoncelli	Historical Right	(1897–1898)
Minister of Public Education	Nicolò Gallo	Historical Left	(1897–1898)
Minister of Post and Telegraphs	Emilio Sineo	Historical Right	(1897–1898)
Minister of Post and Telegraphs	Luigi Luzzatti	Historical Right	(1898–1898)
