= Uncial 0145 =

- New Testament manuscript
- Text: John 6:26-31
- Date: 7th century
- Script: Greek
- Now at: Qubbat al-Khazna
- Size: 24 x 19 cm
- Type: mixed
- Category: III

Uncial 0145 (in the Gregory-Aland numbering), ε 014 (Soden), is a Greek uncial manuscript of the New Testament, dated palaeographically to the 7th century.

== Overview ==
The codex contains a small part of the Gospel of John 6:26-31, on one parchment leaf (24 cm by 19 cm). It is written in one column per page, 18 lines per page, in uncial letters.

The Greek text of this codex is mixed. Kurt Aland placed it in Category III.

It is dated by the Institute for New Testament Textual Research to the 7th century.

The codex used to be held in Qubbat al-Khazna in Damascus. The location of the codex is unknown. The manuscript is not accessible.

== See also ==
- List of New Testament uncials
- Textual criticism
