= Second Pelloux government =

37th Government of Kingdom of Italy

Pelloux II government
- 37th Cabinet of Italy

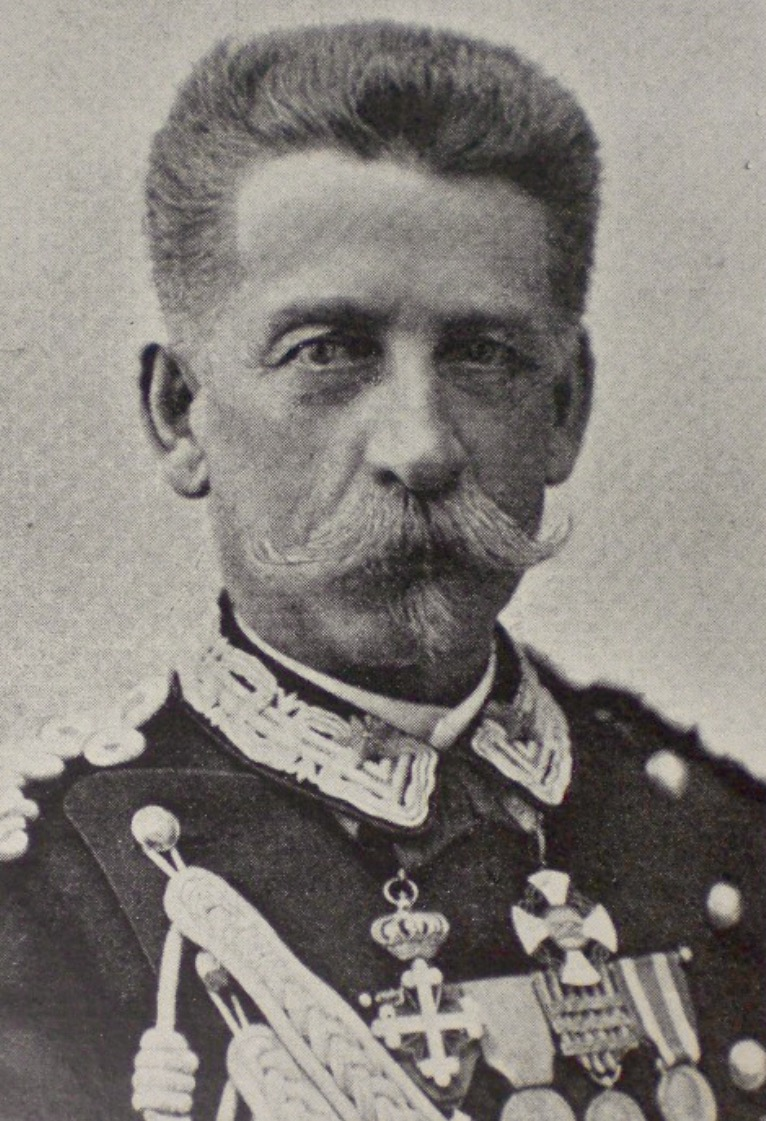
- Date formed: 14 May 1899
- Date dissolved: 24 June 1900

People and organisations
- Head of state: Umberto I
- Head of government: Luigi Pelloux
- Total no. of members: 11
- Member party: Historical Right; Historical Left

History
- Predecessor: Pelloux I Cabinet
- Successor: Saracco Cabinet

The Pelloux II government of Italy held office from 14 May 1899 until 24 June 1900, a total of 407 days, or 1 year, 1 month and 10 days.

== Government parties ==
The government was composed by the following parties:

Party	Ideology	Leader
Historical Left	Liberalism	Giovanni Giolitti
Historical Right	Conservatism	Antonio Starabba di Rudinì

== Composition ==
Office	Name	Party	Term
Prime Minister	Luigi Pelloux	Military	(1899–1900)
Minister of the Interior	Luigi Pelloux	Military	(1899–1900)
Minister of Foreign Affairs	Emilio Visconti Venosta	Historical Right	(1899–1900)
Minister of Grace and Justice	Adeodato Bonasi	Historical Right	(1899–1900)
Minister of Finance	Pietro Carmine	Historical Right	(1899–1900)
Minister of Treasury	Paolo Boselli	Historical Right	(1899–1900)
Minister of War	Giuseppe Mirri	Military	(1899–1900)
Minister of War	Luigi Pelloux	Military	(1900–1900)
Minister of War	Coriolano Ponza di San Martino	Military	(1900–1900)
Minister of the Navy	Giovanni Bettolo	Military	(1899–1900)
Minister of Agriculture, Industry and Commerce	Antonio Salandra	Historical Right	(1899–1900)
Minister of Public Works	Pietro Lacava	Historical Left	(1899–1900)
Minister of Public Education	Guido Baccelli	Historical Left	(1899–1900)
Minister of Post and Telegraphs	Antonino Paternò Castello	Historical Right	(1899–1900)
