= Tommaso Villa =

Italian lawyer and politician (1832–1915)

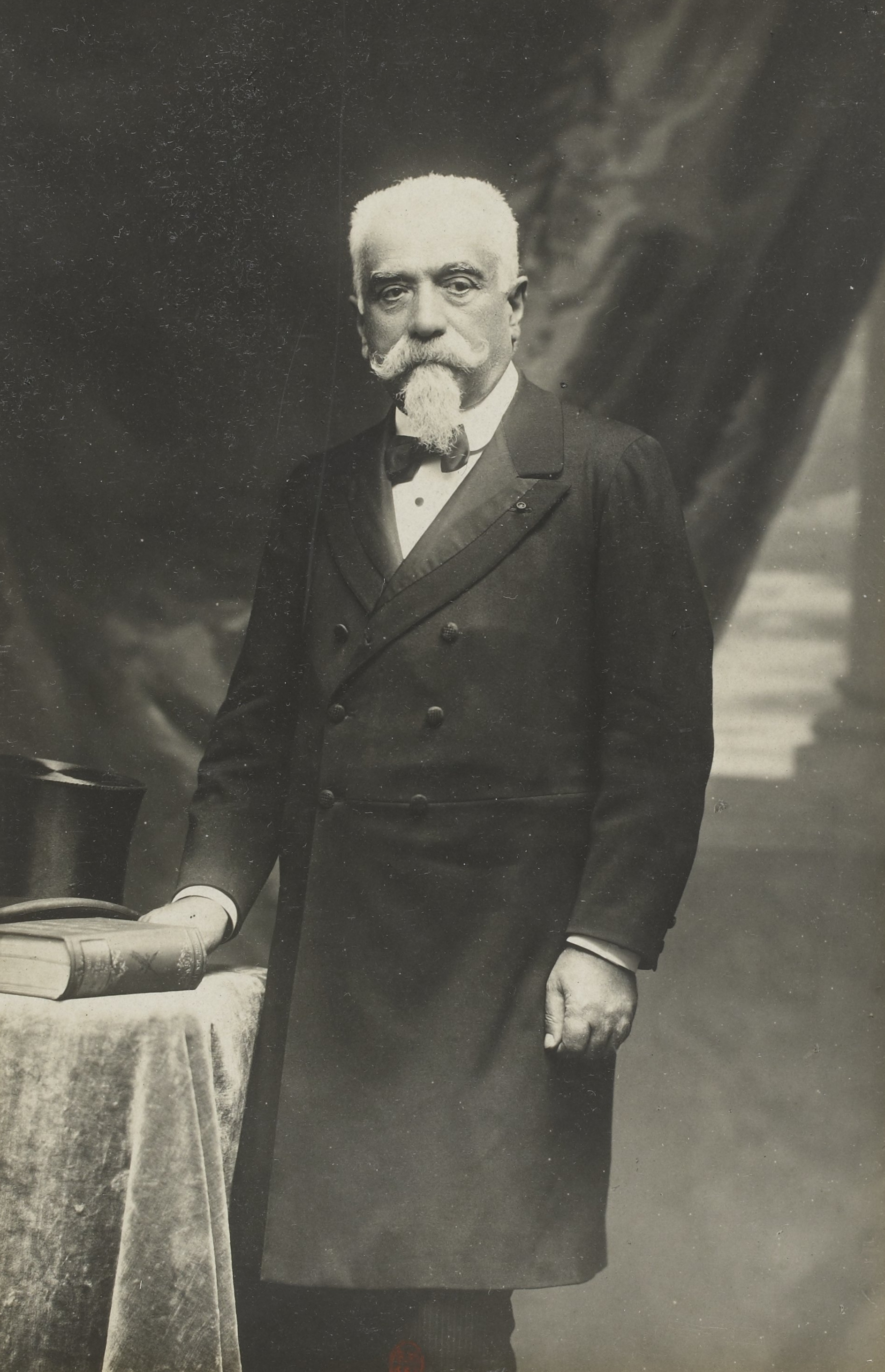

President of the Chamber of Deputies
- In office 10 June 1895 – 2 March 1897
- Preceded by: Giuseppe Biancheri
- Succeeded by: Giuseppe Zanardelli
- In office 28 June 1900 – 22 February 1902
- Preceded by: Nicolò Gallo
- Succeeded by: Giuseppe Biancheri

Senator
- In office 10 March 1909 – 24 July 1915

Minister of Justice
- In office 25 November 1879 – 29 May 1881
- Preceded by: Giovanni Battista Varè
- Succeeded by: Giuseppe Zanardelli

Minister of the Interior
- In office 14 July 1879 – 25 November 1879
- Preceded by: Agostino Depretis
- Succeeded by: Agostino Depretis

Tommaso Villa (Canale d'Alba, 29 January 1832 – Turin, 24 July 1915) was an Italian lawyer and politician.

== Early life and career ==
He was able to apply for university thanks to the scholarship from the College of the Provinces and in 1849 he enrolled in the faculty of law in Turin, from where he graduated in 1853. While still a student he collaborated with the periodical l'Eco delle provinciale, directed by Agostino Depretis.

As soon as he graduated, he interned at the office of the lawyer Angelo Brofferio, a prominent figure in the Turin political environment, a republican, opponent of Cavour and deputy. The marriage with Brofferio's daughter strengthened the relationship between the two.

He combined his activity as a lawyer with that of a political journalist, writing for two republican-area periodicals, Goffredo Mameli and Il Mago.

In March 1854 Villa was imprisoned for put up a poster calling for the abolition of the death penalty inside the Royal Palace. However his commitment to politics only took place after the brutal repression of demonstrations in September 1864 against the transfer of the capital from Turin to Florence. Villa provided legal assistance to many people involved in the unrest.

== Deputy and minister ==
In 1865 he entered politics and ran for election in the constituency of Villanova d'Asti, in opposition to Carlo Bon Compagni di Mombello. His candidacy wss supported by the Permanent Liberal Association, of which he was the founder and one of the most active members. On 22 October 1865 he was elected to the Chamber of Deputies of the Kingdom of Italy, where he was confirmed in 1867 and 1870 and where he aligned himself with the historical Left. He suffered an electoral defeat in November 1874, but in January of the following year he won the by-election held in San Daniele del Friuli to replace Federico Seismit-Doda. The victory of the left in the 1876 elections marked Villa's return to the constituency of Villanova d'Asti, where he would be re-elected until 1904.

On 8 March 1878 he held the position of Vice President of the Chamber of Deputies for the first time, which he left on 13 July 1879 to join the second Cairoli government, as Minister of the Interior (14 July - 25 November 1879). The reshuffle which saw the rapprochement of Depretis and Cairoli took him, on 25 November 1879, from the Interior to Justice (25 November 1879 – 29 May 1881). As minister he brought forward unsuccessful bills for the reform of the civil code and the introduction of divorce; he also issued a circular to provincial prefects asking them to curtail the activity of the Jesuits.

With the fall of the Government in 1881, Villa's ministerial career ended; However, he remained close to Benedetto Cairoli.

== President of the chamber ==
On 11 June 1886, with the support of the radical left, he was re-elected vice-president of the Chamber of Deputies, a position he held for three legislatures until 13 January 1895. In the 19th legislature he was elected President of the Assembly on 11 June 1895 and remained in office until 3 March 1897, when the legislature itself ended.

On 28 June 1900, the electoral victory of Luigi Pelloux's opponents and the rapprochement with Giovanni Giolitti of the Piedmontese delegation, of which Villa was part, brought him back to the Presidency of the Chamber, replacing it:Nicolò Gallo, who had been elected just twelve days earlier but then accepted a government position before taking up the Presidency. Immediately after the election, Villa appointed a commission responsible for drawing up within two days a bill restoring the liberal guarantees eliminated in 1899 and at the same time rationalizing parliamentary work. On 1 July the Chamber approved the new Regulations.

On 21 February 1902, after two votes in which blank ballots outnumbering preferences for Villa, he was re-elected to the Presidency, but believing that he did not enjoy the full confidence of the Assembly, he immediately resigned.

He was defeated in the general elections of 7 March 1909, but on the 10th of the same month he was nominated senator. In the Senate he was a member of the commission for the examination of the bill on Reform of the Code of Criminal Procedure (17 June 1909).

== Legal career and other activities ==
At the same time as his National political career he served on the municipal and provincial councils of Turin. He also worked as a lawyer and was involved in a number of high-profile court cases, including the trial if the suspects in the murder of it: Raffaele Sonzogno. As a member of the Council of the Turin Bar Association, on 9 August 1883 he expressed his opinion in favor of the registration of Lidia Poët, Italy's first woman lawyer.

In 1905, together with Herbert Asquith and Raymond Poincaré, he drafted a brief for the Cairo District Court in support of a claim by descendants of the Khedive Ismail for a share in the proceeds from the sale of his property.

A Freemason, he was expelled from the Grand Orient of Italy with it:Edoardo Daneo and others in 1906 "because he had sponsored a liberal-Catholic bloc to stem the advance of the socialists in Turin."

Villa played a leading role in organizing and promoting national and international exhibitions in his later years. These included the General Italian Exhibition held in Turin in 1884, General Italian Exhibition of 1898 and the Turin International in 1911.

== Honours ==
Cavaliere di Gran Croce decorato di Gran Cordone dell'Ordine dei Santi Maurizio e Lazzaro - ribbon for ordinary uniform

Knight Grand Cordon of the Order of Saints Maurice and Lazarus

Cavaliere di Gran Croce decorato di Gran Cordone dell'Ordine della Corona d'Italia - ribbon for ordinary uniform

Knight Grand Cross of the Order of the Crown of Italy
