= First Pelloux government =

36th Government of Kingdom of Italy

Pelloux I government
- 36th Cabinet of Italy

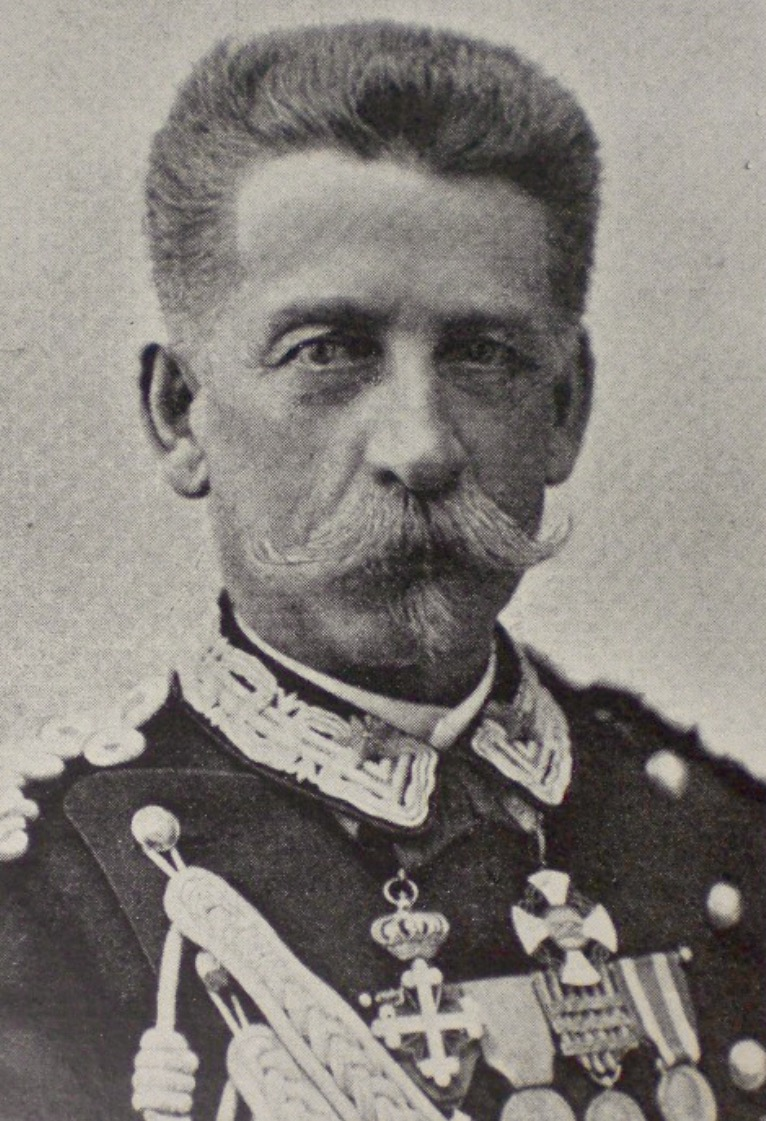
- Date formed: 29 June 1898
- Date dissolved: 14 May 1899

People and organisations
- Head of state: Umberto I
- Head of government: Luigi Pelloux
- Total no. of members: 11
- Member party: Historical Left

History
- Predecessor: Di Rudinì V Cabinet
- Successor: Pelloux II Cabinet

The Pelloux I government of Italy held office from 29 June 1898 until 14 May 1899, a total of 319 days, or 1 year and 15 days.

== Government parties ==
The government was composed by the following parties:

Party	Ideology	Leader
Historical Left	Liberalism	Giovanni Giolitti

== Composition ==
Office	Name	Party	Term
Prime Minister	Luigi Pelloux	Military	(1898–1899)
Minister of the Interior	Luigi Pelloux	Military	(1898–1899)
Minister of Foreign Affairs	Felice Napoleone Canevaro	Military	(1898–1899)
Minister of Grace and Justice	Camillo Finocchiaro Aprile	Historical Left	(1898–1899)
Minister of Finance	Paolo Carcano	Historical Left	(1898–1899)
Minister of Treasury	Pietro Vacchelli	Historical Left	(1898–1899)
Minister of War	Alessandro Asinari di San Marzano	Military	(1898–1899)
Minister of the Navy	Giuseppe Palumbo	Military	(1898–1899)
Minister of Agriculture, Industry and Commerce	Alessandro Fortis	Historical Left	(1898–1899)
Minister of Public Works	Pietro Lacava	Historical Left	(1898–1899)
Minister of Public Education	Guido Baccelli	Historical Left	(1898–1899)
Minister of Post and Telegraphs	Nunzio Nasi	Historical Left	(1898–1899)
