= Uncial 0144 =

- New Testament manuscript
- Text: Mark 6-7 †
- Date: 7th century
- Script: Greek
- Now at: Qubbat al-Khazna
- Size: 29 x 21 cm
- Type: unknown
- Category: none

Uncial 0144 (in the Gregory-Aland numbering), ε 012 (Soden), is a Greek uncial manuscript of the New Testament, dated palaeographically to the 7th century.

== Description ==
The codex contains a small part of the Mark 6:47-7:14, on two parchment leaves (29 cm by 21 cm). It is written in two columns per page, 28 lines per page, in uncial letters.

It is dated by the Institute for New Testament Textual Research to the 7th century.

The Greek text of this codex was not classified to any of four text-types. It was not placed it in Categories of New Testament manuscripts of Kurt Aland.

The codex used to be held in Qubbat al-Khazna in Damascus. The present location of the codex is unknown. The manuscript is not accessible.

== See also ==
- List of New Testament uncials
- Textual criticism
