= Giuseppe Mirri =

Italian politician and general

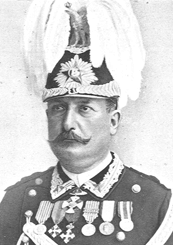

Member of the Chamber of Deputies
- In office 10 June 1886 – 22 October 1890

Senator
- In office 24 November 1898 – 5 September 1907

Minister of War
- In office 14 May 1899 – 7 January 1900

Giuseppe Mirri (Imola, 14 December 1834 – Bologna, 5 September 1907) was an Italian politician and general. A senator of the Kingdom of Italy, he was Minister of War in the Pelloux II government.

== Early life ==
Giuseppe was the son of Francesco Mirri and Giacoma Antolini. The revolutionary wave of 1848-49 left a mark on the young Mirri, who began to associate with democratic thinkers of his home region. His father, wanting him to follow a veterinary career, and trying to keep him away from radical circles, sent him to Rome in 1853 to join his brother Pietro who was studying architecture. There he met Francesca Scarsella, whom he married in 1861 and with whom he had, in 1862, his only daughter, Maria, who died four years later.

Due to his political associations he still managed to arouse the suspicions of the pontifical police and in 1856 he returned to Imola. In 1857 he moved to Turin to complete his studies, where his beliefs as a patriot were strengthened. He managed to maintain his political contacts thanks to his shipping business, which he started in Bologna in 1858. That soon failed however and he went into the hemp trade instead.

== Second Italian War of Independence ==
Upon the departure of the Austrians from Bologna, on 12 June 1859, Emilia-Romagna rebelled against the restoration of the Papal States and a corps of volunteers was formed in Imola. Mirri joined them and was given the rank of lieutenant on 5 July 1859, serving in the Rimini area. The volunteers were briefly incorporated into the regular army - on 1 October 1859 he entered the 26th Emilia infantry regiment and on the 1 January 1860 he was transferred to the 8th company of the 48th infantry regiment, Ferrara brigade. When the brigade was disbanded, Mirri resigned from the regiment.

On 2 July 1860 Mirri left for Sicily with the expedition led by Enrico Cosenz. Landing in Palermo on 6 July, he obtained command of the 1st Bersaglieri company in the Sicilian army of Garibaldi. He took part in the battle of Milazzo (20 July) where was slightly wounded and promoted to major. On 1 October, during the battle of Volturno, he distinguished himself but was wounded and taken prisoner. Taken to Gaeta and badly treated, he was released on 14 November 1860 thanks to an exchange of prisoners. In the following months he served in the Naples police and in January 1861 he was sent to Isernia to quell a peasant revolt led by Bourbon officers.

== Military and political career ==
Mirri joined the regular army in 1862. In 1866 he took part in the battle of Custoza in the 53rd grenadier regiment and then in the campaigns to repress brigandage (1868-69) and to deal with cholera in Sicily (1869). He commanded successively the Casale brigade (1883) and the Acqui (1887), the Ravenna division (1888), the military division of Bologna (1890) and finally the VI Army Corps (1893).

In 1886 he was elected deputy in the II constituency of Bologna with 4809 votes. However, he did not take an active part in parliamentary work and in 1889, after his promotion to lieutenant general, he opted for a military career. He stood again in the elections of 26 May 1895 in the constituencies of Imola and Budrio, but was defeated.

Having become a trusted associate of Francesco Crispi, in September 1894 Mirri was appointed extraordinary commissioner for Sicily, where in that period he commanded the XII Army Corps. Here he focused on combatting organized crime, which in his view was the main cause of deprivation among farmers and sulphur mine workers, whose working conditions he sought to improve. On Nov. 27. 1895 he was replaced in command of the XII Army Corps and resumed his place in the VI Corps.

In 1898 he held the position of extraordinary commissioner for the province of Bologna with extensive political and police powers. On 17 November of the same year he was appointed senator and the following May he entered the Pelloux cabinet as Minister of War.

== Later years ==
In 1899 he testified in Milan during the trial for the murder of Emanuele Notarbartolo. In the course of this he criticized the Palermo judiciary, and one of the prosecutors he called into question made public a letter from August 1895 in which Mirri had asked for a mafia member, Saladino, to be granted bail. This same Saladino was both a supporter of a pro-Crispi member of the Chamber of Deputies and implicated in the Notarbartolo.

In the ensuing scandal Mirri was forced to resign on 5 January 1900 and his political career was over. He returned to the military, succeeding Vittorio Emanuele III as commander of the X Army Corps and later given command of a possible expeditionary force to Cyrenaica. He was taken off active duty in February 1903 and retired in April 1907. He died a few months later in Bologna, where he had retired for health reasons.

== Honours ==
Grand Cordon of the Order of the Crown of Italy - ribbon for ordinary uniform

Grand Cordon of the Order of the Crown of Italy

Grand Officer of the Order of Saints Maurice and Lazarus - ribbon for ordinary uniform

Grand Officer of the Order of Saints Maurice and Lazarus

Knight of the Military Order of Savoy - ribbon for ordinary uniform

Knight of the Military Order of Savoy
