= Giuseppe Palumbo (admiral) =

Italian admiral and politician

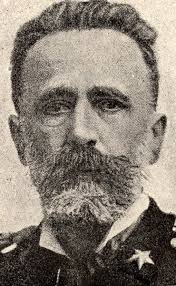

Minister of the Navy
- In office 29 June 1898 – 14 May 1899
- Preceded by: Felice Napoleone Canevaro
- Succeeded by: Giovanni Bettolo

Senator
- In office 23 March 1904 – 16 February 1913

Member of the Chamber of Deputies
- In office 21 March 1897 – 1 May 1902

Giuseppe Palumbo (Naples, 31 December 1840 – Naples, 16 February 1913) was an Italian admiral and politician. As a career member of the Regia Marina, he took part in the First and Second Italian Wars of Independence. He was later elected to the Chamber of Deputies of the Kingdom of Italy, then appointed to the Senate, and served as Minister of the Navy from 1898-99.

== Early life and career ==
Giuseppe Palumbo was admitted to the it: Real accademia di marina in 1851, from which he graduated in 1856 with the rank of ensign. He began his career in the navy of the Kingdom of the Two Sicilies, first on the Tancredi, and later on other Neapolitan ships.

He entered the Royal Navy and in December 1860 was promoted to the rank of lieutenant, taking part in the campaign in southern Italy of 1860-1861 and distinguishing himself in the sieges of Gaeta and Messina, earning a silver medal for military valor. He then participated in an educational cruise for officer candidates to South America, under the command of Admiral Simone Antonio Saint-Bon, aboard the frigate Principe Umberto in 1865-1866. They returned to Italy in time to take part in the battle of Lissa, where Palumbo distinguished himself in the rescue of the shipwrecked sailors from the Re d'Italia. The following September, on board the same ship, he was sent to Palermo to suppress the local anti-unity movement. Promoted to frigate captain in 1878, he obtained command of the gunboat Cariddi and in 1880 of the Agostino Barbarigo.

In 1882 he obtained command of the propeller-driven corvette Vettor Pisani with which he undertook a voyage to circumnavigate the globe lasting three years, being promoted to captain in 1883. The voyage was an important source of new scientific discoveries in the fields of hydrography, marine zoology and botany.

== Later naval career ==
Palumbo served as Chief of Staff of the Permanent Squadron from 17 December 1885 to 10 May 1886 and was awarded the rank of Rear Admiral on 28 December 1890. He was then Senior Commander of the Royal Crew Corps between 11 February 1891 and 22 January 1893 and was Commander of the Naval Academy from 1 December 1893 to 11 January 1895. The following year, on 9 April, he reached the rank of Vice Admiral, and was appointed Commander in Chief of the Mediterranean Naval Force on 1 May 1901, followed by the position of President of the Superior Naval Council which he held from 2 July 1903 to July 16, 1904.

In 1903 he made a diplomatic voyage to Istanbul on board the Agordat, together with eight other officials, to present gifts from king Victor Emmanuel III to sultan Abdul Hamid II.

Naval Career
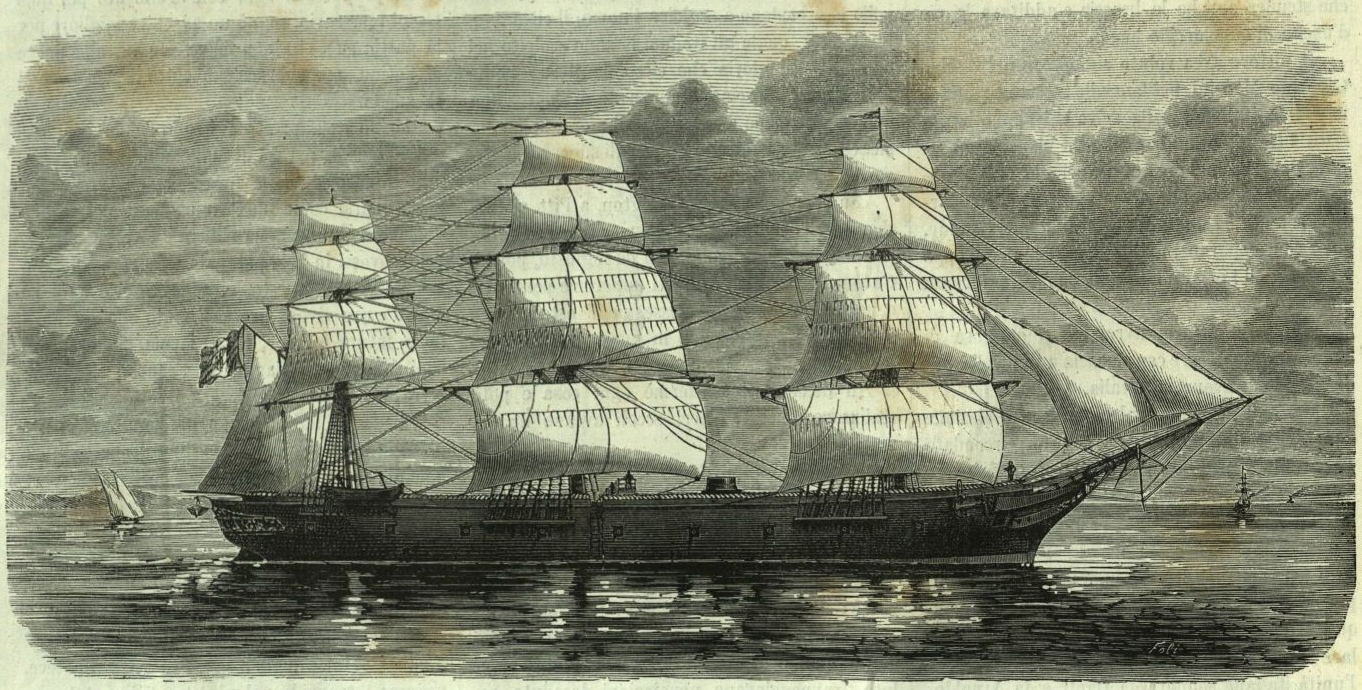
the Vettor Pisani

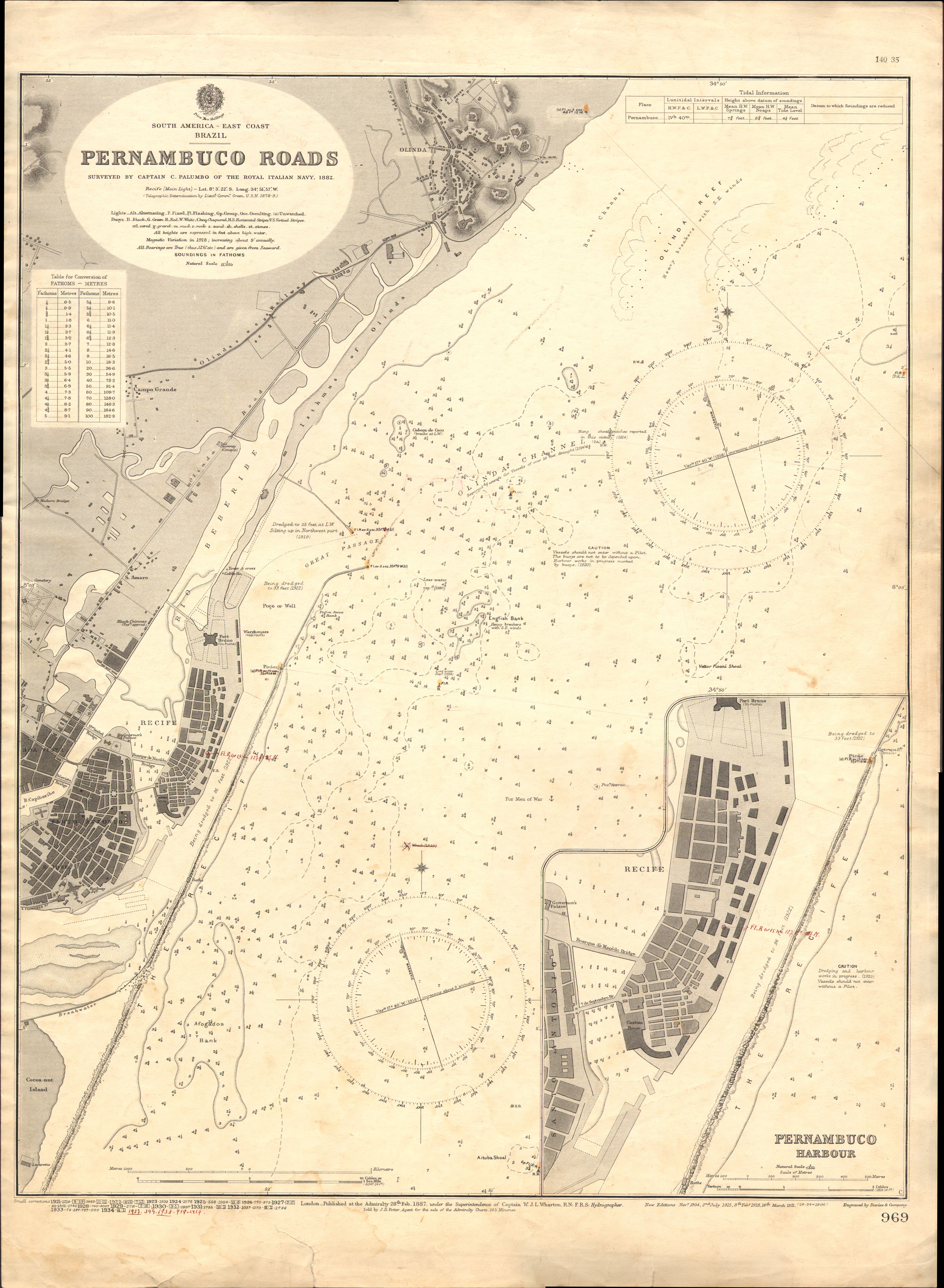
Nautical chart of Pernambuco Roads, Brazil, surveyed by Palumbo in 1882

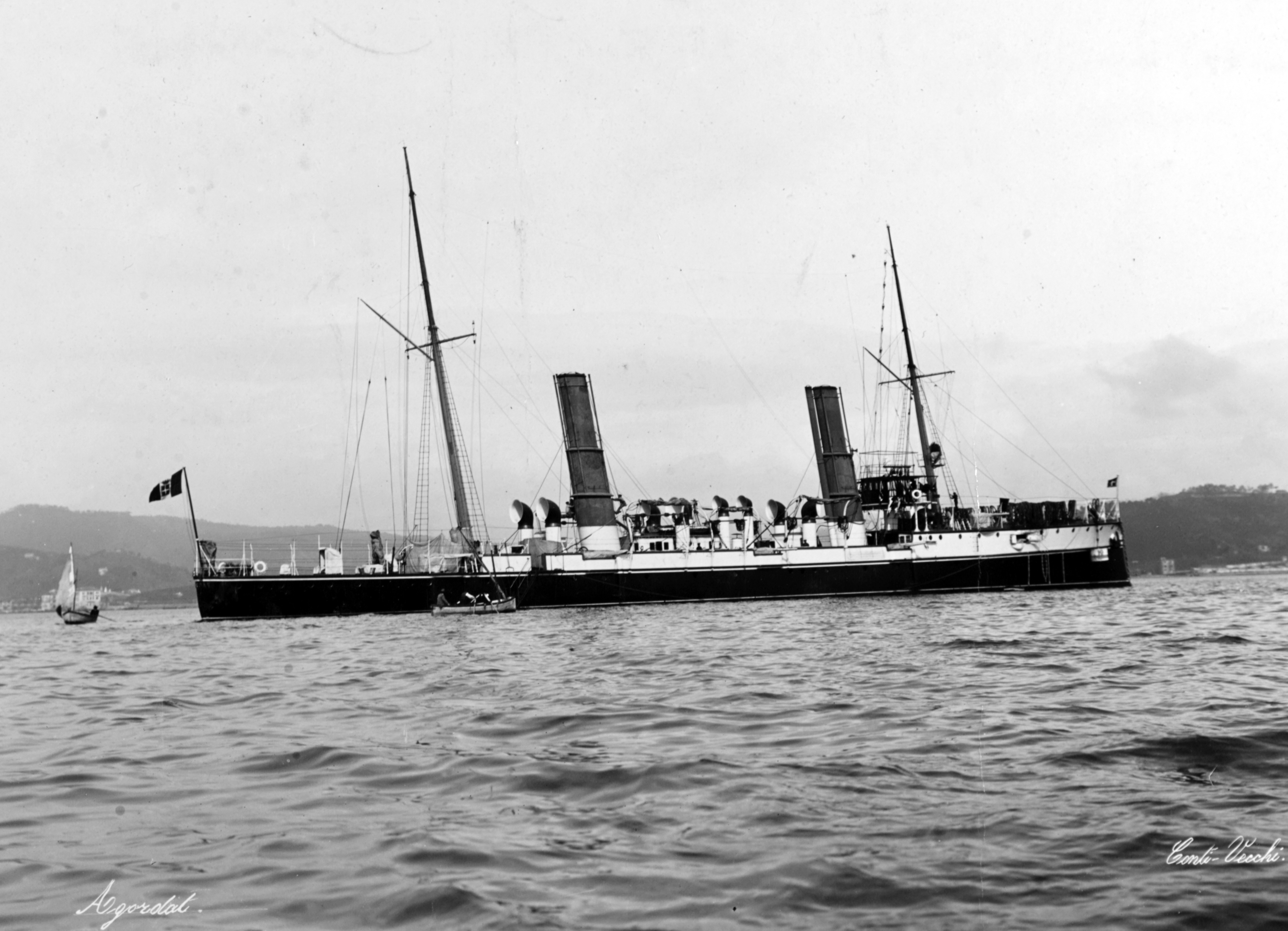
the Agordat

== Political career ==
Palumbo was elected as a deputy from the constituency of Castellammare di Stabia, serving from 1897 to 1902. He was then appointed a senator in 1904. He served for a while as undersecretary of state and was then Minister of the Navy in the first Pelloux government from 29 June 1898 to 14 May 1899.

On 1 January 1906 he retired due to age and was placed on the reserve list. He died in Naples in 1913.

== Honours ==
Silver Medal of Military Valor - ribbon for ordinary uniform

Silver Medal of Military Valor

Knight Grand Cross of the Order of the Crown of Italy - ribbon for ordinary uniform

Knight Grand Cross of the Order of the Crown of Italy
— 9 January 1904

Knight Grand Cross of the Order of Saints Maurice and Lazarus - ribbon for ordinary uniform

Knight Grand Cross of the Order of Saints Maurice and Lazarus
— 21 December 1905

Commander's Cross of the Royal Order of the Crown of Hawaii
— 1883
