= Qubbat al-Khazna =

Structure in Damascus, Syria

Coordinates: 33.511699°N 36.30608°E

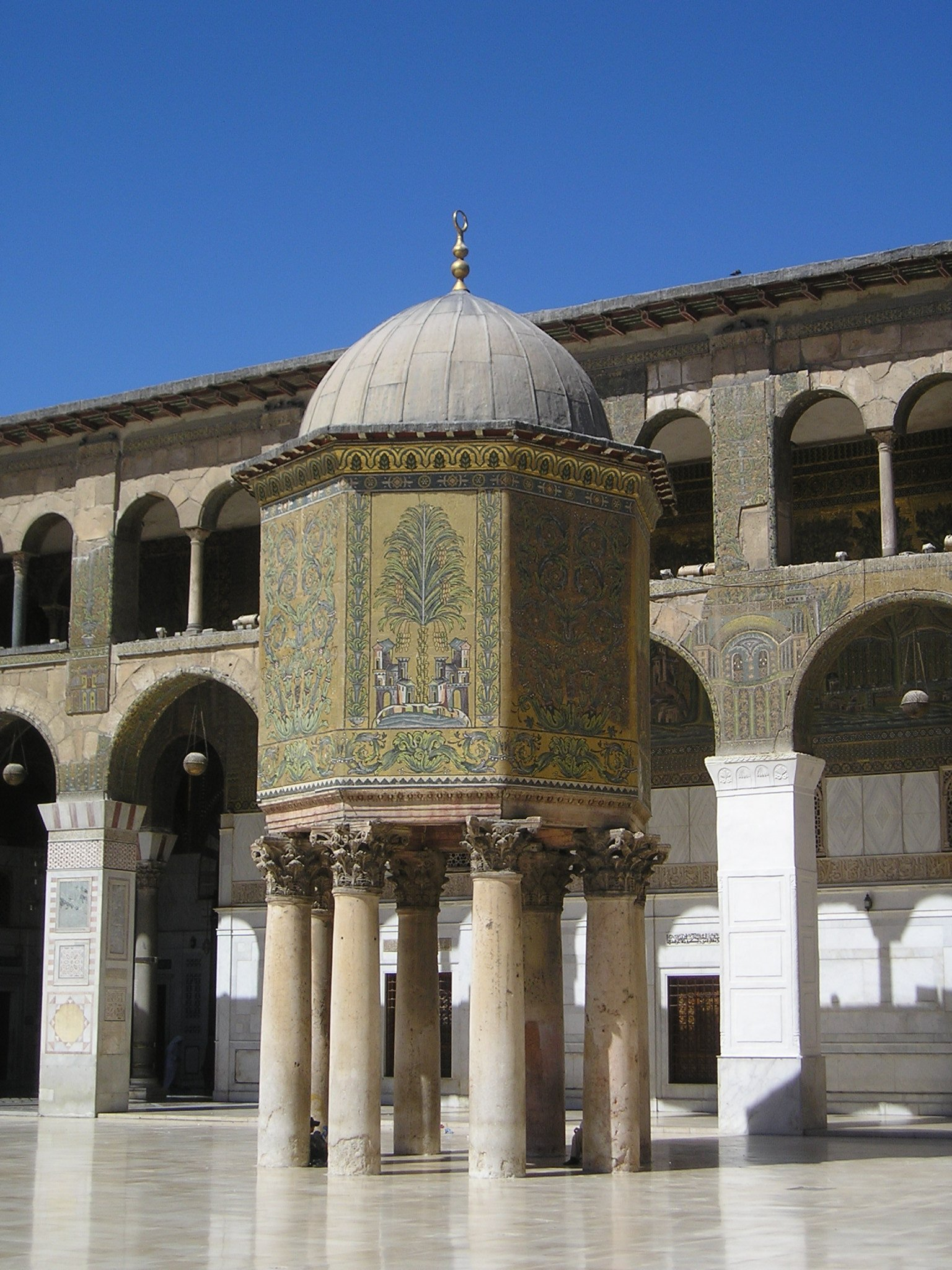
Overall view of the Qubbat al-Khazna in the courtyard of the Umayyad Mosque

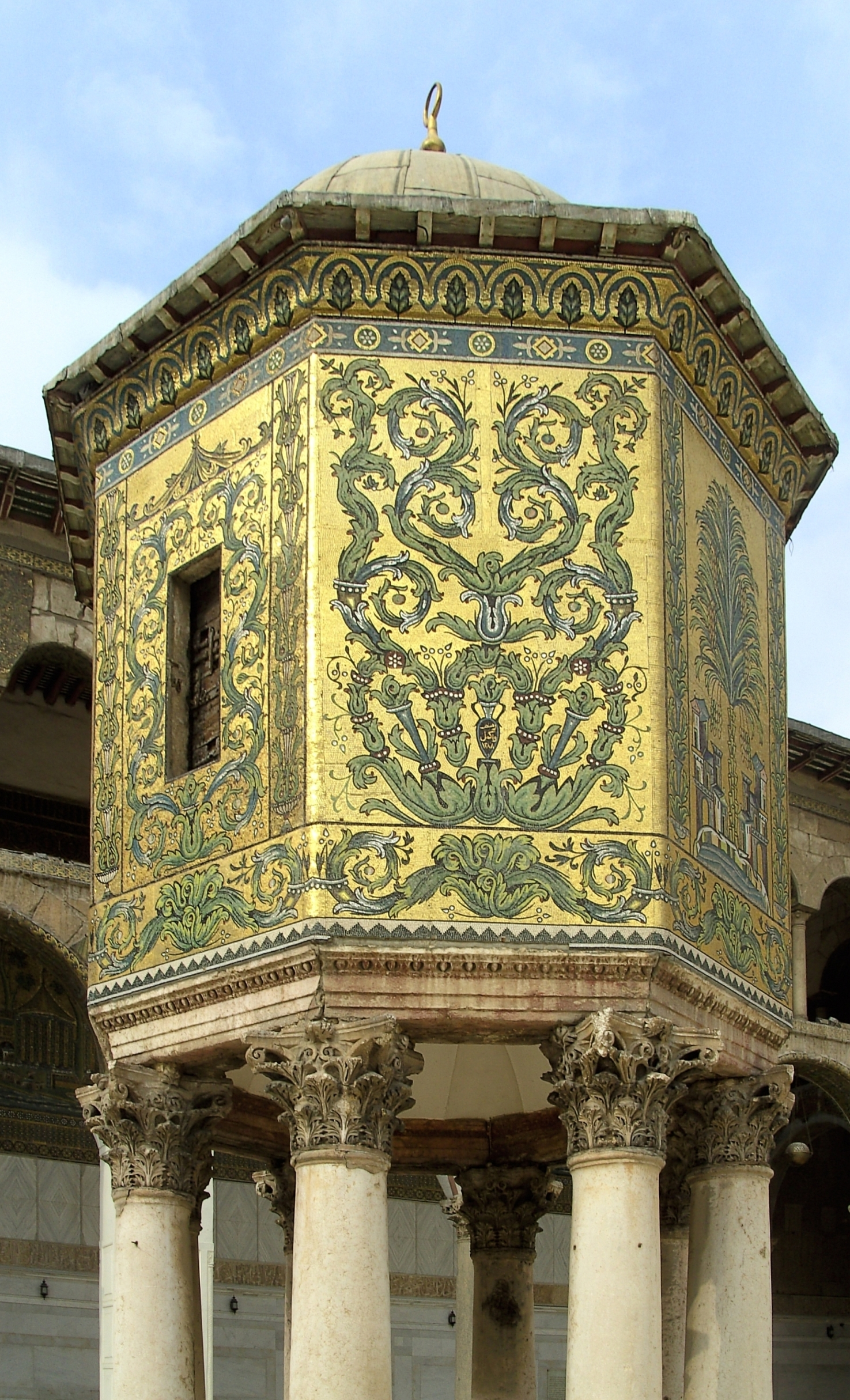
Close-up of the restored mosaics (2009 photo)

Qubbat al-Khazna (Arabic: قبة الخزنة, romanized: Qubbat al-Khaznah, lit. 'Dome of the Treasury'), also known as the Bayt al-Mal or Beit al-Mal, is an old structure within the courtyard of the Umayyad Mosque in Damascus, Syria. It is an octagonal structure decorated with mosaics, standing on eight Roman columns.

== Origins ==
The dome is most commonly thought to have been built under orders from the Abbasid governor of Damascus, Fadl ibn Salih in the late 8th century. This is based on the writings of later medieval Arabic writers, including Ibn Asakir, Al-Dhahabi, Ibn Kathir, and Ibn Taghrbirdi, though at least one historical Arabic writer, al-Badri (or Abu al-Tuqa), claimed that it was created in the reign of the earlier Umayyad caliph al-Walid (r. 705–715), who built the mosque. Depending on the source, the exact date of this construction varies and may have occurred under the Abbasid caliphs al-Mansur (r. 754–775), al-Mahdi (r. 775–785), or Harun al-Rashid (r. 786–809). Modern writer Ross Burns cites the year of construction as 789. Alain George argues that the structure may part of an earlier Christian-era structure that was subsequently appropriated and modified during the early Islamic period.

== Characteristics ==
The structure stands in the northwest corner of the mosque's courtyard. It is an octagonal chamber supported above the ground on eight columns. The Roman columns that were re-used for the structure's pillars were truncated to achieve the desired height but preserve original Roman-era capitals.

The exterior walls of the structure were originally covered in colorful mosaic decoration which imitated the earlier Umayyad-era mosaics in the rest of the mosque, although they are of slightly lesser quality than the latter. The mosaics were restored in 13th or 14th century and then in the late 20th century they were almost entirely redone based on existing fragments.

== Function ==
The dome used to hold the mosque's large endowments. Some Greek, Latin, Syriac, Coptic, Hebrew, Aramaic, and Georgian old manuscripts were also housed in Qubbat al-Khazna in the past (e.g. Uncial 0126, 0144, 0145). The manuscripts were generally kept out of view, but were allowed to be handled briefly by German scholars when German Emperor Wilhelm II visited Damascus in 1898.

== See also ==
- Ali Sami Bey, Ottoman photographer who took over 3,116 now-lost photographs of manuscript fragments from the collection.

== Bibliography ==
- Arianna D'Ottone, Manuscript as Mirror of a Multi-lingual and Multi-cultural Society. The case of the Damascus find, [in:] Convivencia in Byzantium? Cultural Exchanges in a Multi-Ethnic and Multi-Lingual Society, edited by B. Crostini-S. La Porta, Trier, Wissenschaftlicher Verlag Trier, 2013, pp. 63–88.
