= Nunzio Nasi =

Italian politician from Trapani, minister and parliamentarian

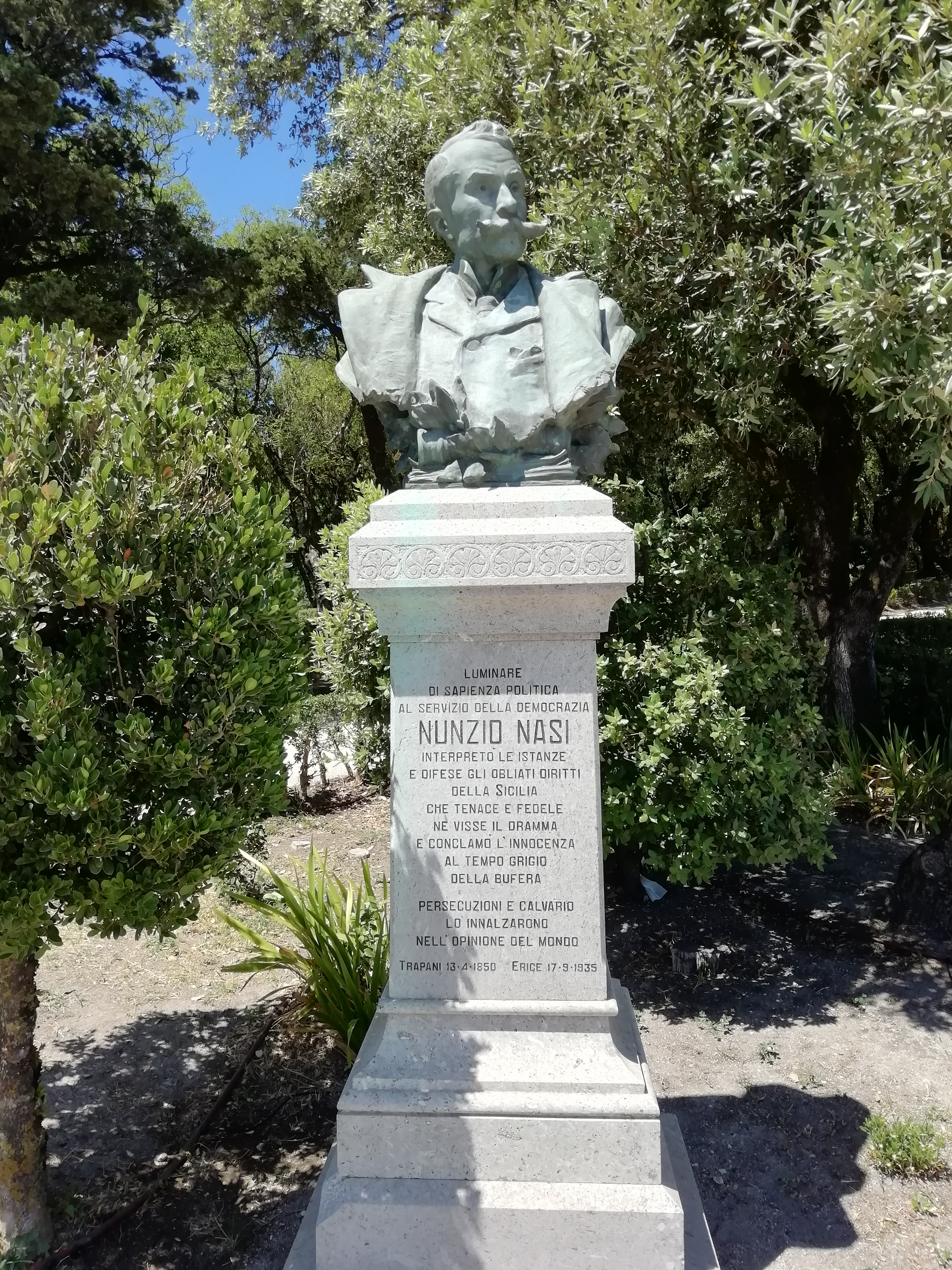
- Bust of Nunzio Nasi, Balio Gardens, Erice

Minister of Public Instruction
- In office 15 February 1901 – 3 November 1903
- Prime Minister: Giuseppe Zanardelli

Minister of Posts and Telegraphs
- In office 1898–1899
- Prime Minister: Luigi Pelloux

Personal details
- Born: April 1850 Trapani, Sicily, Kingdom of the Two Sicilies
- Died: 17 September 1935 (aged 85) Erice, Sicily, Kingdom of Italy
- Occupation: Politician

Nunzio Nasi (April 1850 – 17 September 1935) was an Italian liberal politician from Trapani, a long-serving deputy and twice a cabinet minister. He was at the centre of the Caso Nasi (1904–07), a corruption case, and later joined the Aventine secession to Fascism before losing his seat in 1926. He died in Erice in 1935.

== Notes ==
- Some sources give 2 April 1850 (Treccani) or 3 April 1850 (Camera dei deputati) as Nasi’s birth date; the bust in Erice’s Balio Gardens inscribes 13 April 1850.
