= Enrico Morin =

Italian military officer and politician (1841–1910)

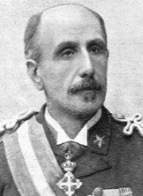

Personal details
- Born: Enrico Costantino Morin; 5 May 1841 Genao, Kingdom of Sardinia
- Died: 13 September 1910 (aged 69) Forte dei Marmi, Kingdom of Italy
- Occupation: Admiral

Enrico Morin (1841–1910) was an Italian admiral and politician who held several cabinet posts.

== Early life and education ==
Morin was born in Genoa on 5 May 1841. His father was an officer of the commissariat of the royal navy of the Kingdom of Sardinia.

Between 1852 and 1857 he attended the royal navy school in Genoa.

== Military and political career ==
Morin joined the campaign of 1860–1861 as a lieutenant. He was named the commanding officer of the steam frigate Giuseppe Garibaldi in a world tour that lasted from 1879 to 1882. He taught tactics and ballistics at the Genoa navy school and then taught naval art at the Turin war school. He was promoted to rear admiral in 1888 and served as the undersecretary of state at the Ministry of the Navy in two cabinets led by Prime Minister Francesco Crispi. Morin's first term was between 1893 and 1894, and his second term was from 1894 to 1896. He held the same post in the cabinet of Giuseppe Saracco (1900–1901) and also in the cabinet of Giuseppe Zanardelli (1901–1903). Morin also served as the ad interim minister of war from April 1902 and as the foreign minister in 1903 for a short time. From 1 February 1904 to 9 April 1905 he was commander-in-chief of the naval squadron in the Mediterranean, and then headed the maritime department of La Spezia.

== Later years and death ==
Morin retired from the navy in 1906. He died in Forte dei Marmi on 13 September 1910.

=== Awards ===
Morin was awarded the Honorary Knights Grand Cross of the Royal Victorian Order on 30 April 1903 while he was serving as foreign minister.
