= Sonnino (disambiguation) =

Sonnino may refer to:

- Sonnino, town and comune in the Lazio, central Italy
- Sonnino (surname), Italian surname
- Sonnino I Cabinet
- Sonnino II Cabinet
