= Severino Casana =

Italian engineer and politician (1842–1912)

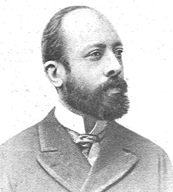

Minister of War
- In office 29 December 1907 – 10 December 1909
- Preceded by: Giuseppe Ettore Viganò
- Succeeded by: Paolo Spingardi

Senator
- In office 1 May 1898 – 19 October 1912

Mayor of Turin
- In office 13 April 1898 – 23 August 1902
- Preceded by: it:Felice Rignon
- Succeeded by: Alfonso Badini Confalonieri

Member of the Chamber of Deputies
- In office 18 May 1890 – 16 April 1898
- Constituency: Novara (1890-92)
- Constituency: Pallanza (1892-98)

Severino Ignazio Elleno Maria, Count of Casana (better known as Severino Casana (Turin, 23 October 1842 – Montalto Dora, 19 October 1912) was an Italian engineer and politician, mayor of Turin from 1898 to 1902, member of the Chamber of Deputies of the Kingdom of Italy from 1886 to 1897, senator from 1898 to 1912, minister of war from 1907 to 1909, and vice president of the Senate in 1912.

== Biography ==
Severino was the son of the Turin banker Alessandro Casana (appointed baron in 1853) and Teresa Cobianchi, sister of the businessman and philanthropist it:Lorenzo Cobianchi.

In 1863 he graduated in civil engineering, subsequently working at the Società per le Strade Ferrate Meridionali from 1865 to 1868, when he launched his own professional practice as an engineer and architect. From 1875 to 1881 he was assistant to the chair of architecture at the Applied School for Engineers of Turin (now the Polytechnic University of Turin); in 1881 he was appointed dean of architecture, a position he held until 1891. He was one of the leading European experts of his time on railway issues.

In 1873 he married Teresa Giovanna Maria Cristina Ceriana, daughter of the banker Vincenzo Ceriana.

On the death of his uncle Lorenzo in 1881, he inherited the Intra cotton mills and the Possaccio paper mill together with his brother Ernesto. From 1885 he was the owner of Montalto Dora Castle, which he began restoring in 1890 with the assistance of the architect and archaeologist Alfredo d'Andrade.

== Political career ==
He served as a city councilor of Turin from 1883, and was also elected to the Chamber of Deputies from 1890 to 1898. In 1898, having been chosen as mayor of Turin, he left the Chamber of Deputies but soon after on 1 May 1898 he was appointed senator.

As a senator he served as a member of the parliamentary commission of inquiry into the army, established by Prime Minister Giolitti to examine whether the army’s demands for higher military spending were justified. Previous governments had kept defence budgets low, but the army claimed much higher sums were required. However many left-wing deputies in the chamber believed that there was rampant corruption in the armed forces, including collusion with military suppliers to keep prices high - this had led to the resignation of Navy Minister Giovanni Bettolo in 1903 - and would not vote for increases in expenditure unless there they could be assured that nothing improper would be done with the funds.

Giolitti ensured that the Commission of Inquiry was made up of reliable and independent men like Casana who had no military experience. The Commission expanded its investigation by seeking to determine what level of funding was necessary to secure a reliable military for the country, and what reforms the army itself might require. Its conclusion was that the existing military organisation was fit for purpose, and simply needed better funding. By the time it reached this conclusion however, Giolitti had invited Casana to serve as War Minister and he had resigned from it.

Casana was minister of war from 1907 to 1909 in the third Giolitti government, the first civilian war minister in the Kingdom of Italy. His appointment as a civilian was a concession to the left by Giolitti, who hoped thereby to strengthen parliamentary control over the army. However the most significant act of his period of office was laying a bill before Parliament in June 1908 for extraordinary expenditure of L. 223,000,000 for the army over the ten years 1907-1917, mainly intended for the renewal of artillery, fortifications and roads.

The other reform Casana initiated was an expansion of the Supreme Defence Commission, adding himself and the Navy Minister and giving the chair to the Prime Minister. The longstanding lack of coordination between the government and the army remained however; while the ministers answered to parliament, the Army and Navy Chiefs of Staff reported directly to the king. The reformed Supreme Defence Commission apparently met only twice before Italy entered the First World War.

== Honours ==
Cavaliere di Gran Croce decorato con Gran Cordone dell'Ordine dei Santi Maurizio e Lazzaro - ribbon for ordinary uniform

Grand Cordon of the Order of Saints Maurice and Lazarus

Cavaliere di Gran Croce decorato con Gran cordone dell'Ordine della Corona d'Italia - ribbon for ordinary uniform

Grand Cordon of the Order of the Crown of Italy

Commendatore dell'Ordine della Legion d'Onore (Francia) - ribbon for ordinary uniform

Commander of the Legion d’Honneur (France)

Cavaliere dell'Ordine della Corona di Prussia (Impero Tedesco) - ribbon for ordinary uniform

Knight of the Order of the Crown of Prussia (German Empire)
