= Tittoni government =

41st Government of Kingdom of Italy

- 41st Cabinet of Italy

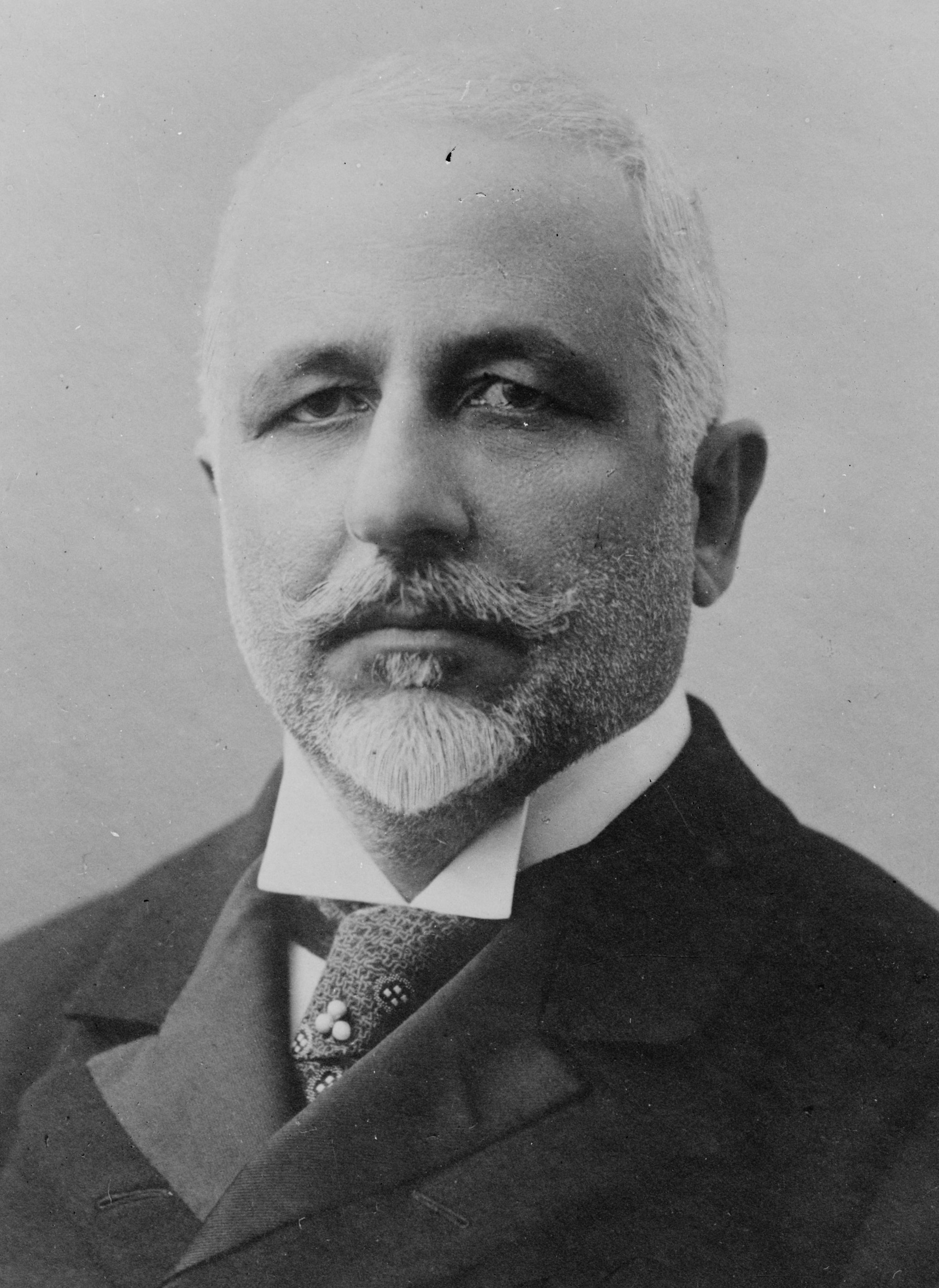
- Date formed: 12 March 1905
- Date dissolved: 28 March 1905

People and organisations
- Head of state: Victor Emmanuel III
- Head of government: Tommaso Tittoni
- Total no. of members: 11
- Member party: Historical Left; Historical Right

History
- Predecessor: Giolitti II Cabinet
- Successor: Fortis I Cabinet

The Tittoni government of Italy held office from 12 March until 28 March 1905, a total of 16 days. It is the shortest ever government in the history of Italy.

== Government parties ==
The government was composed by the following parties:

| Party | Ideology | Leader |
|---|---|---|
| Historical Left | Liberalism | Giovanni Giolitti |
| Historical Right | Conservatism | Tommaso Tittoni |

== Composition ==
| Office | Name | Party | Term |
|---|---|---|---|
| Prime Minister | Tommaso Tittoni | Historical Right | (1905–1905) |
| Minister of the Interior | Tommaso Tittoni | Historical Right | (1905–1905) |
| Minister of Foreign Affairs | Tommaso Tittoni | Historical Right | (1905–1905) |
| Minister of Grace and Justice | Scipione Ronchetti | Historical Left | (1905–1905) |
| Minister of Finance | Angelo Majorana | Historical Left | (1905–1905) |
| Minister of Treasury | Luigi Luzzatti | Historical Right | (1905–1905) |
| Minister of War | Ettore Pedotti | Military | (1905–1905) |
| Minister of the Navy | Carlo Mirabello | Military | (1905–1905) |
| Minister of Agriculture, Industry and Commerce | Luigi Rava | Historical Left | (1905–1905) |
| Minister of Public Works | Francesco Tedesco | Historical Left | (1905–1905) |
| Minister of Public Education | Vittorio Emanuele Orlando | Historical Left | (1905–1905) |
| Minister of Post and Telegraphs | Francesco Tedesco | Historical Left | (1905–1905) |
