= First Fortis government =

42nd Government of Kingdom of Italy

Fortis I government
- 42nd Cabinet of Italy

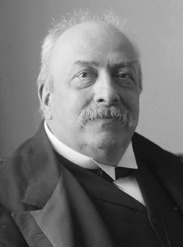
- Date formed: 28 March 1905
- Date dissolved: 24 December 1905

People and organisations
- Head of state: Victor Emmanuel III
- Head of government: Alessandro Fortis
- Total no. of members: 11
- Member party: Historical Left; Historical Right

History
- Predecessor: Tittoni Cabinet
- Successor: Fortis II Cabinet

The Fortis I government of Italy held office from 28 March until 24 December 1905, a total of 271 days, or 8 months and 26 days.

== Government parties ==
The government was composed by the following parties:

| Party | Ideology | Leader |
|---|---|---|
| Historical Left | Liberalism | Giovanni Giolitti |
| Historical Right | Conservatism | Tommaso Tittoni |

== Composition ==
| Office | Name | Party | Term |
|---|---|---|---|
| Prime Minister | Alessandro Fortis | Historical Left | (1905–1905) |
| Minister of the Interior | Tommaso Tittoni | Historical Right | (1905–1905) |
| Minister of Foreign Affairs | Alessandro Fortis | Historical Left | (1905–1905) |
| Minister of Grace and Justice | Camillo Finocchiaro Aprile | Historical Left | (1905–1905) |
| Minister of Finance | Angelo Majorana | Historical Left | (1905–1905) |
| Minister of Treasury | Paolo Carcano | Historical Left | (1905–1905) |
| Minister of War | Ettore Pedotti | Military | (1905–1905) |
| Minister of the Navy | Carlo Mirabello | Military | (1905–1905) |
| Minister of Agriculture, Industry and Commerce | Luigi Rava | Historical Left | (1905–1905) |
| Minister of Public Works | Carlo Ferraris | Historical Left | (1905–1905) |
| Minister of Public Education | Leonardo Bianchi | Historical Left | (1905–1905) |
| Minister of Post and Telegraphs | Gismondo Morelli Gualtierotti | Historical Left | (1905–1905) |
