= Sonnino (surname) =

Sonnino is an Italian surname. Notable people with the surname include:

- Sidney Sonnino (1847–1922), Italian statesman
- Giorgio Sonnino (1844–1921), a senator of the Kingdom of Italy

== See also ==
- Sonnino
- Sonnino I Cabinet
- Sonnino II Cabinet
