= Second Giolitti government =

40th Government of Kingdom of Italy

Giolitti II government
- 40th Cabinet of Italy

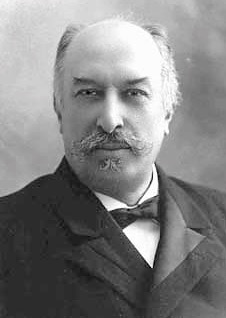
- Date formed: 3 November 1903
- Date dissolved: 12 March 1905

People and organisations
- Head of state: Victor Emmanuel III
- Head of government: Giovanni Giolitti
- Total no. of members: 11
- Member party: Historical Left; Historical Right

History
- Predecessor: Zanardelli Cabinet
- Successor: Tittoni Cabinet

The Giolitti II government of Italy held office from 3 November 1903 until 12 March 1905, a total of 499 days, or 1 year, 4 months and 13 days.

== Government parties ==
The government was composed by the following parties:

| Party | Ideology | Leader |
|---|---|---|
| Historical Left | Liberalism | Giovanni Giolitti |
| Historical Right | Conservatism | Tommaso Tittoni |

The cabinet was externally supported by the Italian Socialist Party.

== Composition ==
| Office | Name | Party | Term |
|---|---|---|---|
| Prime Minister | Giovanni Giolitti | Historical Left | (1903–1905) |
| Minister of the Interior | Giovanni Giolitti | Historical Left | (1903–1905) |
| Minister of Foreign Affairs | Tommaso Tittoni | Historical Right | (1903–1905) |
| Minister of Grace and Justice | Scipione Ronchetti | Historical Left | (1903–1905) |
| Minister of Finance | Pietro Rosano | Historical Left | (1903–1903) |
| Minister of Finance | Luigi Luzzatti | Historical Right | (1903–1904) |
| Minister of Finance | Angelo Majorana | Historical Left | (1904–1905) |
| Minister of Treasury | Luigi Luzzatti | Historical Right | (1903–1905) |
| Minister of War | Ettore Pedotti | Military | (1903–1905) |
| Minister of the Navy | Carlo Mirabello | Military | (1903–1905) |
| Minister of Agriculture, Industry and Commerce | Luigi Rava | Historical Left | (1903–1905) |
| Minister of Public Works | Francesco Tedesco | Historical Left | (1903–1905) |
| Minister of Public Education | Vittorio Emanuele Orlando | Historical Left | (1903–1905) |
| Minister of Post and Telegraphs | Enrico Stelluti Scala | Historical Left | (1903–1904) |
| Minister of Post and Telegraphs | Francesco Tedesco | Historical Left | (1904–1905) |
