= Third Giolitti government =

45th Government of Kingdom of Italy

Giolitti III government
- 45th Cabinet of Italy

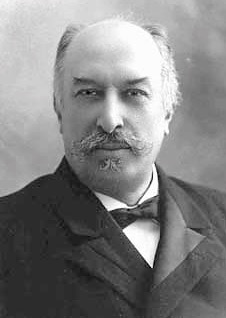
- Date formed: 29 May 1906
- Date dissolved: 11 December 1909

People and organisations
- Head of state: Victor Emmanuel III
- Head of government: Giovanni Giolitti
- Total no. of members: 11
- Member party: Historical Left; Historical Right

History
- Predecessor: Sonnino I Cabinet
- Successor: Sonnino II Cabinet

The Giolitti III government of Italy held office from 29 May 1906 until 11 December 1909, a total of 1,292 days, or 3 years, 6 months and 12 days; it was one of the longest cabinet in the history of the Kingdom of Italy.

== Government parties ==
The government was composed by the following parties:

Party	Ideology	Leader
Historical Left	Liberalism	Giovanni Giolitti
Historical Right	Conservatism	Sidney Sonnino

== Composition ==
Office	Name	Party	Term
Prime Minister	Giovanni Giolitti	Historical Left	(1906–1909)
Minister of the Interior	Giovanni Giolitti	Historical Left	(1906–1909)
Minister of Foreign Affairs	Tommaso Tittoni	Historical Right	(1906–1909)
Minister of Grace and Justice	Nicolò Gallo	Historical Left	(1906–1907)
Minister of Grace and Justice	Vittorio Emanuele Orlando	Historical Left	(1907–1909)
Minister of Finance	Fausto Massimini	Historical Left	(1906–1907)
Minister of Finance	Angelo Majorana	Historical Left	(1907–1907)
Minister of Finance	Pietro Lacava	Historical Left	(1907–1909)
Minister of Treasury	Angelo Majorana	Historical Left	(1906–1907)
Minister of Treasury	Paolo Carcano	Historical Left	(1907–1907)
Minister of War	Giuseppe Ettore Viganò	Military	(1906–1907)
Minister of War	Severino Casana	Historical Right	(1907–1909)
Minister of the Navy	Carlo Mirabello	Military	(1906–1909)
Minister of Agriculture, Industry and Commerce	Francesco Cocco-Ortu	Historical Left	(1906–1909)
Minister of Public Works	Emanuele Gianturco	Historical Left	(1906–1907)
Minister of Public Works	Pietro Bertolini	Historical Left	(1907–1909)
Minister of Public Education	Guido Fusinato	Historical Left	(1906–1906)
Minister of Public Education	Luigi Rava	Historical Left	(1906–1909)
Minister of Post and Telegraphs	Carlo Schanzer	Historical Right	(1906–1909)
