= Second Fortis government =

43rd Government of Kingdom of Italy

Fortis II government
- 43rd Cabinet of Italy

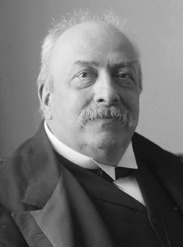
- Date formed: 24 December 1905
- Date dissolved: 8 February 1906

People and organisations
- Head of state: Victor Emmanuel III
- Head of government: Alessandro Fortis
- Total no. of members: 11
- Member party: Historical Left; Historical Right

History
- Predecessor: Fortis I Cabinet
- Successor: Sonnino I Cabinet

The Fortis II government of Italy held office from 24 December 1905 until 8 February 1906, a total of 46 days, or 1 month and 15 days.

== Government parties ==
The government was composed by the following parties:

Party	Ideology	Leader
Historical Left	Liberalism	Giovanni Giolitti
Historical Right	Conservatism	Tommaso Tittoni

== Composition ==
Office	Name	Party	Term
Prime Minister	Alessandro Fortis	Historical Left	(1905–1906)
Minister of the Interior	Alessandro Fortis	Historical Left	(1905–1906)
Minister of Foreign Affairs	Antonio Paternò Castello	Historical Right	(1905–1906)
Minister of Grace and Justice	Camillo Finocchiaro Aprile	Historical Left	(1905–1906)
Minister of Finance	Pietro Vacchelli	Historical Left	(1905–1906)
Minister of Treasury	Paolo Carcano	Historical Left	(1905–1906)
Minister of War	Luigi Majnoni d'Intignano	Military	(1905–1906)
Minister of the Navy	Carlo Mirabello	Military	(1905–1906)
Minister of Agriculture, Industry and Commerce	Nerio Malvezzi de' Medici	Historical Right	(1905–1906)
Minister of Public Works	Francesco Tedesco	Historical Right	(1905–1906)
Minister of Public Education	Errico De Marinis	Historical Left	(1905–1906)
Minister of Post and Telegraphs	Ignazio Marsengo-Bastia	Historical Left	(1905–1906)
