= Luzzatti government =

47th Government of Kingdom of Italy

- 47th Cabinet of Italy

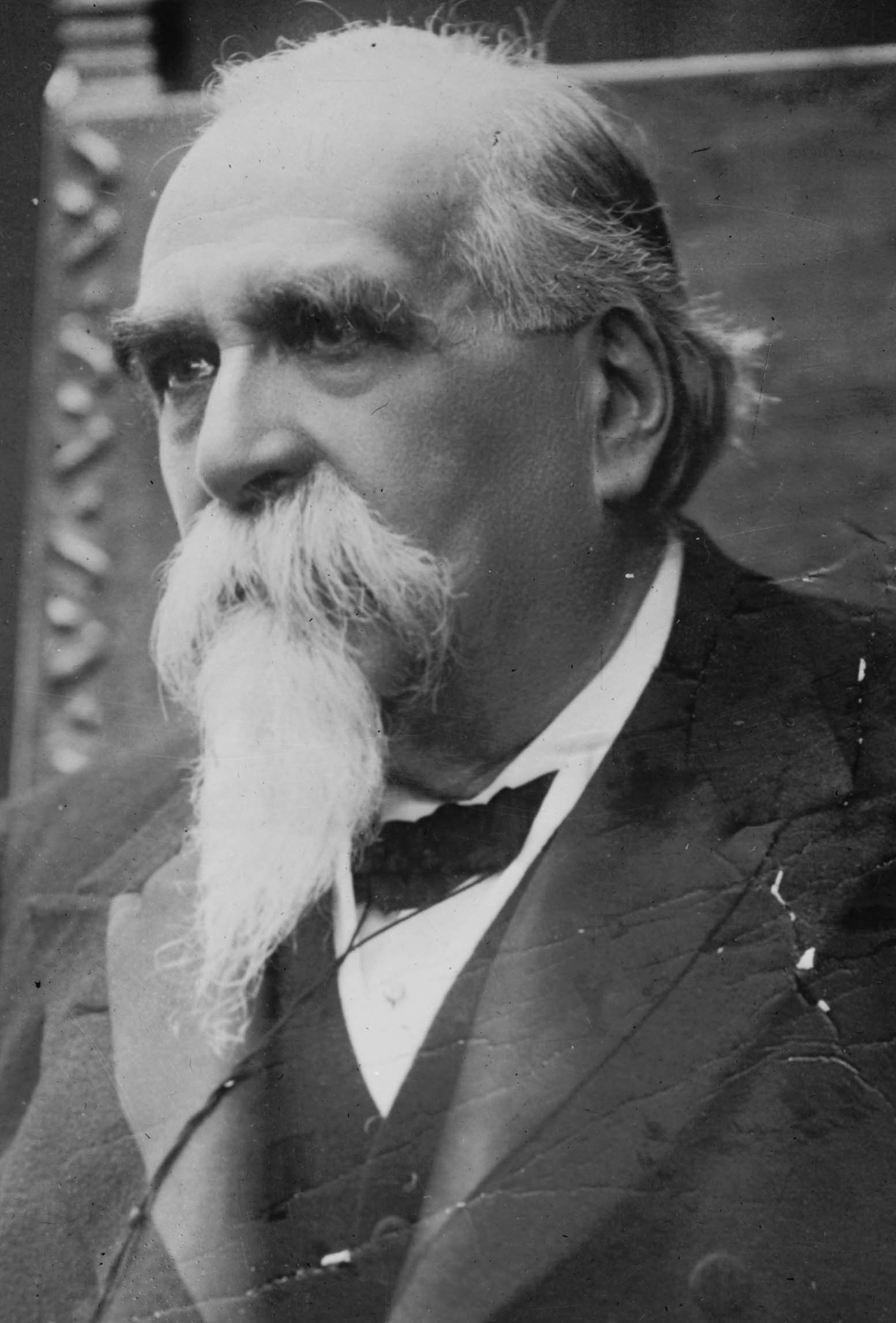
- Date formed: 31 March 1910
- Date dissolved: 29 March 1911

People and organisations
- Head of state: Victor Emmanuel III
- Head of government: Luigi Luzzatti
- Total no. of members: 11
- Member party: Historical Left; Historical Right; Italian Radical Party

History
- Predecessor: Sonnino II Cabinet
- Successor: Giolitti IV Cabinet

The Luzzatti government of Italy held office from 31 March 1910 until 29 March 1911, a total of 363 days, or 11 months and 28 days.

== Government parties ==
The government was composed by the following parties:

Party	Ideology	Leader
Historical Left	Liberalism	Giovanni Giolitti
Historical Right	Conservatism	Sidney Sonnino
Italian Radical Party	Radicalism	Ettore Sacchi

== Composition ==
Office	Name	Party	Term
Prime Minister	Luigi Luzzatti	Historical Right	(1910–1911)
Minister of the Interior	Luigi Luzzatti	Historical Right	(1910–1911)
Minister of Foreign Affairs	Antonio Paternò Castello	Historical Right	(1910–1911)
Minister of Grace and Justice	Cesare Fani	Historical Right	(1910–1911)
Minister of Finance	Luigi Facta	Historical Right	(1910–1911)
Minister of Treasury	Francesco Tedesco	Historical Left	(1910–1911)
Minister of War	Paolo Spingardi	Military	(1910–1911)
Minister of the Navy	Pasquale Leonardi Cattolica	Military	(1910–1911)
Minister of Agriculture, Industry and Commerce	Giovanni Raineri	Historical Right	(1910–1911)
Minister of Public Works	Ettore Sacchi	Italian Radical Party	(1910–1911)
Minister of Public Education	Luigi Credaro	Italian Radical Party	(1910–1911)
Minister of Post and Telegraphs	Antonio Ciuffelli	Historical Left	(1910–1911)
