= Giuseppe Ettore Viganò =

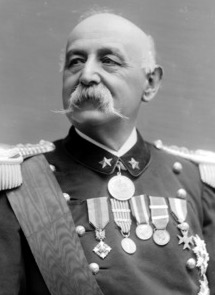

Senator
- In office 5 June 1906 – 8 August 1933

Minister of War
- In office 29 May 1906 – 29 December 1907
- Preceded by: Luigi Majnoni d'Intignano
- Succeeded by: Severino Casana

Deputy Governor of Eritrea
- In office 1897–1898

Giuseppe Ettore Viganò (Tradate, 27 April 1843- Florence 8 August 8 1933) was an officer in the Royal Army and politician in the Kingdom of Italy, member of the Senate from 1906 and minister of war from 1906 to 1907.

== Early military career ==
Giuseppe Ettore was the son of Francesco Viganò and his Rachele Pancera. He joined Giuseppe Garibaldi in 1860 and then began officer training at the Military Academy of Modena, which he completed on September 26, 1861. In the following years he found various positions in the Royal Italian Army as an officer in the artillery and infantry and took part in the Third Italian War of Independence. In 1871 he graduated from the it:Scuola di guerra dell'esercito.

He took part in the Italo-Ethiopian War of 1887–1889 which led to the annexation of Eritrea. Between November 6, 1887 and May 23, 1888 he was Chief of Staff of the High Command in Africa and was promoted to Colonel on April 8, 1888.

== Later military career ==
On April 2, 1891, Viganò became deputy director of the Istituto Geografico Militare and held this office until December 24, 1893. At the same time, between May 14, 1891 and May 27, 1894, he served as the War Ministry's representative to the Supreme Council for Geodetic Works (Consiglio superiore dei lavori geodetici). He then held the post of deputy commander of the non-commissioned officer school (it: Scuola sottufficiali dell'Esercito Italiano) between December 24, 1893 and October 2, 1895. On December 22, 1895, he was promoted to major general, after which he took part in the First Italo-Ethiopian War and became vice-governor of Eritrea on August 28, 1896 and acting governor between April 18 and November 30, 1897, during the absence of Antonio Baldissera. In that capacity he had to manage the attack of approximately 10,000 Sudanese Mahdists under the command of Ahmed Fadil, Emir of Gedaref. In January 1897, he marshalled a large force on Agordat, the Dervishes’ objective, convincing the emir to give up and retreat towards Sudan.

After returning to Italy, Viganò was appointed director of the Istituto Geografico Militare Military from December 9, 1897 to January 26, 1902 and at the same time served as a member of the it:Commissione geodetica italiana between April 23, 1898 and February 1902. He was promoted to lieutenant general on January 20, 1901.

== Political career ==
On May 29 1906 Viganò took over the office of Minister of War in the third Giolitti government and held this position until December 29, 1907. On June 5, 1906, he was appointed a member of the Senate.

During the period in which he served as minister (29 May 1906 - 29 December 1907), the armed forces were experiencing tension and discontent particularly among the non-commissioned officers (who according to a law of 1902 should have been discharged if they were without employment or in the twelfth year of service). Discontent centred on the magazine Il Pensiero militari and its director, former captain Fabio Ranzi. Viganò responded to the invectives in Ranzi’s magazine by publishing articles and giving interviews attacking him. The issue was eventually resolved with the establishment of a parliamentary commission of inquiry in June 1907 and a series of subsequent legislative measures which allocated a funds for the benefit of non-commissioned officers.

Viganò's brief period of office was also marked by a new law on recruitment of 15 December 1907 n. 763. This reduced the number of exemptions allowed and thereby expanded the number of men called up. Thanks to this reform more urban and middle class men went into the army. As well as expanding the size of the levy Viganò proposed to reduce the period of military service by two years. This proposal was not however enacted until 1909 by his successor Paolo Spingardi.

Viganò also had to resist pressure from the army general staff, which asked for large sums of money to complete the fortification of the borders against possible French or Austrian aggression; sums judged by Viganò to be "childishly pretentious". Consequently, he resolved to reduce the demands of the general staff from 332 to 200 million lire.

After the end of the First World War, on July 19, 1920, he became a member of the Parliamentary Commission of Inquiry into War Expenditures (Commissione parlamentare d'inchiesta sulle spese di guerra). His first marriage was to Carlotta Annunziata Operti and his second marriage was to Ernestina Dal Co.

== Honours ==
Grand Cross of the Order of Saints Maurice and Lazarus - ribbon for ordinary uniform

Grand Cross of the Order of Saints Maurice and Lazarus

Officer of the Military Order of Savoy - ribbon for ordinary uniform

Officer of the Military Order of Savoy

Grand Cross of the Order of the Crown of Italy - ribbon for ordinary uniform

Grand Cross of the Order of the Crown of Italy
