= Cesare Fani =

Italian politician

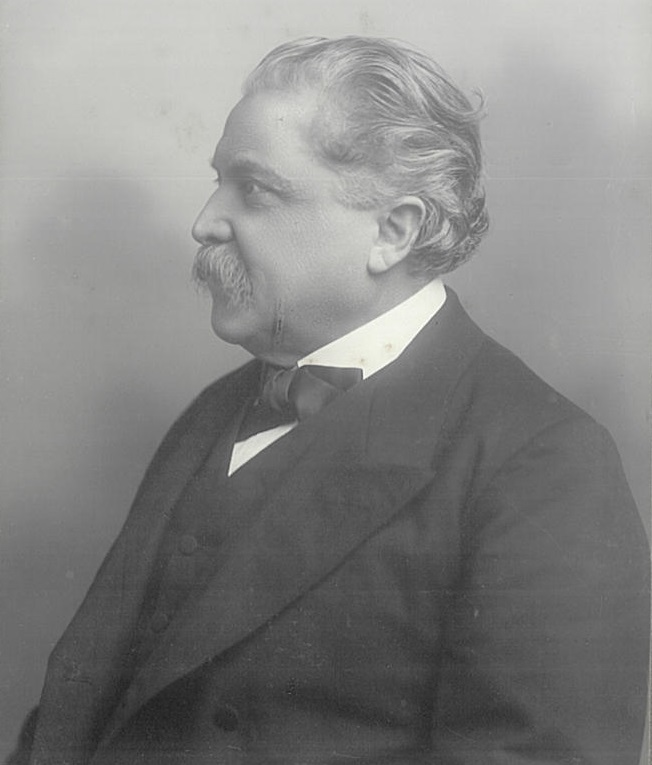

Member of the Chamber of Deputies
- In office 10 June 1886 – 5 February 1914

Undersecretary of Justice
- In office 2 October 1897 – 14 December 1897
- Preceded by: Scipione Ronchetti

Undersecretary of Justice
- In office 14 December 1897 – 1 June 1898

Undersecretary of Justice
- In office 1 June 1898 – 29 June 1898
- Succeeded by: Massimo Bonardi

Minister of Justice
- In office 31 March 1910 – 29 March 1911
- Preceded by: Vittorio Scialoja
- Succeeded by: Camillo Finocchiaro Aprile

Vice President of the Chamber of Deputies
- In office 12 February 1912 – 29 September 1913

Cesare Fani (Perugia, 5 February 1844 – Palermo, 5 February 1914) was an Italian politician, three times Undersecretary of the Ministry of Justice and then Minister (1910 -1911) in the Luzzatti government, as well as Vice President of the Chamber of Deputies.

== Early life and legal career ==
At the age of fifteen he took part in the 1859 Perugia uprising. As soon as he graduated with honors in 1866, he ran away from home to volunteer with Garibaldi in the Trentino expedition and volunteered to fight again in 1867 at the Battle of Mentana, earning promotions in the field.

After having practiced law in Naples at the office of the famous criminal lawyer, Enrico Pessina, he returned to Perugia where he opened a law firm and practiced law (closing the firm when he was in the national government), quickly earning fame throughout Italy.

He held numerous local positions, including substitute professor of Criminal Law and Procedure at the University of Perugia, president of the Accademia Literaria della Minerva, president of the Accademia dei Filedoni, president of the Sant'Anna Female Educator, and ordinary member of the Homeland History Institute for Umbria. He was several times elected councilor of the Municipality as well as provincial councilor of Umbria, and served as president of the Monarchist Liberal Party of Perugia, president first of the Disciplinary Council of Prosecutors and then of the Bar Association of Perugia.

== Political career ==
A proponent of liberal ideas, he was returned to the Chamber of Deputies by the electors of the second constituency of Perugia for 28 consecutive years from 1886 until his death, joining the ranks of the historical Right in the Chamber. He campaigned for the establishment of the Agricultural Institute (which later became the Faculty of Agriculture of the University of Perugia), the polyclinic and the electric tram (together with the then Prefect of Perugia Tommaso Tittoni). He was also responsible for the establishment of the National Association for the Sanitary Assistance of Italian Orphans (ONAOSI), the Umbrian Central Railway and, together with his colleague it:Guido Pompilj, the reclamation work of Lake Trasimeno. He is also remembered for his parliamentary interventions and studies on the secular state, religious teaching in primary schools, cooperativism, social security, protection of orphans, and the fight against alcoholism.

In the Chamber of Deputies he was several times a member and then vice-president of the Elections Committee and rapporteur on the budget of the Ministry of Justice. In the third, fourth and fifth Rudinì governments he was undersecretary of Justice with the ministers Emanuele Gianturco, Giuseppe Zanardelli and Teodorico Bonacci. He was also secretary of the "Commission of Seven" (1893) which investigated the Banca Romana scandal in 1893 and for which he had to interrogate Francesco Crispi.

With the Luzzatti Government he became Minister of Justice and subsequently vice-president of the Chamber of Deputies (1912-1913). As Minister, he completed the bills for the arrangement of the Central Judicial Records Office and the Offices of Judicial and Notarial Statistics, for the organization of the career of ushers at the Judicial Offices, for judicial officers, for the administration and conservation of the Palace of Justice, Rome, and for the reorganization of the Chancellery and Judicial Secretariats. He also prepared a new Code of Criminal Procedure; however, the Luzzati postponed bringing it to the floor of the Chamber so it was not finally presented until Fani’s successor Camillo Finocchiaro Aprile took it forward.

== Death and legacy ==
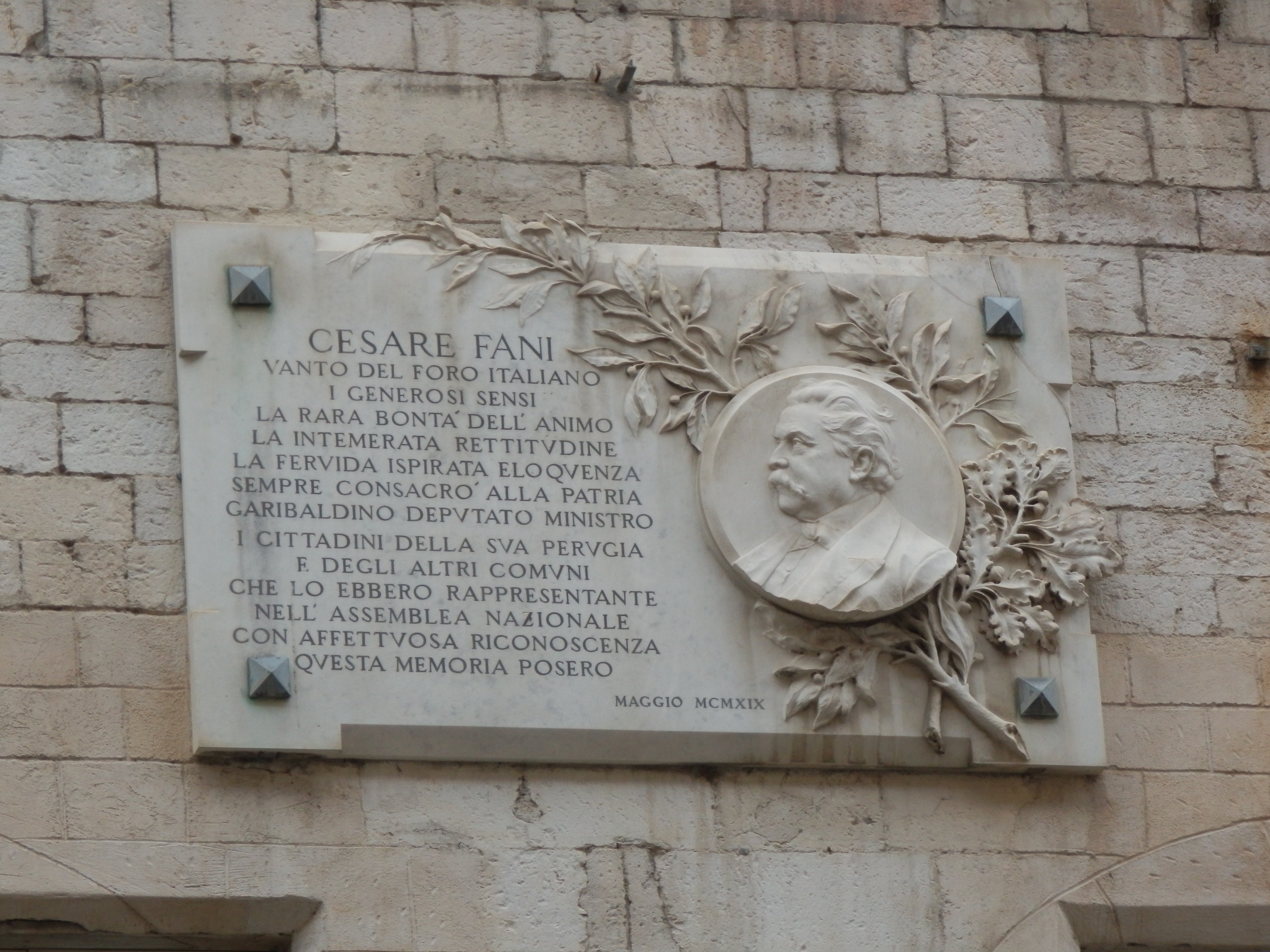
Cesare Fani plaque in Perugia

Fani died suddenly on 5 February 1914 in Palermo, where he had just argued a case before the Sicilian Court of Cassation. Funeral chambers were set up in Palermo, Rome and Perugia, where a crowd of 40,000 people welcomed the return of the body and took part in the city's mourning; a film was also shot of the occasion, and is today the oldest film in the history of Perugia.

Streets are dedicated to him in the historic center of Perugia (with a marble plaque on the family palace in the parallel Via Mazzini), in Rome and in Bastia Umbra.

== Family ==
Cesare Augusto Fani was the son of Angelo Fani (1808-1871), director of the Sacro Monte di Pietà of Perugia, and his wife Eugenia Angelini (1810-1890). His first marriage in 1872 was to Annetta Rotondi (1851-1881), with whom he had two sons - Camillo Fani (died in infancy) and Angelo Fani (1873-1943), lawyer, freelance lecturer in constitutional law, councilor of Perugia, and president of the Tripoli Bar Association.

He married again in 1887 to Iginia Rossi (1856-1895), daughter of the Florentine industrialist Cesare Rossi (1813-1870) and Eraclea Foschi (1826-1909). By her he had a daughter Annetta Fani (1888-1921) who married the engineer Paolo Bensa (1875-1963) from Genoa; and a son, it:Amedeo Fani (1891-1974), also a lawyer, deputy (1925-43), undersecretary of Foreign Affairs (1929-32), commissioner of the Chamber of Deputies (1934-43) and president of the Bar Association of Perugia.

== Honours ==
Knight Grand Cross of the Order of Saints Maurice and Lazarus - ribbon for ordinary uniform

Knight Grand Cross of the Order of Saints Maurice and Lazarus
— 3 June 1910

Commendatore dell'Ordine della Corona d'Italia - ribbon for ordinary uniform

Commander of the Order of the Crown of Italy
— 14 February 1898
