= Ettore Pedotti =

Italian general and politician

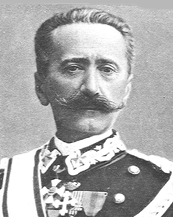

Minister of War
- In office 3 September 1903 – 12 March 1905
- Prime Minister: Giovanni Giolitti
- Preceded by: Giuseppe Ottolenghi
- In office 12 March 1905 – 27 March 1905
- Prime Minister: Tommaso Tittoni
- In office 27 March 1905 – 24 December 1905
- Prime Minister: Alessandro Fortis
- Succeeded by: Luigi Majnoni d'Intignano

Senator
- In office 8 November 1903 – 6 January 1919

Ettore Pedotti (Laveno, March 8, 1842 – Rome, January 6, 1919) was an Italian general and politician. He served as a Senator of the Kingdom and as Minister of War of the Kingdom of Italy in the successive Giolitti II, Tittoni, and Fortis I governments.

== Early military career ==
Pedotti was born in Laveno di Como in 1842 and in March 1859, while still a teenager, he left school to answer Giuseppe Garibaldi's call for national struggle against Austrian domination, eager to enlist as a volunteer in the first regiment of the corps of Cacciatori delle Alpi, commanded by Enrico Cosenz. Here he was quickly promoted to corporal and a few days later to sergeant. In this rank, on June 16, he distinguished himself in resisting superior enemy forces at the battle of Treponti that he was decorated with the medal of the military valour.

Following the Peace of Villafranca the volunteer corps was disbanded, but when Pedotti heard of the insurrection in Sicily and the expedition of the Thousand, he hurried to enlist in the I Battalion of the Bersaglieri Lombardi, once again under the command of Cosenz, and into the battle of Milazzo, he so distinguished himself that he was promoted to lieutenant in the field. At the battle of Volturno, Pedotti showed such wit and valour that, although he was only eighteen years old, he was promoted by Garibaldi to captain in the field and decorated with the Knight's Cross of the Military Order of Savoy.

== War School ==
Pedotti took advantage of the peace to study history, sciences and military arts, becoming one of Italy's most cultured, learned and most learned officers. In 1873 Pedotti was transferred from the infantry corps to the General Staff and, after the establishment of the war school, he was assigned to teach a course there. He was subsequently made commandant of the school. Then appointed to the command of a division, then to the second command of the general staff corps, he finally reached in 1900 the supreme rank of commander of an army corps as Lieutenant general.

== Political career ==
Appointed Minister of War and Senator in November 1903, he did not take long to acquire uncontested authority in the Assembly, demonstrated by the role that he took part in numerous discussions of general interest, particularly military ones, and the important commissions of which he was appointed member by the Senate.

Barely recovered from a long and serious illness which had struck him in Genoa, and still suffering from the recent fracture of an arm, he decided to return to Rome to chair the senate finance committee, convened to examine the bill to extend the provisional financial year, and take on its report. Just twenty days after this law was approved, he died of a heart attack on January 6, 1919.

== Honours ==
- Grand Cordon of the Order of Saints Maurice and Lazarus

- Grand Cordon of the Order of the Crown of Italy

- Knight of the Military Order of Savoy

- Obilić Medal (Montenegro)

Honorary Grand Cross of the Royal Victorian Order
