= Giovanni Bettolo =

Italian admiral, politician and deputy of the Kingdom of Italy

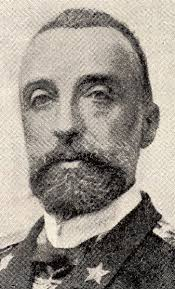

Minister of the Navy
- In office 14 May 1899 – 24 June 1900
- Preceded by: Giuseppe Palumbo
- Succeeded by: Enrico Morin
- In office 22 April 1903 – 21 June 1903
- Preceded by: Enrico Morin
- Succeeded by: Enrico Morin (interim)
- In office 11 December 1909 – 31 March 1910
- Preceded by: Carlo Mirabello
- Succeeded by: Pasquale Leonardi Cattolica

Member of the Chamber of Deputies
- In office 10 December 1890 – 7 April 1916

Giovanni Bettolo (Genoa, 25 May 1846 – Rome, 7 April 1916) was an Italian admiral, politician and deputy of the Kingdom of Italy who served three times as Minister of the Navy. He was President of the it:Lega Navale Italiana 1912-1916, as well as president of the Italian Scouts and Guides Association 1913-1915.

== Early life and career ==
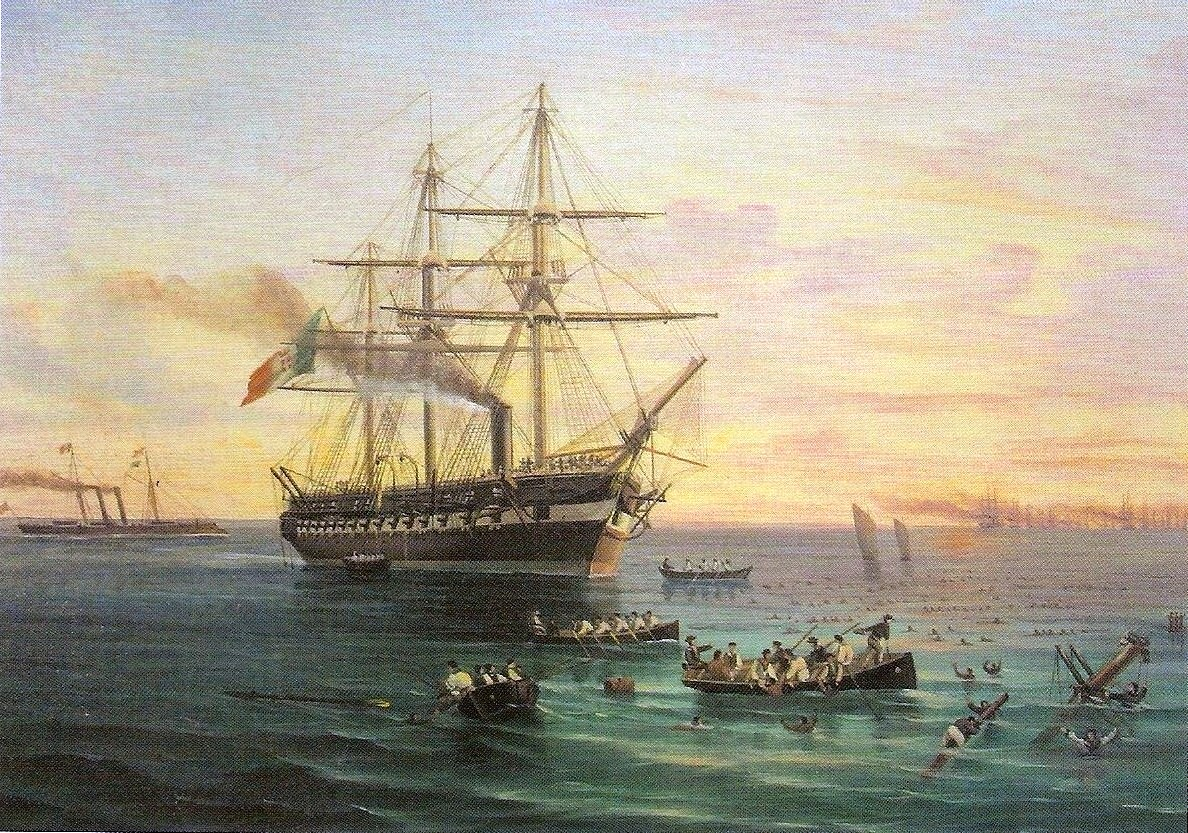
the Principe Umberto at Lissa

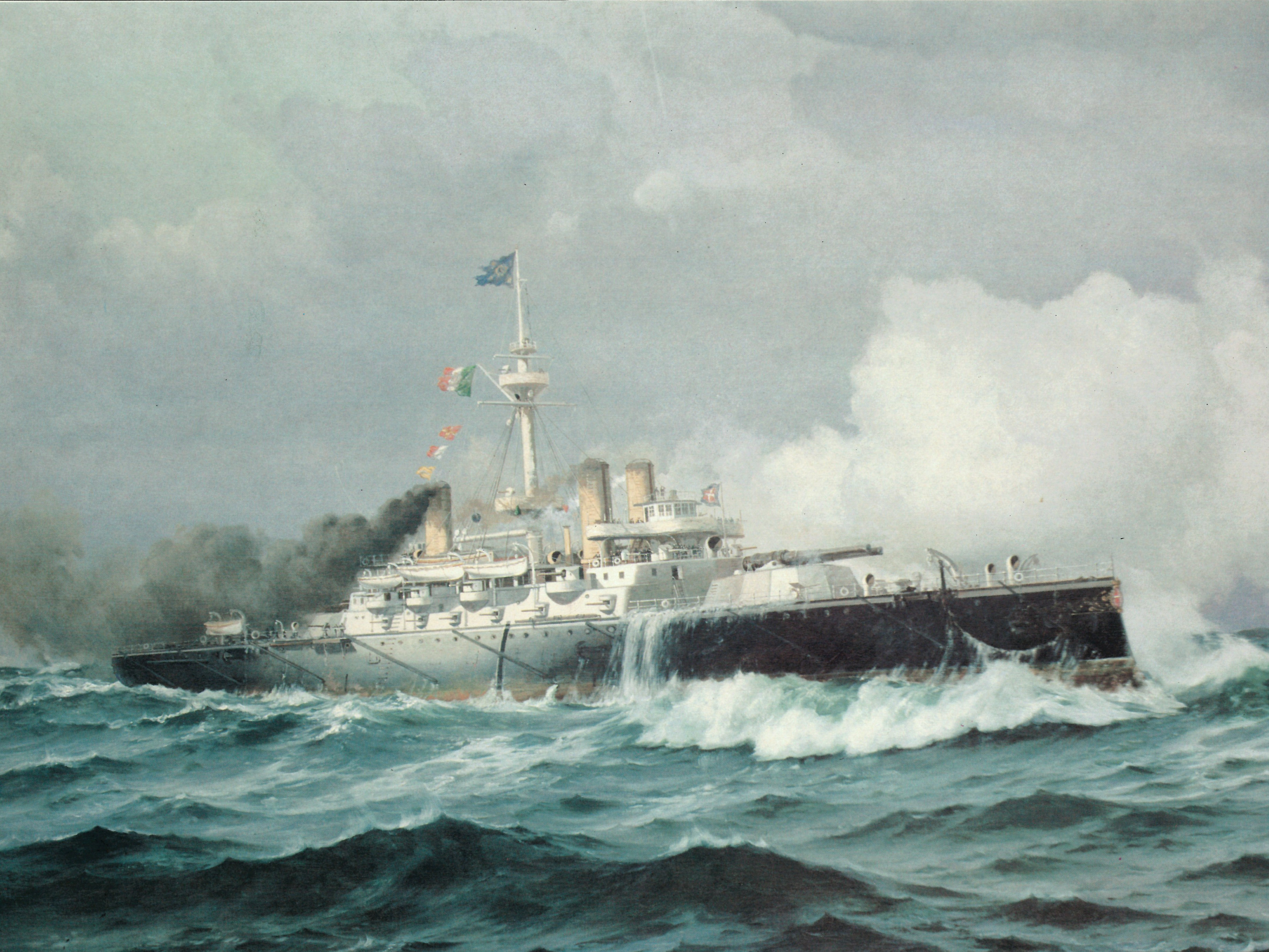
the Re Umberto

Giovanni Bettolo was born in Genoa to Antonio Bettolo and Angela Molinari, from a family with patriotic traditions, originally from Valsugana. He was the oldest of three brothers one of whom became an army general while the other ruined himself gambling. Giovanni entered the Regia Marina as an ensign in 1863 and was decorated for valour at the battle of Lissa for his conduct on the frigate Principe Umberto.

He became an admiral, working to rebuild the Italian fleet after the disastrous defeat at Lissa. Specialising in naval gunnery, he promoted the use of large calibre guns for naval artillery and the strategic use of torpedo boats. In 1879, with the rank of lieutenant, he was sent to Essen to study the advanced techniques of German industry. He published Manuale teorico pratico d'artiglieria navale (Theoretical and Practical Manual of Naval Artillery).

He came to the attention of Navy Minister Benedetto Brin, an energetic moderniser, who involved him in solving a range of technical issues faced by the Italian navy, from methods of testing the strength of armour plating to the development of a device to calculate target distance between two moving ships in order to make gunfire more accurate. Known as the “Indicatore dei fuochi Bettolo” (“Bettolo fire indicator”). This device, developed in 1877, was displayed at the 1884 Turin exhibition. He improved on his first invention and in 1883 produced an updated mechanism known as the “indicatore di lancio Bettolo” (“Bettolo launch indicator”).

In 1895, commanding the ironclad Re Umberto, Bettolo joined a number of Italian ships at the ceremony for the opening of the Kiel Canal. In 1897 he was promoted to rear admiral and also served as deputy inspector of naval engineering. During the international intervention in Crete Bettolo took over from Felice Napoleone Canevaro in 1898 as the admiral in charge of the Italian naval forces operating near the island. During the same year he was appointed Navy Chief of Staff.

== Ministerial career ==
He elected to the Chamber of Deputies for the constituency of Genoa from 1890 to 1900 and then for Recco from 1900-1916. He also served three times as Minister of the Navy in the second Pelloux, Zanardelli and second Sonnino governments.

During his first term as minister, Bettolo had the naval engineer Vittorio Cuniberti develop plans for Italy’s Regina Elena-class battleships. As a member of the Triple Alliance Italy was expecting to confront the French navy in the Mediterranean, with British support. Numerical superiority in warships was impossible against such enemies, so the aim was to build ships faster than enemy battleships but better armoured than enemy cruisers. This was a building programme Bettolo had advocated as admiral before he became minister.

As soon as Bettolo returned to the Ministry of the Navy for his second term in April 1903, the editor of the socialist newspaper Avanti!, Enrico Ferri, started a ferocious campaign against him, claiming that he had increased the salary of the President of the Superior Council of the Navy in order to induce him to approve a contract for the supply of naval armour in the amount of 20 million lire with the Terni steelworks, branding him a corrupt profiteer. He also noted that every time Bettolo was appointed to a senior role, Terni shares rose in value. Bettolo denied these claims in parliament and the chamber voted not to set up a commission of enquiry, but Giolitti then resigned from the cabinet and Bettolo followed him a few days later. He then brought a successful case for defamation against Ferri.

Bettolo’s brief third term was dominated by the question of “convenzioni marittime”, that is, the arrangements between the state and various private firms that built merchant ships or operated shipping lines. This was a controversial topic: the previous Giolitti government had managed to secure the passage of a similar set of measures through parliament in 1908, but the controversy about state subsidies for private firms was so intense that in 1909 Giolitti’s cabinet was forced to resign.

Bettolo’s bill proposed to limit subsidies and reduce various fees that shipping firms could charge. It was attacked on many grounds, including that it put Italian merchant shipping into the hands of the predominantly German-owned Banca Commerciale Italiana and that it increased the liabilities of the state without strengthening the merchant navy;. Above all, Bettolo’s bill was accused of being an effort to “salvage old hulks” (“salvataggio delle vecchie carcasse”) - i.e. unviable and moribund navigation companies. The disputes about the bill eventually led to the resignation of the Sonnino government.

== Later career ==
Though he never returned to ministerial office after 1910, Bettolo remained an active member of the Chamber of Deputies. In 1913 he argued in the chamber that the navy did not need to have technically detailed and fixed specifications laid down in law as it needed to move forward as naval science evolved, and that it was better to have a series of short term shipbuilding plans that could be delivered quickly according to the changing financial circumstances of the country. He also clashed in the chamber with his successor as Navy Minister, Pasquale Leonardi Cattolica, over the delays and inefficiencies of the battleship building programme.

Meanwhile his naval career continued. From 1900-1903 he served as commander of the Naval Academy. Appointed vice admiral in December 1905, in 1906 he assumed command of the Maritime Department of Venice. In 1907 he once again held the position of Chief of Staff of the Navy. In 1908 he established the Navy War School (renamed the Maritime War Institute in 1921) for the training of senior officers, and in the same year he visited Brindisi, which the navy was starting to develop into a major base. In 1911 he retired from active service and was raised to the nobility as a count for the services he had rendered to the country.

After his retirement he continued to take an active role in public life. In 1912 he was elected President of the Lega Navale Italiana, a role he retained until his death. He became head of the Italian Scouts and Guides Association in 1913, at a time when there was a question as to whether the association should remain strictly secular, or find some accommodation with the nascent Catholic scouting movement. Bettolo negotiated an agreement with the leaders of the Catholic movement, but the Association disavowed it and Bettolo had to resign in September 1915. The Catholics then formed their own movement, the Associazione Scouts Cattolici Italiani.
