= Luigi Majnoni d'Intignano =

Italian prince, general and senator

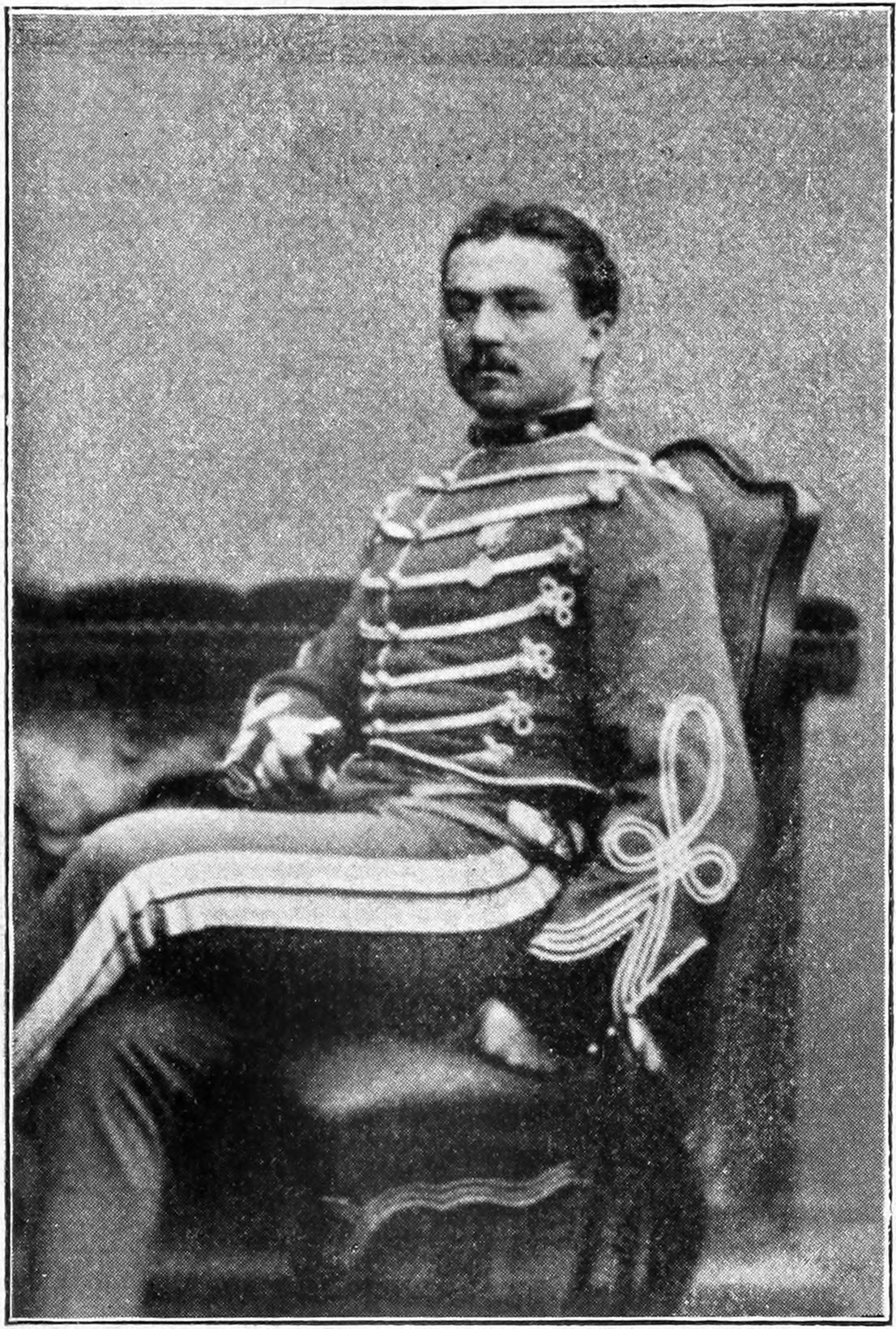

Minister of War
- In office 24 December 1905 – 8 February 1906
- Preceded by: Ettore Pedotti
- In office 8 February 1906 – 29 May 1906
- Succeeded by: Giuseppe Ettore Viganò

Senator
- In office 2 February 1906 – 11 August 1918

Luigi Majnoni d'Intignano (Milan, February 24, 1841 - Castelnuovo di Parravicino, Erba, August 11, 1918) was an Italian prince, general and senator of the Kingdom of Italy.

== Early life ==
Luigi was the great-grandson of Napoleon's general it: Giuseppe Antonio Maria Michele Mainoni and the son of colonel Gerolamo Majnoni, one of three who chose military careers. Raised in Milan, then part of the Austrian Empire, Luigi, with his older brother Stefano and their father Gerolamo, left the city on 14 February 1859 to escape the police and took refuge in Piedmont.

When they arrived in Vigevano, both young men volunteered to serve in the cavalry regiment "Cavalleggeri di Monferrato", stationed in the town. This was the start of Luigi Majnoni’s military career in which he quickly distinguished himself, being wounded in the right hand by a sabre cut on June 22, between it:Rivoltella del Garda and Pozzolengo, while he was "the last of the rearguard that suffered the shock of the head of the column of an enemy squadron". His conduct in this action saw him promoted to sub-lieutenant.

While continuing to serve in his regiment, Majnoni was named honorary aide-de-camp to King Victor Emmanuel II on February 18, 1860. He was promoted to lieutenant on June 3, 1860, then captain on May 8, 1864 when he joined the "Lancieri di Foggia" regiment. With this regiment, he took part in the Third Italian War of Independence and became first adjutant in 1868.

On December 31, 1871, he was admitted to the staff course at the Turin War School, which he completed in August 1873, ranking second out of thirty candidates. Assigned to the 18th Cavalry Regiment, he was immediately sent on a mission to Germany to participate in major cavalry manoeuvres. He returned to Italy in October 1873 and was promoted to major in the 19th Cavalry Regiment. He entered the General Staff and was appointed, on November 1 1874, military attaché at the Vienna Embassy, where he remained until December 31 1877, with the exception of a brief period in November 1876 when he was part of the international commission responsible for establishing the Turkish-Serbian armistice.

== Nobility, military promotions and political interlude ==
Back in Italy, Majnoni – who had been recognized as noble by the Consulta Araldica in January 1876 – was appointed chief of staff of the military division of Milan and, on March 27, 1879, promoted to lieutenant colonel. The same year, on September 21, he married Margherita Greppi di Corneliano e Bussero, with whom he had a son, Girolamo, the following year. On May 10, 1883, having become colonel, he was appointed commander of the 32nd infantry regiment stationed in Savona, a position he held for a year before going to Bologna to command the "Novara" cavalry regiment.

From August 31, 1886, he returned to the General Staff in Rome until March 1890, when he became brigadier colonel and was given command of the VII Cavalry Brigade. He retained this command even after his appointment as major general on April 19, 1891, until December 1896, when he was promoted to lieutenant general and appointed commander of the Territorial Military Division of Padua. The following year, on 1 October, he was appointed inspector of cavalry, a position he held until February 1902, when he was appointed commander of the IV Army Corps, but he was immediately transferred to command the VI Corps in Naples. From the VI Corps he moved to the I Corps in Turin in November 1904, where he remained for a year.

Majnoni stood unsuccessfully for election to the Chamber of Deputies in 1880 and 1894. He was nevertheless appointed, unelected, to the cabinet as Minister of War in the second Fortis government on 24 December 1905. On the same day he was also appointed senator.

The Fortis cabinet was very short-lived. It was replaced by the Sonnino cabinet, in which Majnoni retained the War Ministry, but in May this government also resigned. His brief tenure did not allow him to take any significant action. It is probable that the reorganization of the general staff, sanctioned by the decree of March 4, 1906, had been planned and prepared by previous ministers. Nevertheless the "New distribution of responsibilities by divisions, sections and offices of the Ministry of War" published on April 26 as a consequence of the reorganization of the General Staff, can certainly be attributed to Majnoni.

== Later life ==
At the end of his government experience, Majnoni was placed temporarily at the disposal of the Ministry of Inspections. However, on July 29, 1906, he was appointed commander of the III Army Corps in Milan, a position he held until February 24, 1909, when, having reached the age limit, he was placed in auxiliary service. The title of count was conferred on him by the king Victor Emmanuel III the day after the end of his time in the auxiliary service. On February 6, 1911, he was called for temporary service in command of the IIIrd Army Corps but finally retired on September 1, 1914.

Returning to private life, he engaged, as before, in the field of military welfare. In 1909, he was advisor to the association "Premio al Valore" (Prize of Courage), then he became president of the executive committee of the "Pro-Army", a relief committee for needy families of Lombard soldiers killed and wounded in war, which helped 12,000 families during the Italo-Turkish War.

He died in Castelnuovo di Parravicino, today a hamlet of Erba, on August 11, 1918.

== Honours ==
- Grand Cordon of the Order of Saints Maurice and Lazarus

- Grand Cordon de l'Order of the Crown of Italy

- Commander of the de Order of Christ (Portugal)

- Knight of the Order of Leopold (Austria)

- Knight of the Order of the Crown (Prussia)
