= Pietro Rosano =

Italian politician and lawyer

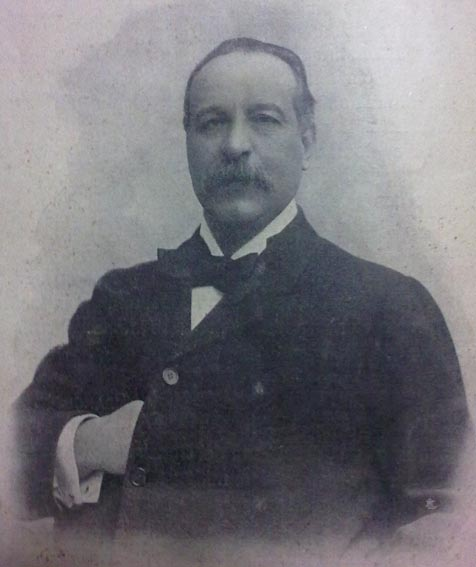

Italian Minister of Finance
- In office 3 November 1903 – 9 November 1903
- Prime Minister: Giovanni Giolitti
- Preceded by: Paolo Carcano
- Succeeded by: Luigi Luzzatti

Member of the Chamber of Deputies
- Constituency: Aversa

Personal details
- Born: 25 December 1846 Naples, Italy
- Died: 9 November 1903 (aged 56) Naples, Italy
- Party: Historical Left
- Spouse: Francesca Grandinetti
- Parents: Marianna Vinci (father); Giuseppe Rosano (mother)
- Relatives: Gaspare Colosimo (wife's brother-in-law)
- Education: Law degree
- Profession: Lawyer

Pietro Rosano (Naples, 25 December 1846 – Naples, 9 November 1903) was an Italian politician and lawyer.

== Biography ==
A supporter of Giovanni Giolitti, the statesman of Mondovì, Rosano was a member of Parliament representing the constituency of Aversa almost continuously from October 1882 to 1903, undersecretary at the Ministry of the Interior (1892–93) and Minister of Finance of the Kingdom of Italy in the Giolitti II Cabinet.

He was a prominent criminal lawyer whose penetrating legal and oratorical style contributed to his success in courts across Italy, including in particularly challenging trials. Husband to the sister-in-law of the lawyer and philanthropist Gaspare Colosimo, he was a pupil of Nicola Amore, the lawyer and mayor of Naples.

Shortly after the second Giolitti government gained confidence in the Chamber of Deputies, members of the Italian Socialist Party, the Italian Republican Party and the Italian Radical Party launched a campaign of personal attacks against him. Rosano, unaccustomed to such bitter political clashes and experiencing serious family problems, proclaimed his innocence by shooting himself in the heart at his home in Naples, only six days after taking office as Minister of Finance.

The city of Aversa named a street after him and erected a marble monument in the Villa Comunale.

== Personal life ==
Some biographies erroneously state that Pietro Rosano was born in Aversa. He was born in Naples on 25 December 1846 in via Ventaglieri 12. He was born to Giuseppe Rosano, originally from Caivano, and Marianna Vinci.

Together with Giovanni Battista Cassinis, keeper of the seals from Piedmont, Rosano was the second minister who committed suicide in office since the foundation of the Kingdom of Italy.
