= Pasquale Leonardi Cattolica =

Italian admiral and politician

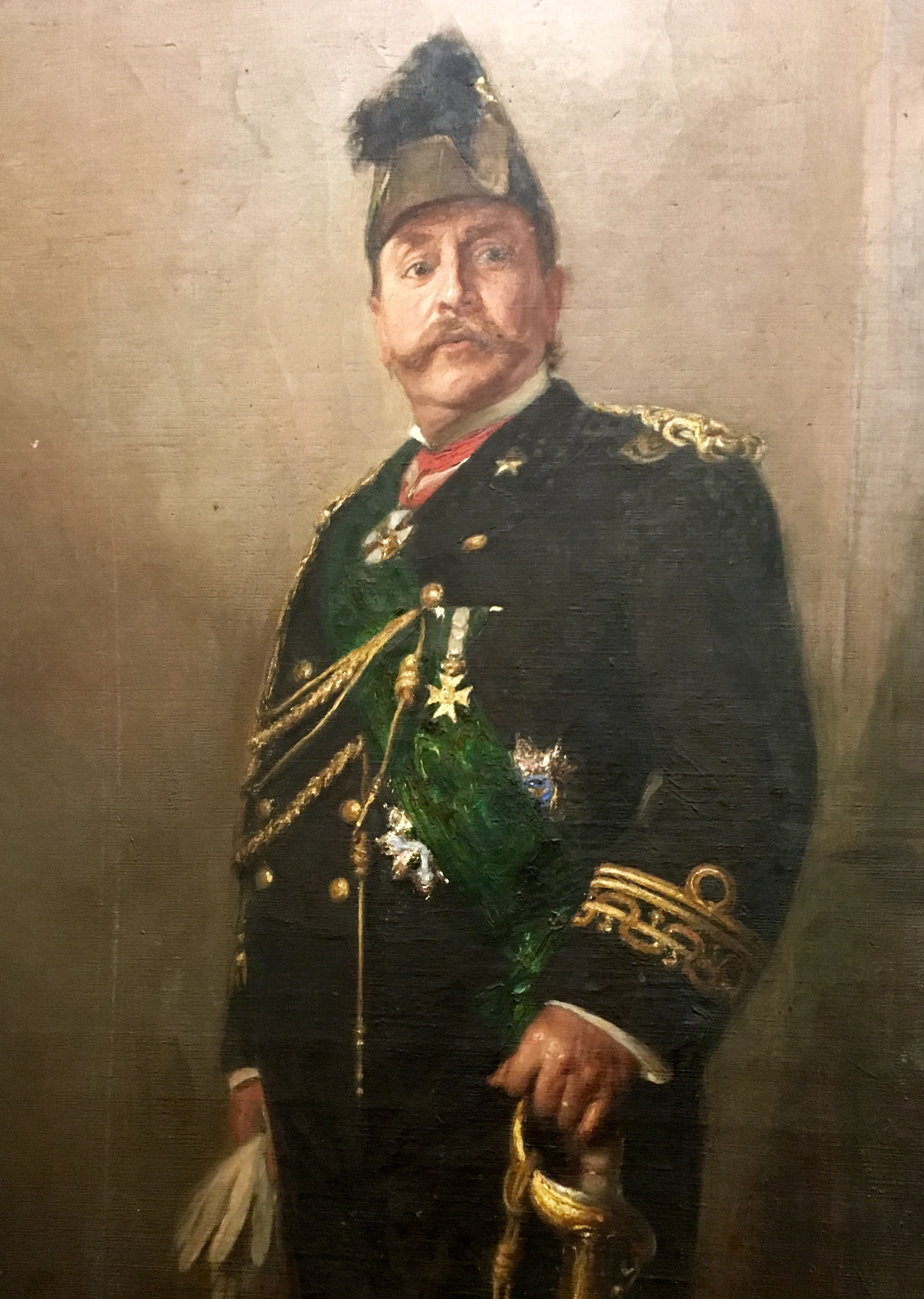

Senator
- In office 30 April 1910 – 26 March 1924

Minister of the Navy
- In office 31 March 1910 – 29 July 1913
- Preceded by: Giovanni Bettolo
- Succeeded by: Enrico Millo

Count Pasquale Leonardi Cattolica (Naples, 12 February 1854 – Rome, 26 March 1924) was an Italian admiral and politician. He was Minister of the Navy of the Kingdom of Italy during the Italo-Turkish War.

== Early life ==
Pasquale Leonardi Cattolica was the son of Edoardo Leonardi Cattolica and his wife Giulia Vacca. He enrolled in the Royal Naval School of Naples in 1868, graduating from the University of Naples in engineering with a specialisation in mathematics in 1872, with the rank of ensign. He was to marry Agata, daughter of his mathematics professor Emanuele Fergola.

== Scientific and naval career ==
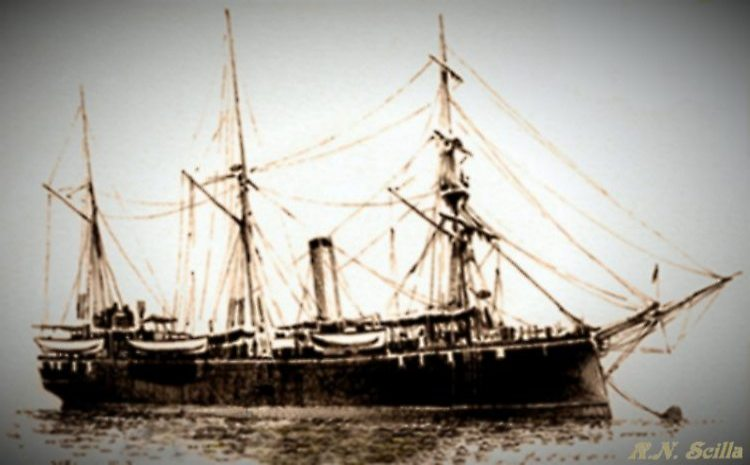
The gunboat Scilla.

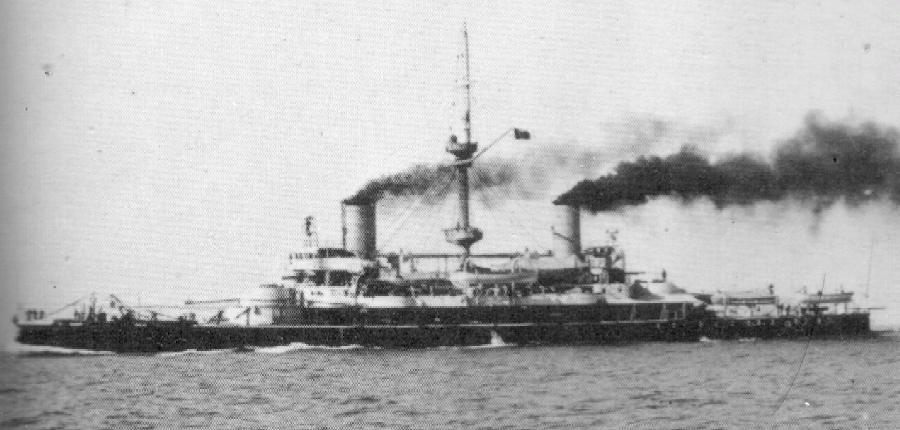
The battleship Ammiraglio di Saint Bon.

He dedicated himself to the nautical sciences and in particular to hydrography, navigation and nautical astronomy, being a frequent visitor to the Astronomical Observatory of Capodimonte. He was promoted to second lieutenant in 1876 and lieutenant in 1883, meanwhile becoming a freelance lecturer in astronomy at the University of Naples. He also taught at the Italian Naval Academy in Leghorn (Livorno).

In 1897 he was appointed director of the Hydrographic Office of Genoa. As such he directed numerous scientific expeditions on the gunboat Scilla. Scilla undertook hydrographic survey work along the Adriatic coast, as well as making a study of the ocean currents along the coast of Apulia. In 1899 the Hydrographic Office was upgraded and renamed the Hydrographic Institute of the Regia Marina. Under Cattolica's direction it took on the task of preparing nautical charts, books, and instruments for navigation, compiling and publishing hydrographic records. In 1900 he also began to publish the first Annali Idrografici for general use by both the navy and the merchant marine.

In addition to the publications of the institute, Cattolica published a number of technical and scientific works, and was awarded the teaching position in astronomy at the University of Genoa. His work was widely recognized and he became a corresponding member of the Accademia dei Lincei and of the Accademia Pontaniana.

As had a similarly impressive active service career, commanding the battleship Ammiraglio di Saint Bon for two years. He was promoted to rear admiral in 1907 and vice admiral in 1911. He served as a member of the Superior Council of the Navy and was appointed commander of a naval division in the Mediterranean, a position which he was unable to carry out because on 2 April 1910 he was appointed senator of the Kingdom of Italy.

== Political career ==
In 1910, in addition to his appointment as senator, Leonardi Cattolica became Minister of the Navy under the Luzzatti and fourth Giolitti governments.

An area of controversy during Leonardi Cattolica's term in office was Italy's struggling battleship building programme. Italy was engaged in a race for superiority at sea with France and Austria-Hungary, both of which were able to build ships faster. Italy's first dreadnought, Dante Alighieri, had been ordered before he joined the Council of Ministers, and while he was Navy Minister in 1910 the three battleships of the Conte di Cavour class also were ordered and laid down. In 1911 two additional Andrea Doria-class battleships also were ordered. The constant delays in finishing these vessels caused a heated argument in the Chamber of Deputies between Leonardi Cattolica and his predecessor Giovanni Bettolo over who was responsible. Leonardi Cattolica blamed the practice of subcontracting, while Bettolo blamed poor coordination between technical and administrative departments.

While Italy laboured to build a fleet that would outclass Austria-Hungary's, tensions between the two countries were high in 1911 following the outbreak of the Italo-Turkish War, and the Battle of Preveza in particular. Some Regia Marina commanders were keen on looking for a confrontation with Austria-Hungary, and to prevent hostilities from breaking out Leonardi Cattolica had to intervene personally and meet the Duke of the Abruzzi, fleet commander-in-chief, to direct him not to engage Ottoman ships without explicit orders.

His efforts were not confined to naval matters. To support Italy's merchant marine he introduced to the Chamber of Deputies in December 1910 a bill to establish a state-subsidised shipping line to serve the Italy–Canada route. This became law in December 1912. It not only provided for increased trade but transported emigrants to North America.

While he was minister Leonardi Cattolica attempted to reform many aspects of Italy's naval infrastructure, from shipbuilding and the management of arsenals to the recruitment and training of seamen. Inevitably his drives for reform made him enemies, particularly as he attempted to implement many without consultation. On 29 July 1913 Cattolica resigned from the Council of Ministers and was immediately replaced by Enrico Millo.

== Later career ==
After he left government he was appointed commander of the Maritime Department of Naples; from 1916 he was president of the Superior Council of the Navy until 1 February 1917, when he was moved into the reserve and awarded the title of country king Victor Emmanuel III.

A major challenge facing Italy after the First World War was the losses suffered by its merchant navy, with 57% of all vessels requisitioned during the war sunk by enemy action. There was an urgent need to train up anew generation of seamen, so the then Minister of the Navy Alberto del Bono decided to bring all the nautical schools in the country under the jurisdiction of his department. He asked Cattolica to head a commission to look into the state of nautical training.

Among the recommendations of Cattolica's commission were that the course of study at the Naval Academy should be reduced from five years to two; giving the academy the status of a Higher Technical Professional School, and that it should admit only students who had graduated from the nautical institutes.

Following this, Cattolica promoted the first higher institute of nautical studies in Italy, the Royal Naval Institute of Naples which was founded in 1920 and which he directed until his death in 1924. The Institute undertook both teaching and research. This institution evolved into today's Parthenope University of Naples.

In 1919 a magazine was launched, the Rassegna Marittima Aeronautica illustrata (Illustrated Maritime and Aeronautical Review), for an audience interested in the theoretical and technical details of ships and aircraft in military use. With Cattolica as its founder and director, the magazine appeared monthly from 2919 to 1921, when it merged with L’Aeronautica and continued under the title L’Aeronautica e la Marina until 1930.

== Works ==
- Trattato di navigazione: Libro di testo per la R. Accademia navale (Treatise on Navigation; Textbook for the Royal Naval Academy) Livorno 1893
- Determinazione della latitudine dell'osservatorio della R. Accademia navale di Livorno fatta nel 1897 secondo il metodo di Talcott (Determination of the latitude of the observatory of the R. Naval Academy of Livorno made in 1897 according to the Talcott method) Genoa 1897
- Determinazione della latitudine dell'osservatorio del R. Ufficio idrografico mediante passaggi di stelle al primo verticale eseguita nel 1898 (Determination of the latitude of the Royal Hydrographic Office observatory by means of the passage of stars at the first vertical performed in 1898) Genoa 1898
- Stazione astronomica a San Cataldo di Bari (Astronomical station in San Cataldo di Bari) Genoa 1899
- Operazioni astronomico-geodetiche eseguite negli anni 1901-02 a Portofino (monte del Telegrafo) nell'Isola Maddalena (semaforo Guardia Vecchia) ed a Livorno (Astronomical-geodetic operations carried out in the years 1901-02 in Portofino (Monte del Telegrafo) on Maddalena Island (Guardia Vecchia traffic light) and in Livorno), Genoa 1904
- Il porto di Napoli, (The Port of Naples) Naples 1918
- I concetti fondamentali della riforma dell'istruzione nautica e l'opera del ministero della Marina (Fundamental concepts of the reform of nautical education and the work of the Ministry of the Navy) Rome 1918
- Necessità di una riforma del sistema di reclutamento del personale della Marina militare (Need for a reform of the Navy personnel recruitment system), Rome 1919

== Honours ==
Knight of the Supreme Order of the Most Holy Annunciation - ribbon for ordinary uniform

Knight of the Supreme Order of the Most Holy Annunciation
— 1912

Grand Cordon of the Order of Saints Maurice and Lazarus - ribbon for ordinary uniform

Grand Cordon of the Order of Saints Maurice and Lazarus
— 1911

Grand Cordon of the Order of the Crown of Italy - ribbon for ordinary uniform

Grand Cordon of the Order of the Crown of Italy
— 1911
