= First Sonnino government =

44th Government of Kingdom of Italy

Sonnino I government
- 44th Cabinet of Italy

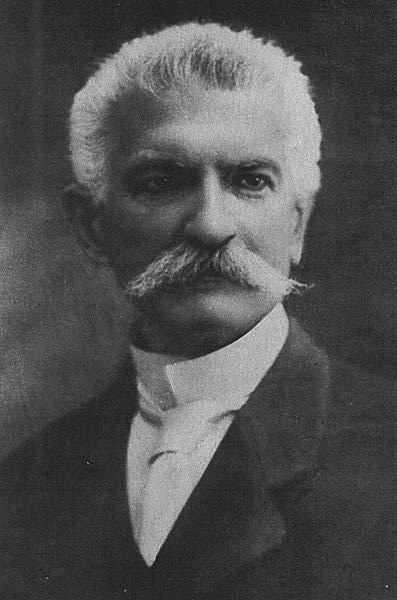
- Date formed: 8 February 1906
- Date dissolved: 29 May 1906

People and organisations
- Head of state: Victor Emmanuel III
- Head of government: Sidney Sonnino
- Total no. of members: 11
- Member party: Historical Left; Historical Right; Italian Radical Party

History
- Predecessor: Fortis II Cabinet
- Successor: Giolitti III Cabinet

The Sonnino I government of Italy held office from 8 February 1906 until 29 May 1906, a total of 110 days, or 3 months and 21 days.

== Government parties ==
The government was composed by the following parties:

Party	Ideology	Leader
Historical Left	Liberalism	Giovanni Giolitti
Historical Right	Conservatism	Sidney Sonnino
Italian Radical Party	Radicalism	Ettore Sacchi

== Composition ==
Office	Name	Party	Term
Prime Minister	Sidney Sonnino	Historical Right	(1906–1906)
Minister of the Interior	Sidney Sonnino	Historical Right	(1906–1906)
Minister of Foreign Affairs	Francesco Guicciardini	Historical Right	(1906–1906)
Minister of Grace and Justice	Ettore Sacchi	Italian Radical Party	(1906–1906)
Minister of Finance	Antonio Salandra	Historical Right	(1906–1906)
Minister of Treasury	Luigi Luzzatti	Historical Right	(1906–1906)
Minister of War	Luigi Majnoni d'Intignano	Military	(1906–1906)
Minister of the Navy	Carlo Mirabello	Military	(1906–1906)
Minister of Agriculture, Industry and Commerce	Edoardo Pantano	Historical Left	(1906–1906)
Minister of Public Works	Pietro Carmine	Historical Right	(1906–1906)
Minister of Public Education	Paolo Boselli	Historical Right	(1906–1906)
Minister of Post and Telegraphs	Alfredo Baccelli	Historical Right	(1906–1906)
