= Second Sonnino government =

46th Government of Kingdom of Italy

Sonnino II government
- 46th Cabinet of Italy

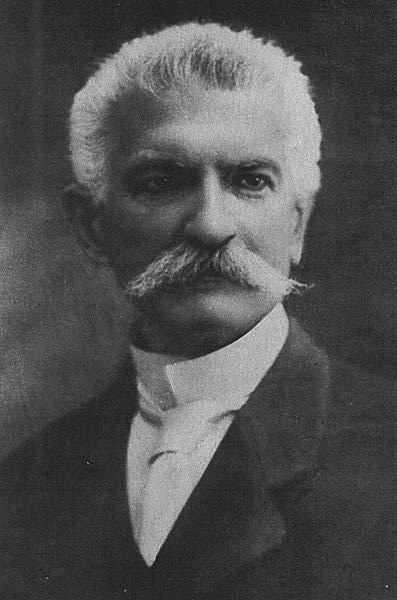
- Date formed: 11 December 1909
- Date dissolved: 31 March 1910

People and organisations
- Head of state: Victor Emmanuel III
- Head of government: Sidney Sonnino
- Total no. of members: 11
- Member party: Historical Right; Historical Left

History
- Predecessor: Giolitti III Cabinet
- Successor: Luzzatti Cabinet

The Sonnino II government of Italy held office from 11 December 1909 until 31 March 1910, a total of 110 days, or 3 months and 20 days.

== Government parties ==
The government was composed by the following parties:

Party	Ideology	Leader
Historical Left	Liberalism	Giovanni Giolitti
Historical Right	Conservatism	Sidney Sonnino

Ministers belonged to the Right, but the Left retained several undersecretaries.

== Composition ==
Office	Name	Party	Term
Prime Minister	Sidney Sonnino	Historical Right	(1909–1910)
Minister of the Interior	Sidney Sonnino	Historical Right	(1909–1910)
Minister of Foreign Affairs	Francesco Guicciardini	Historical Right	(1909–1910)
Minister of Grace and Justice	Vittorio Scialoja	Historical Right	(1909–1910)
Minister of Finance	Enrico Arlotta	Historical Right	(1909–1910)
Minister of Treasury	Antonio Salandra	Historical Right	(1909–1910)
Minister of War	Paolo Spingardi	Military	(1909–1910)
Minister of the Navy	Giovanni Bettolo	Military	(1909–1910)
Minister of Agriculture, Industry and Commerce	Luigi Luzzatti	Historical Right	(1909–1910)
Minister of Public Works	Giulio Rubini	Historical Right	(1909–1910)
Minister of Public Education	Edoardo Daneo	Historical Right	(1909–1910)
Minister of Post and Telegraphs	Ugo di Sant'Onofrio del Castillo	Historical Right	(1909–1910)
