= Scipione Ronchetti =

Italian politician

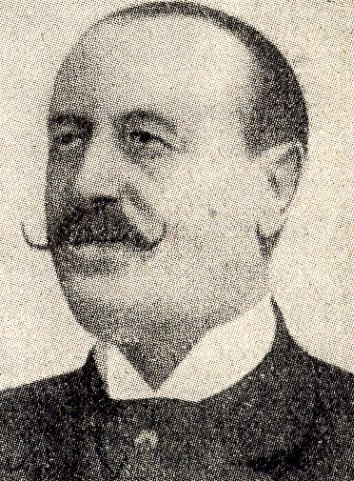

Member of the Chamber of Deputies
- In office 20 November 1876 – 27 April 1886
- In office 10 December 1890 – 1 December 1918

Minister of Justice
- In office 3 November 1903 – 27 March 1905
- Preceded by: Francesco Cocco-Ortu
- Succeeded by: Camillo Finocchiaro Aprile

Scipione Ronchetti (Porto Valtravaglia, 19 October 1846 – Milan, 1 December 1918) was an Italian politician.

== Biography ==
He graduated in Law at the University of Pavia where he lived at the Collegio Borromeo.

On 4 January 1877 he was initiated into Freemasonry in the Loggia La Ragione in Milan, and on 23 November 1878 he became a Master Mason.

He was elected first as a city councilor in Milan and later to the Chamber of Deputies for three legislatures, first for the constituency of Pizzighettone, then Cremona and later Milan, joining the ranks of the historical Left. In 1890 he was elected for the constituency of Gallarate and remained there until his death.

Initially Undersecretary for Justice, Education and the Interior, he was later Minister of Grace and Justice from 1903 to 1905, under the second Giolitti and Tittoni governments, giving his name to the two laws for conditional sentencing and for the ban on carrying knives.
