= Paolo Spingardi =

Italian General and politician

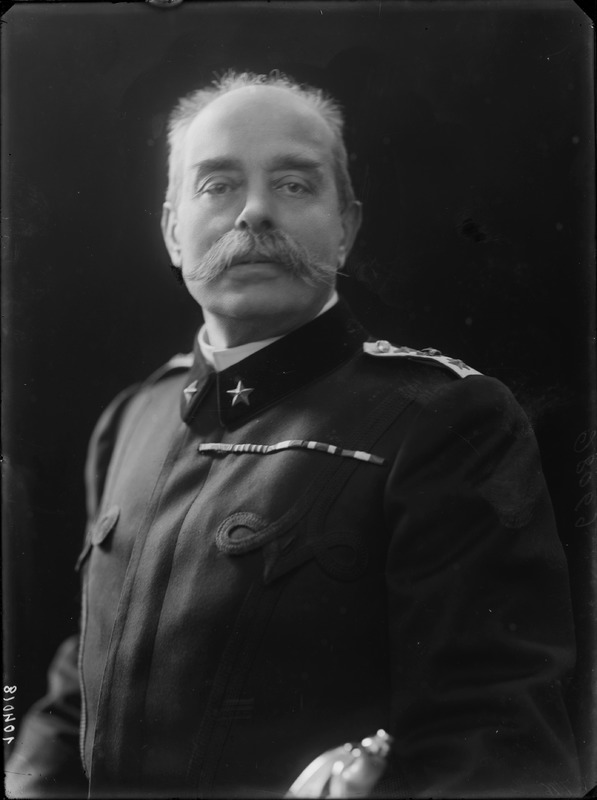
- Born: 2 November 1845; Felizzano, Italy
- Died: 22 September 1918 (aged 72); Spigno Monferrato, Italy
- Occupations: General, Minister of War

Count Paolo Antonio Spingardi (2 November 1845 - 22 September 1918) was an Italian General and politician, who served as Minister of War during the Italo-Turkish War and in the years ahead of World War I.

== Life and career ==
Born in Felizzano, after attending the Military College of Modena Spingardi took part to the Third Italian War of Independence as a second lieutenant of grenadiers. In 1874 he joined the Staff Officers Corps (SM), being appointed Commander of the Corps in 1876.

In 1897 Spingardi started working as head of the General Secretariat of the Minister of War, becoming Director General of Administrative Services in 1898. Deputy between 1904 and 1909 and Senator from 1909 till his death, he was undersecretary of the war ministry between 1903 and 1905, and after a short experience as Commanding General of the Carabinieri Corps in 1909 he became Minister of War, a role he held until 1914 under four different cabinets. During this time he supervised the Italo-Turkish War, was decorated with the Supreme Order of the Most Holy Annunciation and received the title of Count.

During the World War I, Spingardi served for less than a month as territorial commander of the III army corps, in Milan, being exonerated after his measures against pacifist and interventionist demonstrations were deemed too weak by the government. He was later nominated president of the central commission for the war prisoners. Spingardi died on 22 September 1918, apparently ill with malaria he had been infected by some Austrian prisoners in Asinara.
