= Luigi Rava =

Italian politician (1860–1938)

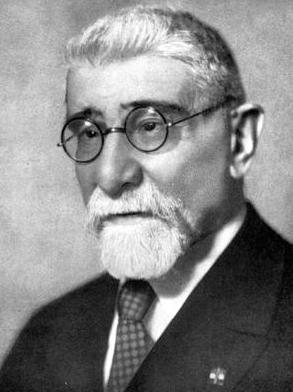
Luigi Rava

Luigi Rava (29 November 1860 – 12 May 1938) was an Italian politician. He was born in Ravenna. He served on the faculty of the University of Bologna. He was mayor of Rome (1920–1921). He served in the Chamber of Deputies and Senate of the Kingdom of Italy. He was a recipient of the Order of Saints Maurice and Lazarus. He died in Rome on 12 May 1938.

== Biography ==
Luigi Rava’s academic career began early: at just 23 years old, he began teaching at the university level as a lecturer. He obtained his first position in Siena, then taught in Bologna, and later in Pavia. He taught philosophy of law, public finance, and administrative law. He returned to Bologna, where he was appointed to the chair of Administrative Science at the University of Bologna, a position he held continuously until 1915, when he was appointed a member of the Council of State and subsequently moved to Rome.

Preceded by Adolfo Apolloni	Mayor of Rome; 1920–1921	Succeeded by Giannetto Valli
