= Carlo Mirabello =

Italian admiral and politician

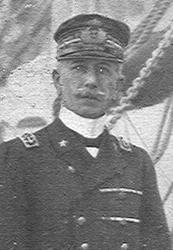

Senator
- In office 11 December 1904 – 24 March 1910

Minister of the Navy
- In office 10 December 1904 – 11 December 1909
- Preceded by: Giovanni Giolitti
- Succeeded by: Giovanni Bettolo

Carlo Mirabello (Tortona, 17 November 1847 – Milan, 24 March 1910) was an Italian admiral and politician. He served as Minister of the Navy in five successive governments of the Kingdom of Italy.

== Early naval career ==
Mirabello entered the Royal Navy School of Genoa in 1861 and on 1 February 1865 he was promoted to midshipman. He took part in the Third Italian War of Independence on the steam frigate Maria Adelaide, flagship of Vice Admiral Albini, and was present at the battle of Lissa. Soon afterwards he was transferred to the steam frigate Vittorio Emanuele and was appointed second lieutenant. In November 1866 he held his first naval command on lagoon gunboat "N.5 ". In 1867 he took command of the steamer Monzambano and in 1868 he assumed the command of lagoon gunboat "N.1".

== Cartography and hydrography ==
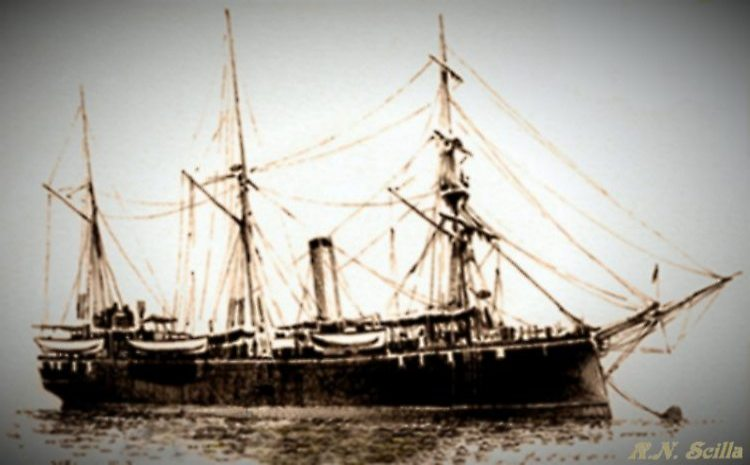
the Scilla

He was then transferred back to the Monzambano, now serving as a hydrographic vessel, with which he carried out an expedition along the Adriatic coast, earning him the title of knight of the Order of the Crown of Italy in 1871. On 1st Dec. In 1872 he was promoted to second lieutenant and sent for a year and a half to Trieste to supervise the publication of some of the hydrographic maps he had helped to prepare. In June 1874 he was placed in charge of mapping the coast and seabed of La Spezia and in January 1875 he set off on the steam frigate Maria Adelaide on a naval educational voyage that took him to Spain, Tunisia, Portugal and Gibraltar. On December 25th 1876 he was appointed lieutenant first class and from April 1877 to October 1880 he served on the hydrographic vessel Washington. On 1 July 1884 he was promoted to lieutenant captain and in 1885 he was given command of the torpedo boat Andromeda. In January 1886 he was appointed knight of the Order of Saints Maurice and Lazarus and was made commander of the gunboat Scilla, on which he carried out a hydrographic expedition in the Red Sea. In July 1887 he was promoted to frigate captain and from January to September 1889 he held the position of director of the naval hydrographic office in Genoa.

== Contribution to radiotelegraphy ==
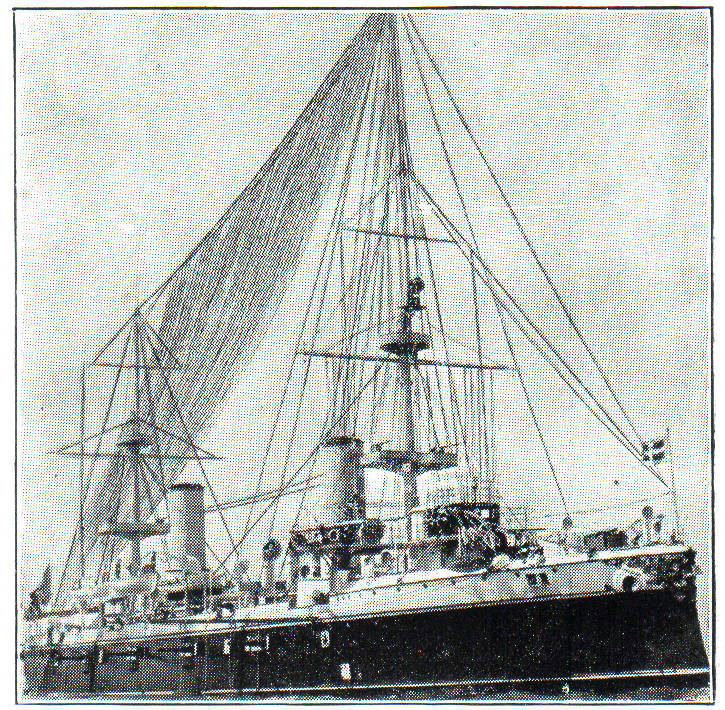
the Carlo Alberto equipped with Marconi’s antennae

Passionate about the technical innovations of the time, he followed with interest the experiments of Guglielmo Marconi, with whom he formed a long friendship. During an expedition to the Far East he established the first contact between the Italian legation in Beijing and ships at sea. In 1902, in command of the Carlo Alberto he accompanied Marconi on a cruise in the English Channel, the Baltic, the Mediterranean and the Atlantic. Through the experiments on this trip, Marconi was able to demonstrate that distance, oceans and mountains between radio stations did not impede communication.

== Crete, Somalia and China ==
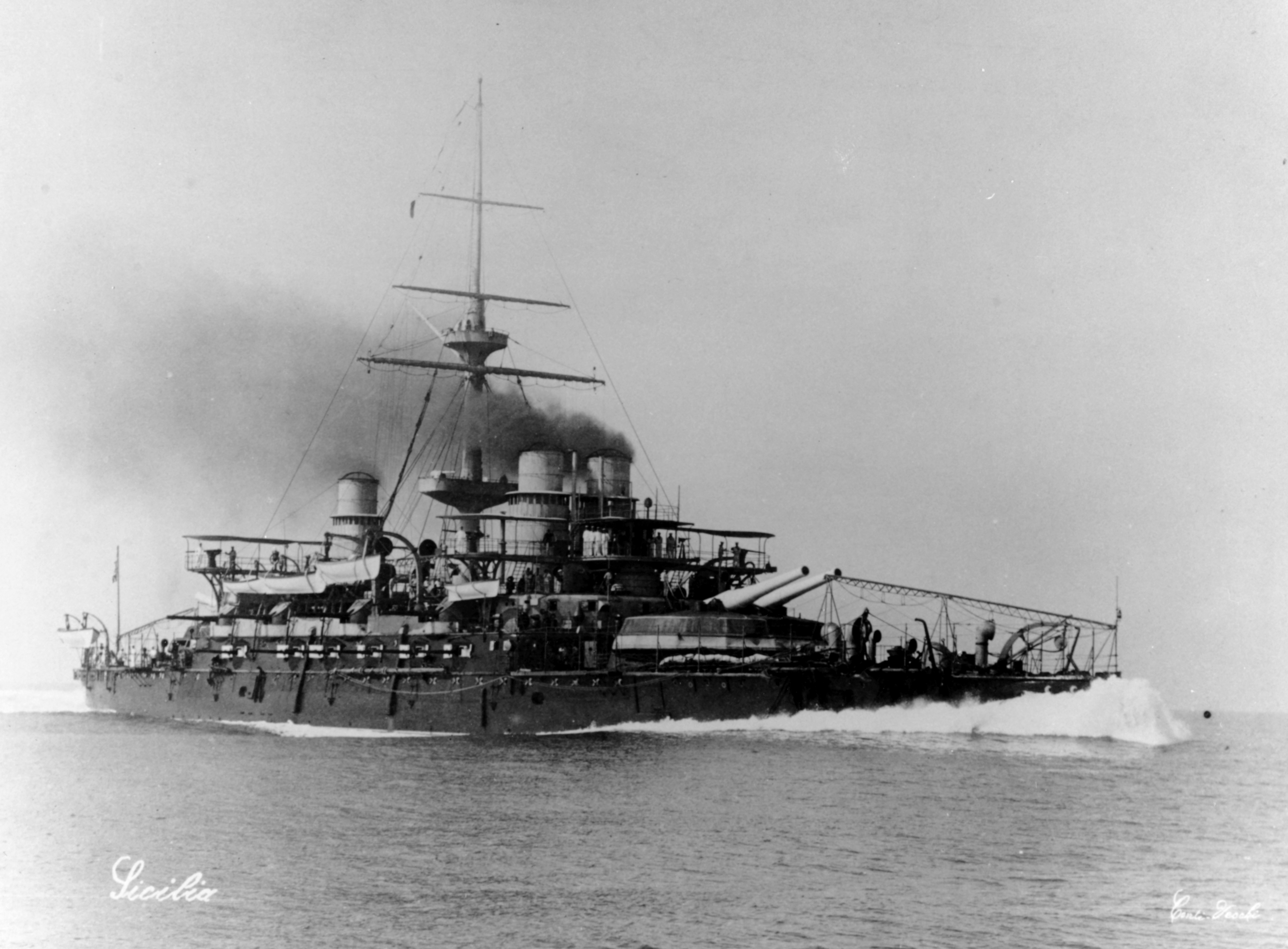
the Sicilia

Having obtained the rank of captain in July 1890, in January 1894 he was entrusted with command of the ironclad Lepanto, which he held until March 1896, and from February 1897 to June 1898 he commanded the battleship Sicilia.

In July 1898 he was awarded the title of Knight of the Military Order of Savoy for his support to Vice Admiral Canevaro, commander in chief of the international squadron that intervened in Crete. In the same month he was appointed chief of the General Staff Office, and in August he was promoted to rear admiral. From 1 March 1901 until the same date the following year he was superior commander of the Royal Maritime Crew Corps.

Assigned to command the Far East naval division, in March 1903 took command of the armored cruiser Vettor Pisani. While sailing towards China, Mirabello was ordered to investigate events in the Sultanate of Obbia following the operations conducted there by British troops, to install the new sultan Ali Yusuf Kenadid and to deliver a large number of weapons to him. Having carried out this mission, Mirabello continued on to the Far East.

== Ministerial career ==
While Mirabello was in the Far East he received a proposal for him to become Minister of the Navy in the second Giolitti government. The rationale was that he had never been involved in politics, and was considered to have the necessary integrity and impartiality to restore public confidence after the accusations of corruption levelled against the previous minister, Giovanni Bettolo. Mirabello agreed to serve and returned to Italy. On 3 November he took up his post and five days later he was appointed senator.

Mirabello went about his work as a minister in a way that commanded the confidence of his political opponents and the public. Thus just 18 months after he took office, in July 1905, parliament voted 132 million lire in extraordinary funds for naval construction with a further 24 million for munitions and torpedoes. Victor Emmanuel III regarded him so highly that he retained his services for five uninterrupted years in five successive cabinets. Before Mussolini took power in 1922, the only Navy Minister of the Kingdom of Italy who served longer than Mirabello was Benedetto Brin (1884-91).

One of the problems facing any Navy Minister was that building modern battleships was enormously expensive and technically demanding, while Italian shipyards were relatively inexperienced and there was always pressure to keep defence spending down. The result was that it took years to complete the building of each ship, so that by the time they were launched they were outclassed by faster-built British and French ships. It was thanks mainly to Mirabello that despite these conditions Italy had five dreadnoughts complete by the time it entered the First World War, with one more close to completion.

In addition to these battleships, the navy under Mirabello also acquired twenty-eight torpedo boats, ten counter-torpedo boats, a scout cruiser and three submarines. His final legacy to the navy, The Mirabello law of 27 June 1909, provided funds to order three other first-class battleships, two scout cruisers, thirty torpedo boats, six destroyers and eight submarines. As well as securing more ships he introduced many innovations such as the naval gunnery school and radiotelegraphy on all of the navy’s ships. Funds were assigned to naval exercises and the supply of coal for navigation doubled.

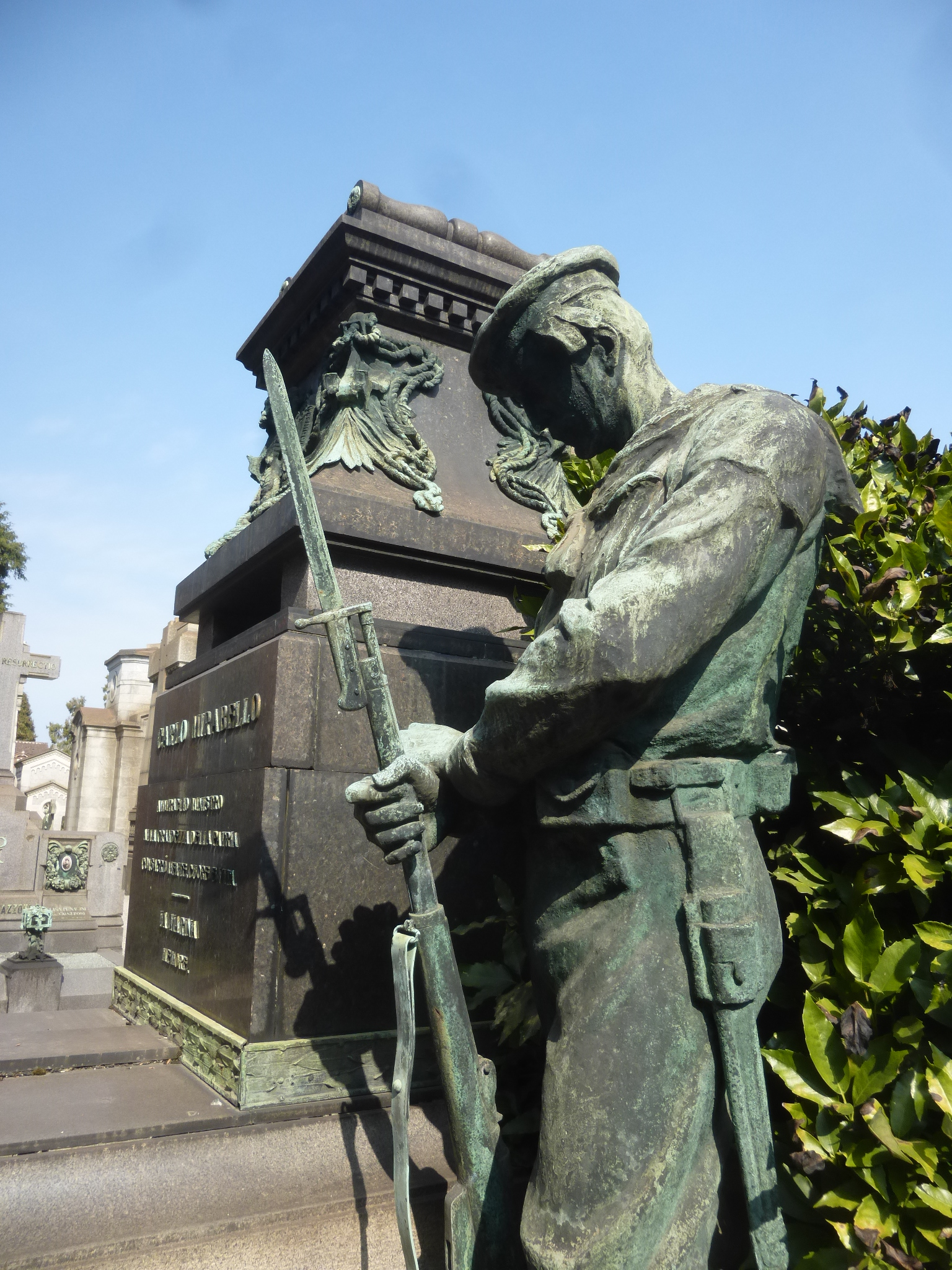
Monument to Carlo Mirabello, Milan

Although Italy had been formally allied with Austria-Hungary in the Triple Alliance since 1882, Mirabello sought to prepare Italy for a potential war with its neighbour. Hence he was the first Navy Minister to focus any effort on strengthening the maritime defences in the Adriatic. During his tenure torpedo boars were stationed along the coast, the post of Brindisi was fortified and a new reserve division was established in Taranto.

There was much criticism of Mirabello over the delays in getting the navy to support the victims of the 1908 Messina earthquake, at a time when many crews were at home on leave for Christmas.

Mirabello resigned as Minister of the Navy on 12 December 1909. Shortly afterwards, a bout of a malaria forced him to leave Rome and move in with his sisters in Milan, where he died on 24 March 1910. He was buried in the Monumental cemetery of Milan.

== Namesake ==
The Mirabello-class scout cruiser Carlo Mirabello, commissioned in 1916 and reclassified as a destroyer in 1938, was named after Mirabello. She took part in World War I, the Italian intervention in the Spanish Civil War, and World War II and sank after striking a mine in 1941.

== Honours ==
Carlo Mirabello held a number of Italian and foreign honours.

Grand Cordone of the Order of Saints Maurice and Lazarus - ribbon for ordinary uniform

Grand Cordone of the Order of Saints Maurice and Lazarus

Grand Cordon of the Order of the Crown of Italy - ribbon for ordinary uniform

Grand Cordon of the Order of the Crown of Italy

Knight of the Military Order of Savoy - ribbon for ordinary uniform

Knight of the Military Order of Savoy

Knight First Class of the Order of the Red Eagle (Prussia) - ribbon for ordinary uniform

Knight First Class of the Order of the Red Eagle (Prussia)

Knight Second Class of the Order of the Crown (Prussia) - ribbon for ordinary uniform

Knight Second Class of the Order of the Crown (Prussia)
