= Operations in Valtellina (1866) =

Battle of the Third Italian War of Independence

- Part of Third Italian War of Independence
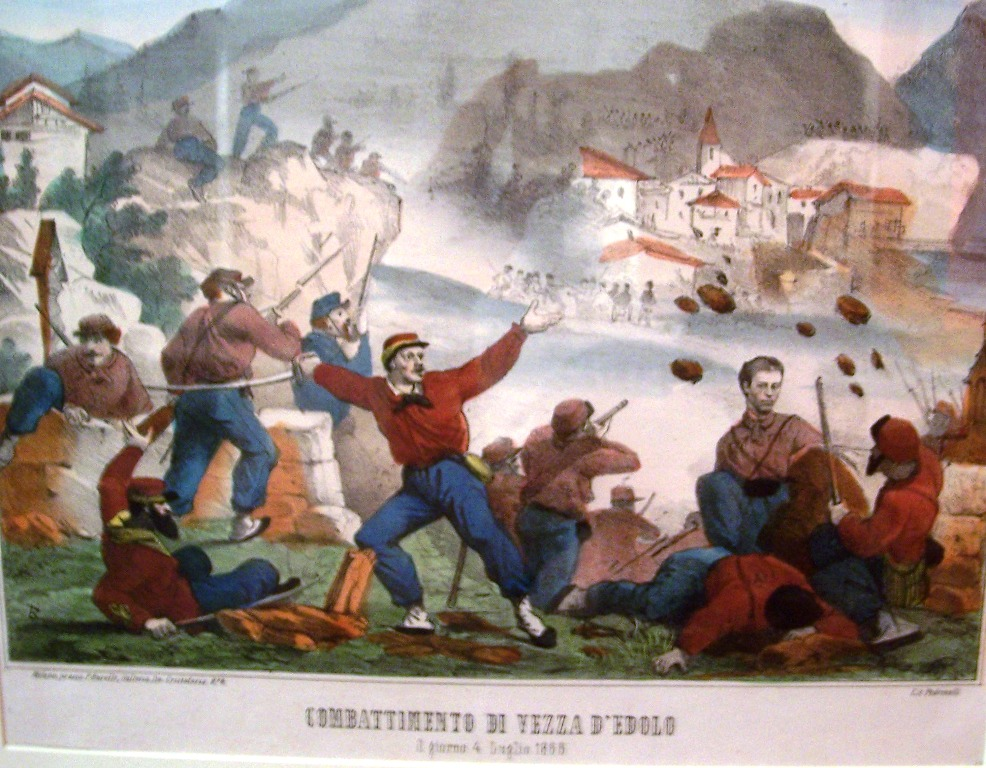
Date	June – July 1866
Location	Valtellina, Trentino, Austrian Empire
Result	Inconclusive

Belligerents
Italy	Austria

Commanders and leaders
Enrico Guicciardi; Pietro Pedranzini	Ulysses von Albertini; Alexander von Metz

Units involved
Italian Volunteer Corps	8th Division

Strength
1,200	Unknown

Casualties and losses
Unknown	Unknown killed, 65 prisoners

The Operations in Valtellina was a battle of the Third Italian War of Independence and consisted in the penetration of Austrian units of the 8th Division of General Franz Kuhn von Kuhnenfeld operating in Trentino against the Italian Volunteer Corps of Giuseppe Garibaldi and in the subsequent Italian counterattack of the Mobile National Guard commanded by Colonel Enrico Guicciardi.

== Background ==
Italian commanders
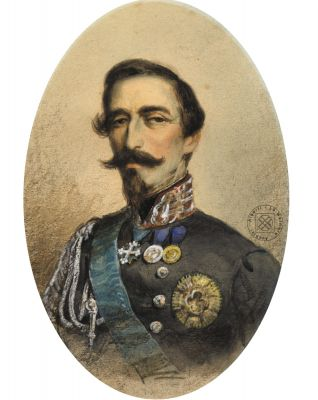
Gen.
Alfonso La Marmora
(I Army)

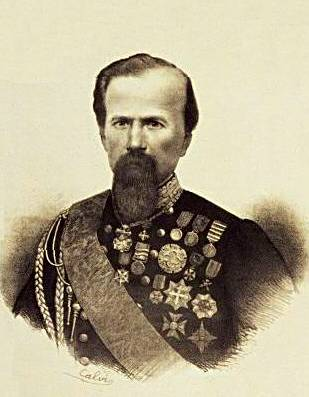
Gen.
Enrico Cialdini
(II Army)

At the outbreak of the Third Italian War of Independence, on June 23, 1866, the Italian army was divided into two armies: the first, under the command of Alfonso Ferrero La Marmora and was stationed in Lombardy west of the Mincio towards the fortresses of the Quadrilatero. The second, under the command of General Enrico Cialdini in Emilia-Romagna, south of the Po River, towards Mantua and Rovigo.

The long Alpine front, on the other hand, was entrusted to the Italian Volunteer Corps of Giuseppe Garibaldi, who was entrusted with the task of controlling the long stretch of border that divided Lombardy from Tyrol and Trentino, mainly through two penetration routes: the Passo dello Stelvio, to the north, and the Passo del Tonale, to the center. Along the third route of penetration, Lake Idro, to the south, General Giuseppe Garibaldi himself had the task of guiding the bulk of the volunteers to penetrate towards Trento.

== Austrian Advance ==
Since the end of June the Austrian command of the Tyrol had commanded to advance close to the passes, occupying the western slopes and, if possible, to advance further. By doing this, the Austrian commander in Tyrol, General Franz Kuhn von Kuhnenfeld replied to a telegram received on June 29, a few days after the Italian defeat at the Battle of Custoza, from Archduke Albrecht:

Keep Tonale and Stelvio passages manned with permanent shooters, at the same time advance along these passes with mobile troops on Edolo, Tirano, Teglio, from there to wage a small war.

The first action occurred at Tonale, where a first detachment was brought, which the Italians would have tried, in vain, to dislodge, at the battle of Vezza d'Oglio . The Austrian advance had also proceeded from the second of the great Alpine passes that divide Italian Lombardy from the then Austrian Tyrol: the Stelvio Pass.

On July 2, a column descended from the Stelvio Pass had occupied Bormio. On the evening of July 3, a detachment of about fifty men had proceeded much farther on, on the Mortirolo Pass, to check for any connections between the volunteers from Valcamonica and those from Valtellina.

== Italian Counter-Offensive ==
The Mobile National Guard (the 44th battalion) of Colonel Enrico Guicciardi (Valtellina noble, veteran of the second Italian war of independence where he had fought at the head of a Valtellinese Battalion) with 1,200 men, organized the defense of the valley at the Sondalo squeeze. The unit was joined by 23 carabinieri under the command of an officer.

In the meantime, however, following the news about the Austrian defeat at the Battle of Königgrätz, the Austrians ceased all offensive intentions on the Italian front and Kuhn acted accordingly. In any case, the steps had to be kept.

However the Austrians were weakened and on July 11, at midnight, an Italian squad, led by Pietro Pedranzini from Bormio, began the ascent of the rugged Reit pass, to swoop by surprise on the first roadman of the Stelvio, capturing the entire detachment, 65 prisoners. To convince them to surrender, Pedranzini made the enemies believe they were surrounded by causing the rolling of boulders from the mountain.

== Aftermath ==
The Austrian action had, however, been exhausted, and it was now clear, from those commands, that no threat from the Italian side would come from Valtellina. As a result, only sporadic skirmishes were recorded in the following weeks.

The Guicciardi Legion remained in Bormio until 23 September and then dissolved in Sondrio on the 28th of the same month. The operation wouldn't have been forgotten however as between 1908 and 1912, the Italian army proceeded to build Forte Venini, in honor of the Valtellinese Captain Venini and the construction of the small fort on Monte Scale, dominating the Bormio basin and the Stelvio road.
