= Armistice of Cormons =

1866 peace agreement between Italy and the Austrian Empire

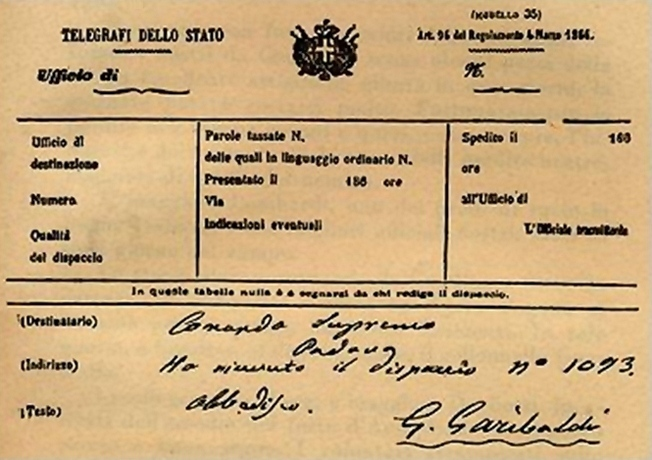
Garibaldi's telegram: Obbedisco ("I obey").

The Armistice of Cormòns was signed in Cormons on 12 August 1866, between the Kingdom of Italy (represented by General Count Agostino Petitti Bagliani di Roreto) and the Austrian Empire (represented by General Baron Karl Möring) and was a prelude to the Treaty of Vienna, which ended the Third Italian War of Independence.

On 21 July 1866 the victorious Prussia, which had just inflicted a decisive defeat on the Austrian army at the Battle of Königgrätz, signed the Armistice of Nikolsburg (without consulting the Italian allies). In the same days the Italian Navy was defeated in the Battle of Lissa. On the contrary the Royal Italian Army was taking advantage of the redeployment of many Austrian units to the northern front. Garibaldi's volunteers, reinforced by regular units, gained terrain by invading Trentino and achieved a victory at Bezzecca; the main Italian army led by General Enrico Cialdini reached Udine, while a secondary army led by General Alfonso La Marmora was contemporary blocking some Austrian forces in the Quadrilatero fortresses.

After the armistice of Nikolsburg, the Italian General Staff ordered to withdraw from Trentino (which was too tied to the Habsburg Empire to be claimed). Garibaldi replied by telegraph with a sentence that became famous: Obbedisco ("I obey").

Soon after Prussia and Austria signed the Peace of Prague, while the definitive peace between Italy and Austria was ratified only on 3 October 1866 by the Treaty of Vienna, with the mediation of Napoleon III. The Austrian Empire recognized formally the Kingdom of Italy and ceded Venetia (that comprised the Province of Mantua, Veneto valley and western Friuli) to the French Empire, which in turn ceded it to Italy. This represented the final dissolution of the Kingdom of Lombardy–Venetia, as mainland Lombardy (less Mantua province) had been ceded to Sardinia-Piedmont by the Treaty of Zürich in 1859.

== Bibliography ==
- Wawro, Geoffrey (1997). The Austro-Prussian War: Austria's war with Prussia and Italy in 1866. Cambridge University Press. ISBN 978-0-521-62951-5.
