= Austria–Italy border =

International border

Austro-Italian border
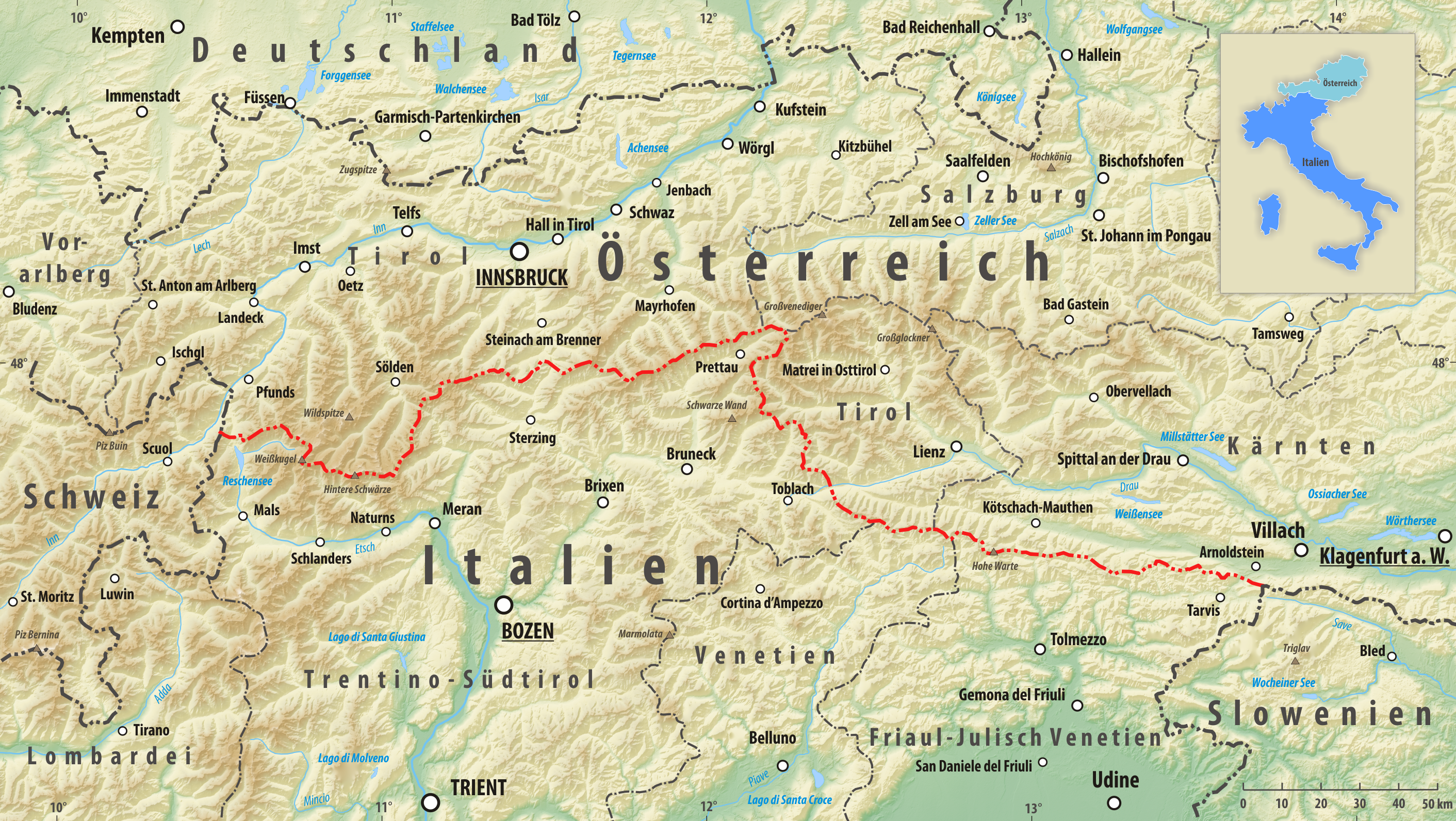

Characteristics
- Entities: Austria Italy
- Length: 404 kilometres (251 mi)

History
- Established: 17 March 1861; Creation of the Kingdom of Italy
- Current shape: 10 February 1947; Signing of the Paris Peace Treaties
- Treaties: Treaty of Vienna; Treaty of Saint-Germain-en-Laye; Paris Peace Treaties

The Austrian–Italian border is a 404 km (251 mi) land border along the Alps between the Republic of Italy and the Republic of Austria. Although a border between Austria and Italy has existed since the 1861 Proclamation of the Kingdom of Italy, most of the current modern-day border was only established in 1920, after the First World War. It has been an EU internal border since 1 January 1995. The border was last changed in 1947.

== History ==
The border of 1861 had been established shortly before the Kingdom of Italy between the Austrian Empire and Italy's predecessors the Kingdom of Sardinia and its client state the United Provinces of Central Italy. The border between Austria and the United Provinces had until 1859 been the Austrian border with the Duchy of Modena and Reggio, and the Papal States; these had mostly been established in 1815 by the Congress of Vienna following the French Revolutionary and Napoleonic Wars and broadly restored those states to their pre-revolution territories. Rolo had been Austrian until it was sold to Modena in 1850, and until 1847 part of the border with Modena had been that of the Guastalla exclave of Parma and Piacenza. The border with Sardinia itself had been established in the 1859 Treaty of Zürich when Austria ceded the western half of its Lombardy–Venetia crown land to Sardinia (via France). Italian Lombardy bordered the Austrian County of Tyrol in the north-east and the remaining Austrian part of Lombardy–Venetia in the south-east; Austrian Lombardy–Venetia also bordered Italian Emilia-Romagna to the south.

A substantial change occurred in 1866 with the Treaty of Vienna, which saw the remainder of Lombardy–Venetia ceded to Italy. Much of the border now followed the historical boundary between the Habsburg Monarchy/Holy Roman Empire and the Republic of Venice until the latter was dissolved in 1797, which had been the basis for the Lombardo–Venetian boundary established in 1815. Lombardy continued to border Tyrol; Italian Veneto bordered Tyrol, the Duchy of Carinthia and the Austrian Littoral. Part of this 1866 border survives between the modern Austrian East Tyrol and Carinthia and the Italian Veneto and Friuli-Venezia Giulia. Other parts survive in the boundaries of Trentino-Alto Adige/Südtirol, and in the Italy-Slovenia border.

Since then the biggest changes to the border were in 1920, when southern Tyrol (what is now Trentino-Alto Adige/Südtirol) and the area around Tarvisio were ceded to Italy under the terms of the Treaty of London and the subsequent Treaty of Saint-Germain-en-Laye. The part of Tyrol left to Austria was split into two parts – North Tyrol and East Tyrol – with a small portion of Salzburg now on the Italian border between them; all three border the now-Italian South Tyrol. Veneto now bordered East Tyrol and Carinthia. The former Austrian Littoral, with which Italy had shared its eastern border, was also ceded, becoming (along with part of Carniola) Venezia Giulia. Carinthia briefly bordered Venezia Giulia, but Tarvisio soon became part of Veneto, separating them. Austrian territories to the east of Venezia Giulia became part of the Kingdom of Serbs, Croats and Slovenes (later the Kingdom of Yugoslavia).

In 1938 Austria was annexed by Nazi Germany, so its border with Italy became the German-Italian border until Austria was restored in 1945.

When the Friuli-Venezia Giulia region was established it took over almost all of Venetia's boundary with Carinthia.

== Provinces and states along the border ==
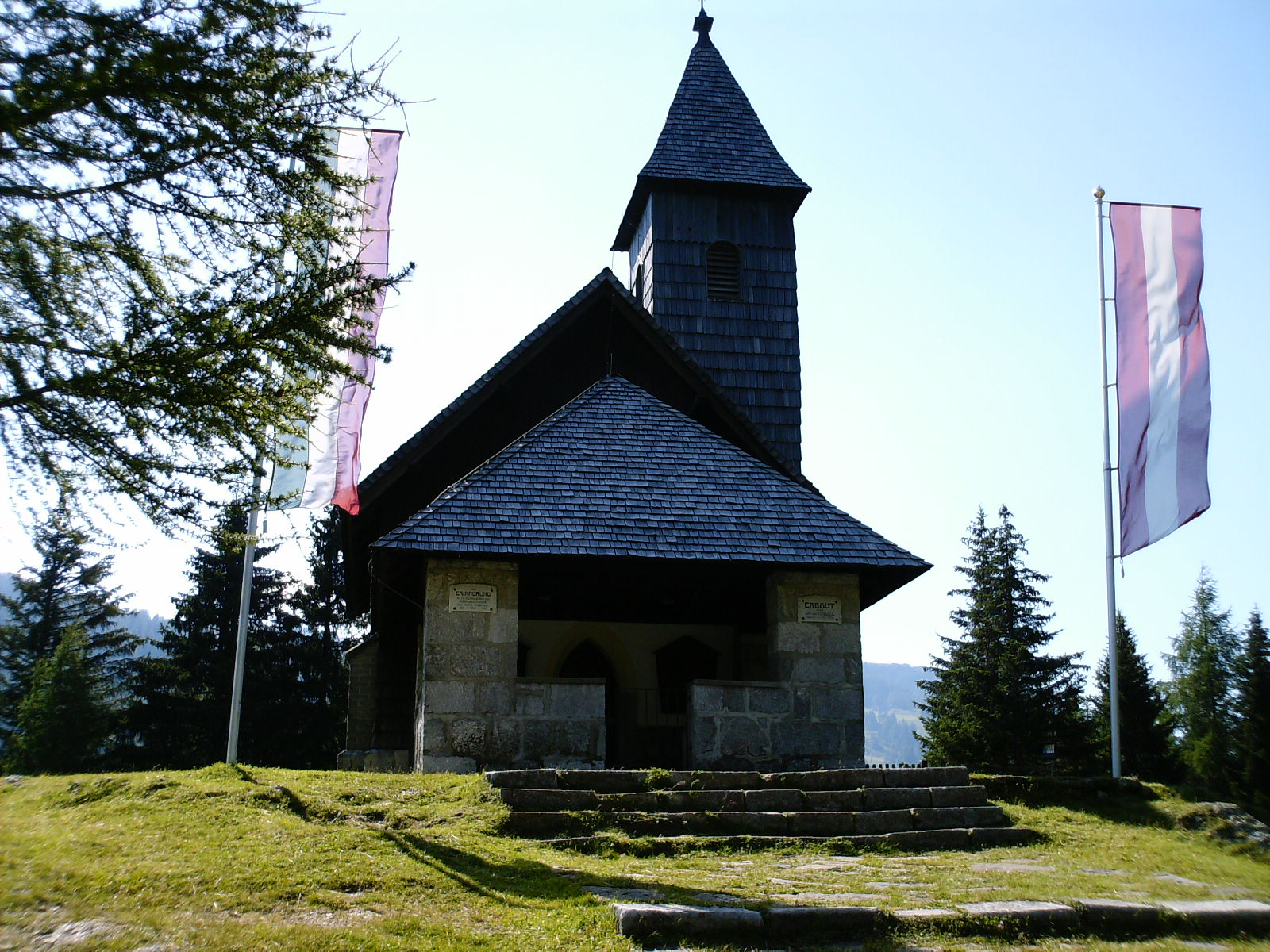
Church at the border at Nassfeld

=== Italy ===
- Trentino-Alto Adige/Südtirol
- Veneto
- Friuli-Venezia Giulia

=== Austria ===
- Tyrol
- Salzburg
- Carinthia

== Traffic ==
The main arterial routes over this border go over the Brenner Pass. It has:

- European route E45 (Autobahn A13 and Autostrada A22)
- Brenner Railway

Other important routes are:

- European route E55 (Autobahn A2 and Autostrada A23)
- European route E66

== See also ==
- Treaty of Saint-Germain-en-Laye (1919)
- Tyrol–South Tyrol–Trentino Euroregion
