= Pietro Pedranzini =

Italian colonel (1825–1903)

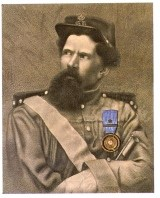
- Born: 9 October 1826; Bormio, Lombardy–Venetia, Austria
- Died: 3 September 1903 (aged 76); Bormio, Lombardy, Italy
- Military career
- Allegiance: Provisional Government of Milan; Sardinia; Italy
- Branch: Royal Sardinian Army; Royal Italian Army
- Service years: 1847 – c. 1866
- Rank: Lieutenant
- Conflicts: First Italian War of Independence; Expedition of the Thousand; Third Italian War of Independence: Operations in Valtellina
- Awards: Gold Medal of Military Valour

Pietro Pedranzini (9 October 1826 – 3 September 1903) was an Italian Lieutenant of the First Italian War of Independence and the Third Italian War of Independence. He was one of the main commanders behind the Operations in Valtellina and received a Gold Medal of Military Valour for his service.

== Childhood ==
Pietro was born on 9 October 1826 in Bormio, a town in the Lombardy region of the Alps in northern Italy. His parents were peasants, and Pietro had five older sisters and two younger brothers. When he was 11, his father died, but Pietro was able to attend elementary school. In 1842, he enrolled in the re-opened gymnasium at Bormio, but dropped out during his third year to resume work in the field.

== First Italian War of Independence ==
In 1847, he managed to evade the draft by the Austrian army due to heart disease. At the time, the Austrian Empire controlled the Kingdom of Lombardy–Venetia, which stretched from Milan to Venice and north into the Alps. There were a number of rebellions against Austrian rule in 1848, beginning with the Sicilian revolution of 1848 in January. The people of Milan rose up in March, and the Provisional Government of Milan carried out a draft.

Pedranzini was enlisted with the rank of corporal and assigned to the first bersaglieri company of the battalion of Valtellina conscripts. On 20 March 1848, Pietro and a squad of about twenty men went to the Stelvio Pass to guard the border with Switzerland. Pedranzini also participated in supplying Austrian weapons to the Italian forces. He was present for the proclamation of the Republic of Stelvio-Tonale on 12 August 1848. Later in August, Pedranzini and the men of his team—almost all soldiers from the Bormio district—had to abandon the garrison as the Austrians threatened their position. They retreated through the Cristallo Glacier (descending to Bormio via the Cristallo Pass).

The revolutions all ultimately failed; the Austrian Empire put down the various rebellions and regained control of their territories by August 1849.

== Second Italian War of Independence ==
Pedranzini married in 1856 and by 1859, due to having two children, he couldn't volunteer for the Second Italian War of Independence. In 1859, the Austrians occupied the Giogo dello Stelvio and the Alta Valle del Braulio; they garrisoned the IV Cantoniera and the summit of Spondalunga, recruiting about sixty workers from Bormio and its surroundings to carry out fortifications. Once Garibaldi's redshirts of eight or nine thousand men—commanded by Nino Bixio and Alessandro Natale Medici—arrived in Bormio, Pedranzini submitted a plan to Bixio to retake the Giogo. Pedranzini, having obtained information from some escaped workers of the Austrian contingent, suggested a bold, circumventing, and surprising action through the Passo del Cristallo to be conducted with seven to eight hundred men chosen among the best. Bixio dismissed the proposal however, calling it a una ragazzata, ("A bad prank").

== Expedition of the Thousand and political career ==
In 1861, during the Expedition of the Thousand, a battalion of the National Guard under Major Giovan Battista Caimi was mobilized in Valtellina for the garrison of Bologna. Pedranzini enlisted with the rank of sergeant, serving for two months as an instructor.

Returning from service with the rank of lieutenant, he participated in the municipal elections of Bormio, in which he was elected senior councillor. He served in this position until 1864, when he assumed the position of municipal secretary, a job he held until shortly before his death in 1903.

== Third Italian War of Independence ==
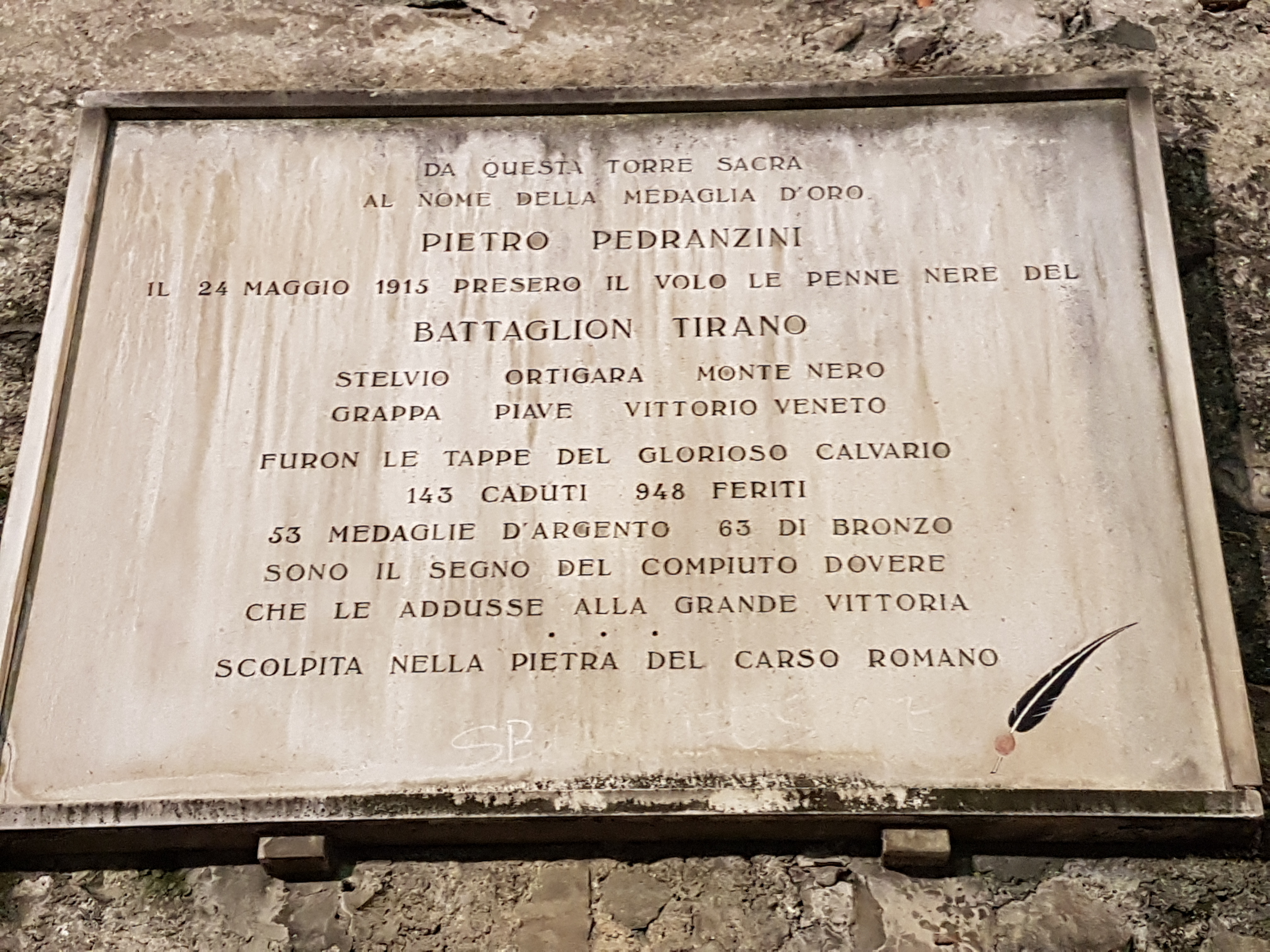
A commemorative plaque of Pedranzini at Bormio.

In 1866, Lieutenant Pedranzini commanded the second squad, consisting of eleven soldiers and two carabinieri. On 20 June, his squad left for the Stelvio Pass to maintain surveillance. On the 22nd, the garrison was reinforced by ten Forest Guards accompanied by Inspector Giuseppe Cetti, as well as 26 national guardsmen who arrived under the command of Lieutenant Francesco Clementi. On the 23rd, Colonel Enrico Guicciardi, commander of the legion of the National Guard formed by the 44th (Vallecamonica) and 45th (Valtellina) battalions, arrived at the Stelvio Pass with Major Giovan Battista Caimi, inspector of the GN and commander of the Valtellina battalion. On leaving, Guicciardi ordered a retreat to prevent a clash with Austrian soldiers.

Around the same time however, Bormio was subjected to raids, abuse and slavery by the Austrian troops who had their headquarters at the Stelvio Pass. On 11 July 1866 Pedranzini, alone, climbed the Cima Reit to a passage that would later become known as the "Pedranzini Pass". The passage descended from the scree of Glandadura towards the Stelvio Pass at the height of the Cantoniera. Pedranzini then blew a horn, fired a muzzle-loaded rifle, and rolled several boulders to create a commotion; his actions frightened the 65 Austrians below, who took refuge and locked themselves up in the entrance hall of the Cantoniera.

Pedranzini forced the Austrians to surrender, and succeeded in bringing them back to Bormio as prisoners. After this, Bormio was no longer harassed by the Austrians. For these events, on 19 April 1867, Pedranzini was awarded the Gold Medal of Military Valour "with an annual increase of two hundred lire."

== Medal Citation ==
For having guided the Zambelli column along the very difficult and dangerous pass of the Reit that cut the retreat of the Austrians and for having gone down, first of all, on the post road to intercept the pass of the fugitives and determine the surrender of 75 prisoners with very serious personal risk.

— Passo dello Stelvio, 11 July 1866
