= Pedranzini =

Pedranzini may refer to:

- Fabrizio Pedranzini (born 1954), Italian ski mountaineer and cross-country skier
- Federico Pedranzini (born 1989), Italian ski mountaineer
- Giambattista Pedranzini (1711–1761), Franciscan missionary
- Pietro Pedranzini (1826-1903), Italian Lieutenant
- Roberta Pedranzini (born 1971), Italian ski mountaineer
