= Naval operations on Lake Garda (1866) =

- Part of the Third Italian War of Independence
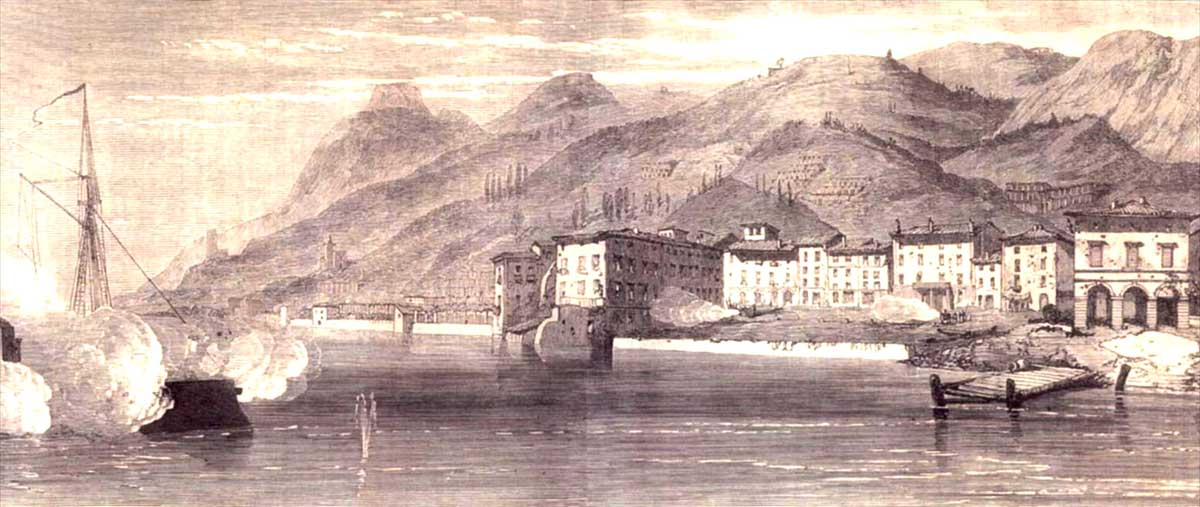
- Gargnano being bombarded by Austrian ships.
Date	25 June – 25 July 1866
Location	Lake Garda, Venetia
Result	Austrian victory

Belligerents
Kingdom of Italy	Austria

Commanders and leaders
Augusto Elia; Giuseppe Avezzana	Moritz Manfroni von Montfort

Strength
5 gunboats 1 regiment of volunteers 4 artillery batteries	22 boats including: 2 steamers; 6 propeller gunboats; 3 sailing gunboats

Casualties and losses
Steamship Benaco captured 3 dead 8 injured	2 damaged gunboats

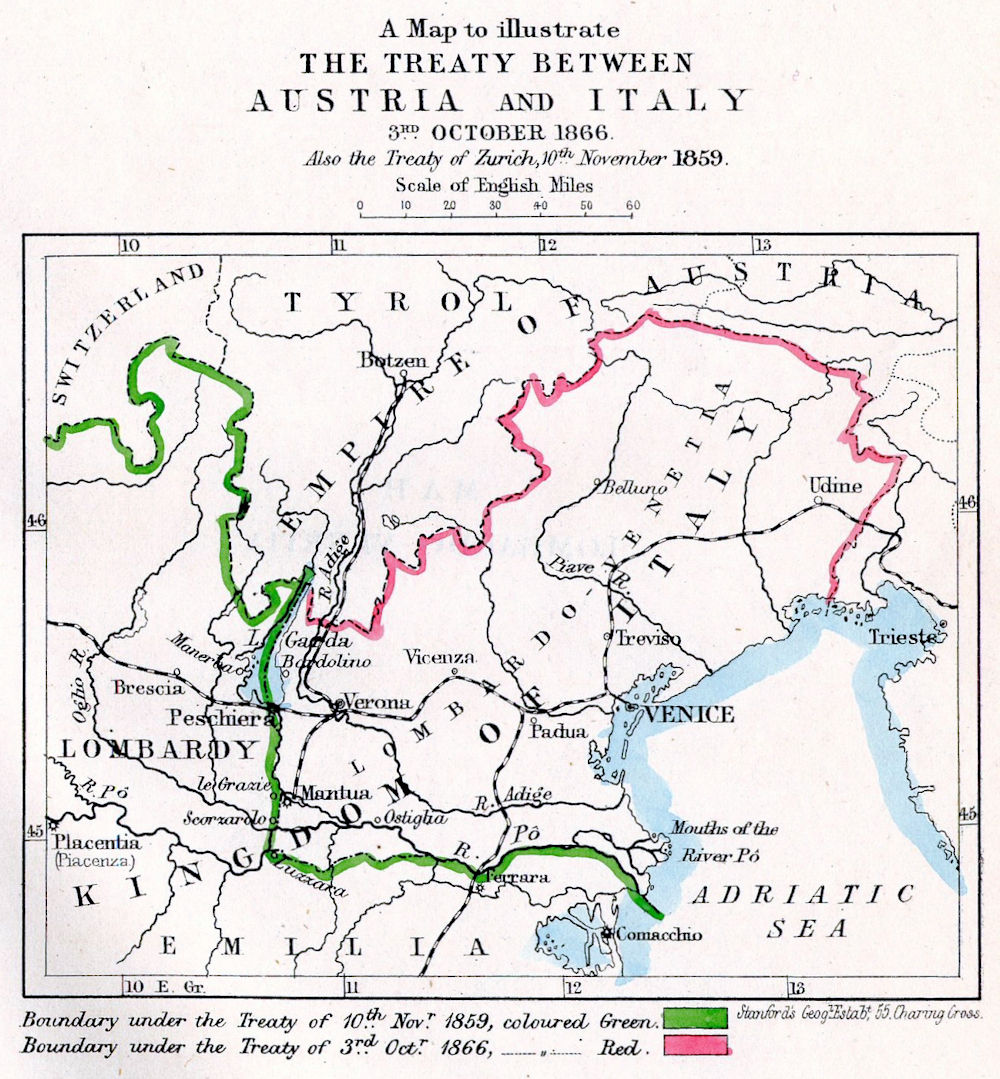
Map showing Lake Garda on the frontier between Italy and Austria, 1866

The naval operations on Lake Garda in 1866 during the Third Italian War of Independence consisted of a series of clashes between flotillas of the Kingdom of Italy and the Austrian Empire between 25 June and 25 July that year, as they attempted to secure dominance of the lake. The Austrian fleet, based on the eastern bank of the lake, was larger, more modern and better-armed than their Italian counterpart, and successfully maintained control of the waters, hindering the movement of Italian troops.

== Background ==
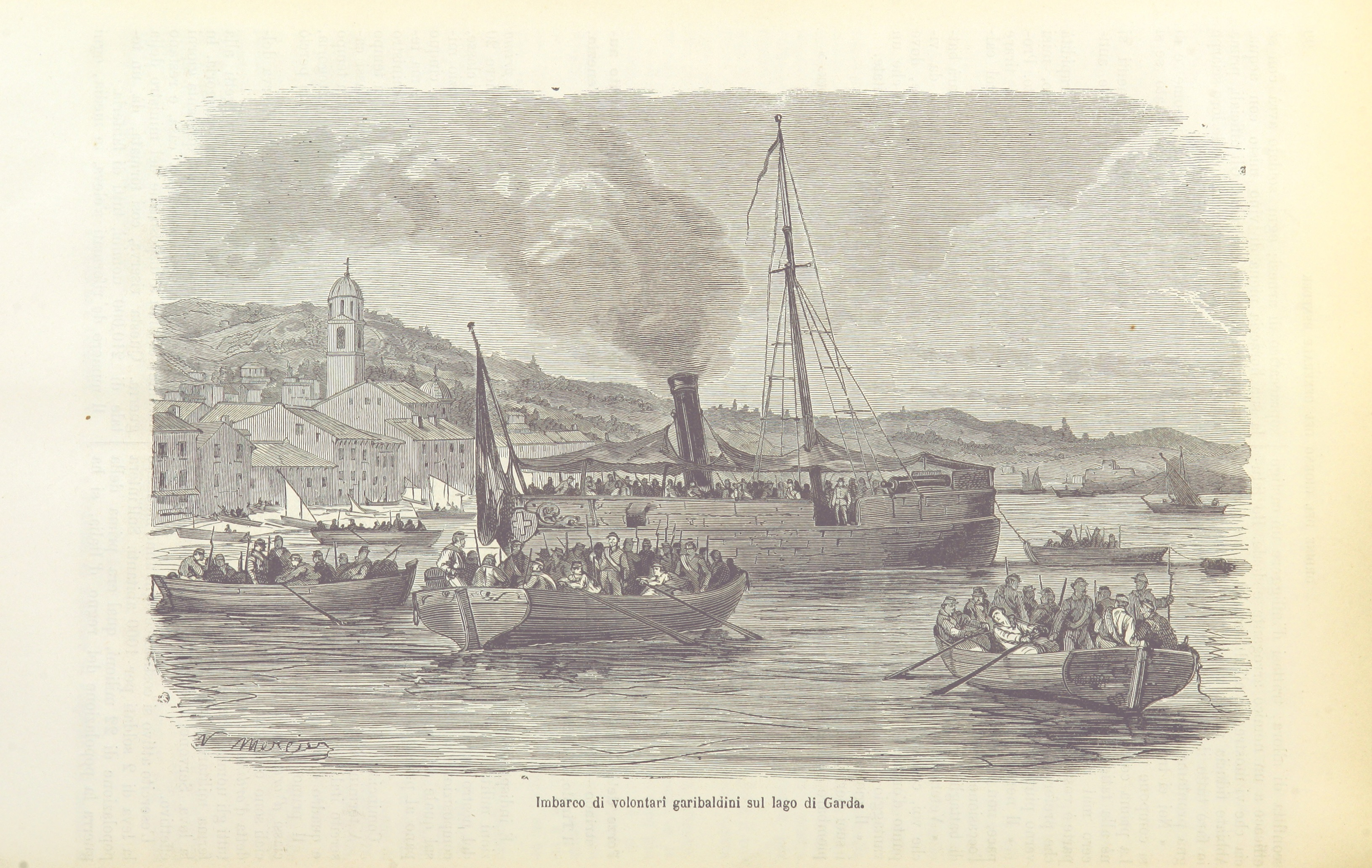
Garibaldian volunteers embarking on Lake GardaGarda

At the outset of the war, the border between Austria and Italy ran down the middle of the lake. The Brescia region to the west lay within Italy while Verona and the lands east of the lake were Austrian. Austria controlled Riva del Garda at the northern tip of the lake, as well as the important fortress of Peschiera del Garda on the west bank of the River Mincio at its southern end. Peschiera was part of the so-called 'Quadrilatero' of strong core Austrian defences, leaving the exposed eastern shore of Lake Garda an area of potential weakness, vulnerable to Italian infiltration. This might have involved a strike from the north end of the Lake up the valley of the Chiese river to threaten Trento and cut off the supply lines of the Austrian forces in the Veneto. It might also have involved a landing of forces behind Peschiera to threaten Verona. On the Italian side, the buildup of Austrian naval strength caused concerns about a possible Austrian attack across the lake towards Brescia.

== The opposing forces ==
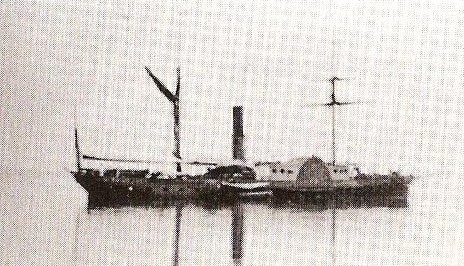
The Austrian paddle steamer Hess

During the years before 1866 war Austria had built up a powerful flotilla of steam-powered screw gunboats on Lake Garda. The Garda flotilla had seen some action during the 1859 war against France, when the Austrian gunboat Benaco was sunk off Salò by a Piedmontese battery on 20 June 1859. Afterwards the Emperor Franz Josef, on the suggestion of his brother, Navy Commander Archduke Ferdinand Max, moved it from army to navy control. With its headquarters in Torri del Benaco on the east bank of the lake, supported by the fortified bases at Peschiera and Riva del Garda, it Included 22 boats: 6 modern screw-driven gunboats—Wildfang, Raufbold, Wespe, Uskoke, Scharfschütze and Speiteufel, 2 large armed paddlesteamers (Hess and Franz Joseph), a dozen launches, a pair of armed barges at Peschiera for use as floating batteries, a half-dozen unarmed sailboats for scouting purposes and the 3rd Marine Infantry Company stationed at Peschiera, giving a total armament of 62 cannons and 10 mortars. In May this flotilla was placed under the command of Corvetten-Capitän Moriz Manfroni von Manfort, a well-known gunnery expert. He first placed his flag on board the Hess, with its larger and more comfortable accommodation, but shifted his command to the more effective Speiteufel on 10 June as war appeared imminent.

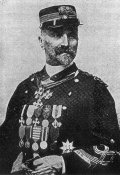
Augusto Elia

The Italian Garda squadron had its headquarters on the west bank of the lake in Salò. It consisted of two Italian-built wooden steam gunboats, the Solferino and San Martino, a third steam gunboat, the Torrione, donated by Napoleon III in 1859 (the Frassineto, Castenedolo and Pozzolengo, also donated by Napoleon, were out of service at the start of the conflict), and the paddle steamer Verbania, later renamed the Benaco. It also included a company of light infantry, the "Cacciatori di Garda", and once war broke out more ground forces were attached, including the 1st Battalion of the 10th Volunteer Regiment from Garibaldi's corps and a detachment of seven heavy guns. The Italians gathered as many sailboats and other small craft as they could and concentrated them at their base at Salò at the southwestern corner of the lake for possible use in amphibious assaults across the lake. The flotilla was commanded by Lieutenant Colonel Augusto Elia.

== Operations ==
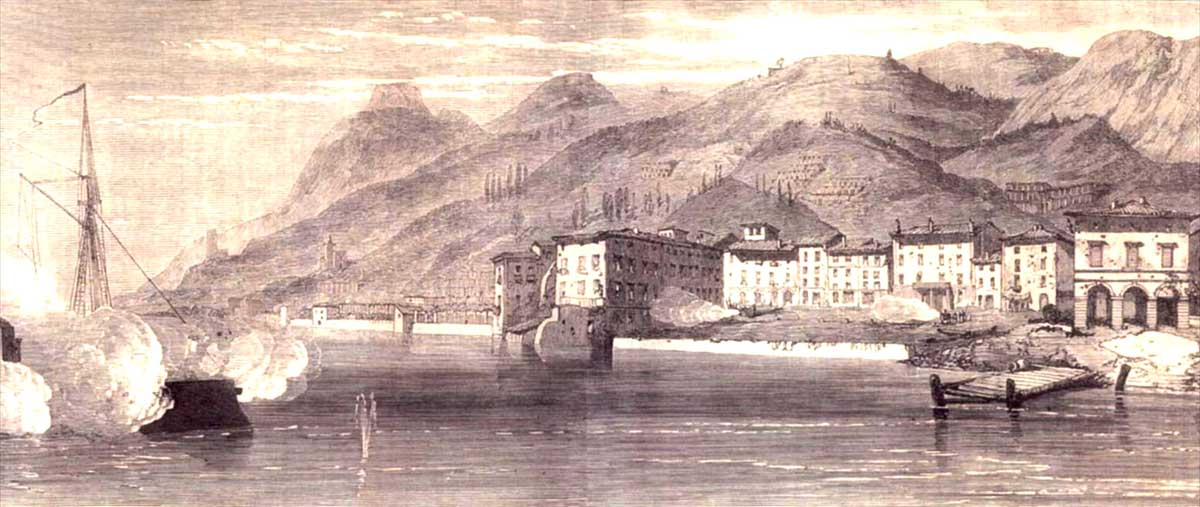
Gargnano being bombarded by the Austrian navy, 1866

At the start of hostilities of 25 June, the Austrians immediately sailed out to threaten Salò and prevent any movement of Italian troops. On June 30, the Austrian ships bombarded the railway station at Desenzano, a supply and communications point for the Italian Volunteer Corps of Giuseppe Garibaldi, but caused only minor damage. More substantial action took place on July 2, at 5 am, when four Austrian gunboats, including the Hess and Franz Joseph, bombarded the centre of Gargnano, where there was a strong concentration of Garibaldi's forces. The bombardment caused extensive damage to homes, one dead and eight wounded among the defending volunteers of the 2nd Regiment. The Austrian flotilla was eventually compelled to withdraw under fire from an Italian battery commanded by Captain Achille Afan de Rivera.

Other skirmishes took place on the lake every few days. On 6 July, Italian volunteer forces, equipped with nine long-range guns borrowed from a coastal battery at Maderno, ambushed the Austrian gunboat Wildfang at Gargnagno. The gunboat was hit twice, for no losses for Garibaldi's army. At the same time, the Italian flotilla sailed out from Salò to chase the armoured gunboat Wespe, on patrol off Maderno. The Austrian vessel managed to disengage after receiving support from Speiteufel and Scharfschütze. Italian sources claim that the Wespe was forced to seek shelter at Malcesine. The next significant combat occurred on July 19 when the Italian paddle steamer Benaco head out from Salò for Gargnano towing the sailboat Poeta, both ships carrying reinforcement troops and loaded with supplies for the volunteers in the mountains of Valvestino and Tremosine. The Benaco was suddenly attacked by two Austrian gunboats, the Wildfang and Schwarzschütze, which forced it in to shore near Gargnano, where most of the crew, troops and supplies were landed during the night. The next morning Austrian whalerboats were able to capture the abandoned Benaco, still with a small gun and some rifle ammunition in her holds, and tow it away as a prize to Peschiera. One of the whalerboats capsized under Italian fire, but was eventually recovered by the Austrian flotilla. Three Austrian sailors were wounded, while heavy shelling on Gargnano killed two Italian volunteers. The Poeta managed to sail away, only to sink shortly after off San Carlo. A second convoy from Salò, consisting in another sailboat escorted by the Italian flotilla, was forced back two days later by the Austrian gunboats Speiteufel, Uskoke and Wespe. The Benaco was handed back to the Italian government at the end of the hostilities.

The final action of the war took place at the north end of the lake. After skirmishes on the lake on 24 July, Manfroni learned that the Austrian army had abandoned Riva del Garda, which was one of his key supply points. To prevent the town falling to Garibaldi, he steamed north and occupied the fortifications in the town with his marines, and on 25 July his forces were able to hold off Garibaldi's volunteers until nightfall. At 10 p.m. the Hess arrived with a telegram confirming that a ceasefire had been declared between Austria and Italy.

== Conclusion ==
The Austrian fleet succeeded in dominating the lake until the end of the war, preventing any movement of Italian forces onto the eastern shore. It also hindered the movement of Italian supplies along the west coast and slowed down any effective attack into the Chiesa valley.

The Austrian flotilla did not long outlive the war. The armistice of 25 July was followed by the Treaty of Vienna in which Austria ceded Venetia to Italy. After this all of Lake Garda fell within Italian territory except for the northern tip around Riva del Garda, which remained part of Austria. Austria therefore sold its Garda fleet to Italy for one million florins.
