= Invasion of Trentino (1866) =

Military operations during the wars of Italian Unification

The Invasion of Trentino was a series of military operations undertaken by the Kingdom of Italy against the Austrian Empire during the Third Italian War of Independence of 1866, which was part of the larger Austro-Prussian War.

== Background ==
At the outbreak of the Third Italian War of Independence (23 June 1866), Giuseppe Garibaldi received the order to take up positions with his volunteer force, the "Corpo Volontari Italiani", along the frontline between Lombardy and the southernmost part of the County of Tyrol, which today corresponds to the Italian province of Trentino.

Initially, Garibaldi could only muster four battalions, but in the end managed to obtain some 38,000 men, which were to face the roughly 15,000 Austrian regulars under General Baron Franz Kuhn von Kuhnenfeld. The Austrians were supported by their flotilla on Lake Garda.

== First actions ==
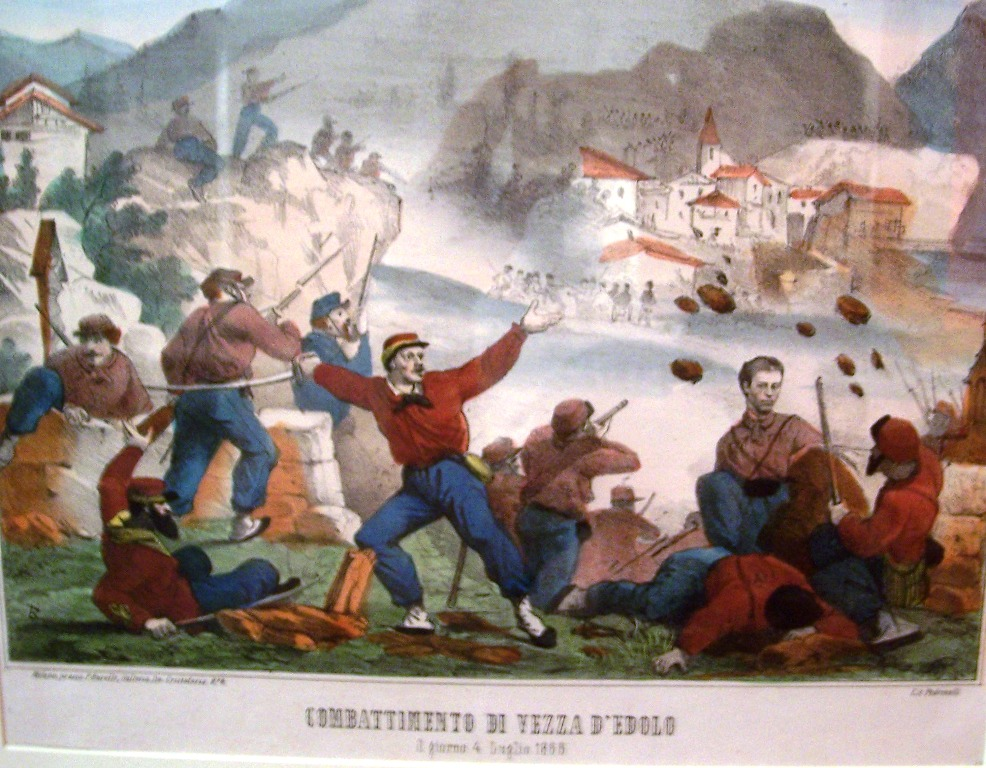
Battle of Vezza

Garibaldi's men started the fights on 21 June 1866. After some initial minor clashes, they were, due to the Italian defeat at the Battle of Custoza, ordered to retreat to the southwestern tip of Lake Garda on 25 June. As the Austrians chose not to pursue them, Garibaldi renewed his advance on 3 July but was wounded during an attack on an enemy mountain position. Nonetheless, the advance of the "Cacciatori" (Hunters) was successful and on 12 July Storo and Condino were occupied.

Contemporarily, actions took place near the Tonale Pass, where 3,000 Austrians had established a defensive line between Vezza d'Oglio and Temù. During the battle of Vezza d'Oglio, on 4 July, the Austrians were dislodged from their positions by an attack of the Italian regular Bersaglieri infantry, which suffered heavy losses. On 2 July an Austrian column crossed the Stelvio Pass and captured Bormio and the Mortirolo Pass, but was later defeated by a force from the Italian National Guard (see Operations in Valtellina).

== Condino ==
Although apparently feeble, the Austrian moves were part of a larger offensive planned by Kuhn which aimed to outflank Garibaldi's positions from Lardaro and Bezzecca. On 16 July an Austrian column ousted the Italians from Cimego. Three columns were now encircling the Italians at Condino, but Garibaldi took advantage of his numerical superiority and the strength of his defensive position and was able to defeat the attack (on 16 July), which forced the Austrians to retreat to their starting positions.

In the following days the Italians marched northwards until, on 20 July, they occupied Bezzecca. As the Austrians had suffered a decisive defeat at the Battle of Sadowa, Kuhn had only a few days left before part of his troops would be sent to augment the defense of Vienna. Profiting from the situation, the Italians began to advance on the southern front too, when a division under Giacomo Medici was sent from Padua to fight its way to the city of Trento.

== Battle of Bezzecca ==
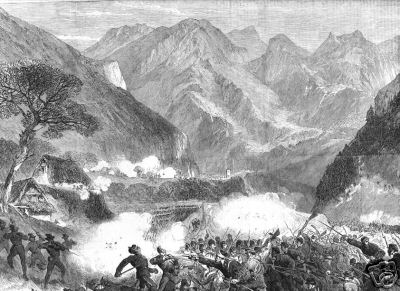
The battle as depicted in The Illustrated London News from 11 August 1866

On 21 July, two Austrian columns clashed with the "Hunters of the Alps" at the Battle of Bezzecca. After some initial Austrian successes, Garibaldi's counterattacks finally forced them to retreat from Bezzecca, as well as from Cimego and Condino.

The Italian commander had now opened the road to Trento, while Medici had successfully swept the Austrian troops from the Valsugana, reaching Civezzano, not far from Trento, on 25 July. Kuhn was preparing to be besieged in Trento, and had received orders to concentrate on the defense of South Tyrol in case of further defeats.

On 25 and 26 July the Italians attacked near Riva del Garda, but were defeated. However, a truce signed on 24 July ended all operations. On 9 August the Italian troops received the order to leave Trentino, as a treaty of peace between Italy and Austria was forthcoming. Garibaldi, from the square of Bezzecca, replied with his famous: "Obbedisco" ("I shall obey"). Hostilities finally ceased with the Armistice of Cormons (12 August 1866).
