= Treaty of Vienna (1866) =

Settlement ending the Third War of Italian Independence

- Type: Peace Treaty
- Signed: 3 October 1866
- Location: Vienna, Archduchy of Austria
- Signatories: Austrian Empire; Kingdom of Italy
- Ratifiers: Austrian Empire; Kingdom of Italy

The 1866 Treaty of Vienna was an agreement signed on 3 October 1866 and ratified on 12 October by the Kingdom of Italy and the Austrian Empire that concluded the hostilities of the Third War of Italian Independence, a theatre of the concurrent Austro-Prussian War.

The treaty confirmed the terms of 12 August Armistice of Cormons, resulting in the transfer of Venetia and most of Friuli to the French Empire, who then gave the region to Italy after the consent of the inhabitants through a referendum. This represented the final division of the Habsburg ruled Kingdom of Lombardy–Venetia, as the Lombard half had already been ceded to the French Empire in the earlier 1859 Treaty of Zurich and then by the French Empire to the Kingdom of Sardinia. The treaty forced the Austrian government to recognise the sovereignty of the new Italian kingdom. This coupled with the Prussian defeat of Austria made apparent the decline of the Habsburg monarchy as a great power. The treaty also signalled the rise of Italy as the sixth great power of Europe.

== Background ==
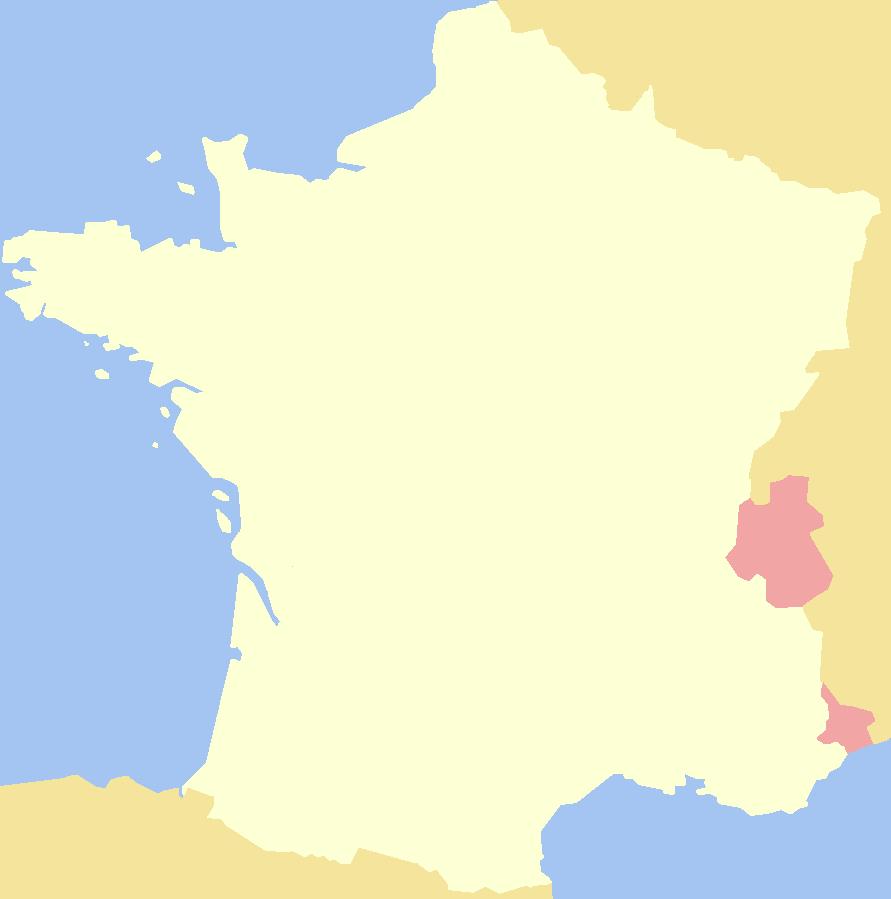
Nice and Savoy in pink, the land given to France by Piedmont within the current French borders.

Since 1848 Italian nationalist societies and the Kingdom of Piedmont-Sardinia had been trying to unify the post-Napoleonic Italian states into a single Italian nation. The main obstacle to Italian Unification was the Habsburg monarchy, which directly or indirectly controlled much of Italy and was actively invested in keeping Italy divided. To overcome Austrian military might Piedmont (then Italy from 1861) would need to rely on foreign intervention by other European nations. To this end the Piedmontese Prime Minister, Camillo Benso, Count of Cavour, forged an alliance with France, agreeing to turn over the French speaking Duchy of Savoy and the County of Nice to France in exchange for military support against Austria. This support would be vital to Italian success in the Second War of Italian Unification, which resulted in the Austrians ceding Lombardy to Piedmont.

In mid-June 1866 war broke out between Austria and Prussia over the administration of Schleswig and Holstein and the future of the German Confederation. Italy took advantage of the situation by siding with Prussia in the conflict, declaring war on Austria on 20 June. The Italian government hoped that the ongoing Austro-Prussian campaign would allow their armies to flank the Austrian forces, seizing Venice, Friuli, Trentino, and Trieste with little difficulty. Austrian forces defeated the Royal Italian Army at the Battle of Custoza and the Italian Navy at Battle of Lissa; however, in the meantime, Giuseppe Garibaldi's volunteers had advanced in the direction of Trento in the invasion of Trentino, winning the Battle of Bezzecca. Later, the Habsburgs were forced to seek an armistice with Italy due to the collapse of their northern armies following the decisive Battle of Sadowa and the rapid Prussian advance into Bohemia and towards Vienna. On 12 August, an armistice was signed by Austria and Italy at Cormons bringing an end to the fighting.

== Provisions of the Treaty ==
The land ceded to France by Austria per the terms of the treaty shown in Dark Blue. Later incorporated into the Kingdom of Italy following a plebiscite.

During the negotiations of the treaty, Austria agreed to surrender the land of the former Venetian Republic (present-day Veneto and Friuli) and the province of Mantua. Italian diplomats also attempted to obtain Trentino as far as Salorno, but this was unsuccessful as the Austrians adhered to the text of the armistice of Cormons, which established the former Kingdom of Lombardy–Venetia as the border between them, thus excluding also the Italian speaking areas of Gorizia and Trieste. Emperor Franz Joseph had already agreed to cede Venetia and Mantua to France, in exchange for non-intervention in the Austro-Prussian War, but France, who was acting as intermediary between Prussia and Austria, ceded them to Italy on 19 October, as agreed in a secret treaty in exchange for the earlier Italian acquiescence to the French annexation of Savoy and Nice. In the peace treaty it was written that the annexation would have become effective only after a plebiscite to let the population express their will about being annexed or not to the Kingdom of Italy; this was held on 21 and 22 October, and the result was overwhelmingly in support of joining Italy. The treaty also forced Italy to pay a cash indemnity for each Austrian fort present in Venetia, as well as requiring them to assume the state debt Venetia had accumulated while under Austrian control. The treaty required Austria to formally acknowledge the existence of the Kingdom of Italy. Austria was also made to give Italy the Iron Crown of Lombardy, the crown used by the medieval Kings of Lombardy and subsequently by the Imperial kings of Italy and Napoleon.

== Consequences of the Treaty ==
For Austria the Treaty of Vienna and the concurrent Treaty of Prague with Prussia were national humiliations, one Austrian general remarked ‘that we [Austria] have sunk to the level of Turkey’. As a result of the twin defeat to both Prussia and Italy the Austrian government incurred a massive state debt, throwing the government into turmoil. With the empire on the brink of collapse the Viennese government was forced to partake in the Austro-Hungarian Compromise of 1867, which forced the Austrian government to grant significant autonomy to the Hungarian portion of the empire. This resulted in the empire being renamed as the Austro-Hungarian Empire and brought about greater equality between Hungarian and German speaking peoples of the empire. With the loss of Venetia Austrian influence on the Italian Peninsula established by the Congress of Vienna was brought to an end. All this combined reinforced the idea that Austria had become a second-rate great power.

The treaty brought the Italian state greater prestige and elevated its diplomatic position in Europe as a great power. However, due to Italy’s poor performance in the war Austria-Hungary was able to retain several strategic mountains passes and mountain peaks in the Alps. This would have serious strategic implications for Italy during the First World War when fighting on the Alpine Front against Austria-Hungary.

== Italian Unification ==
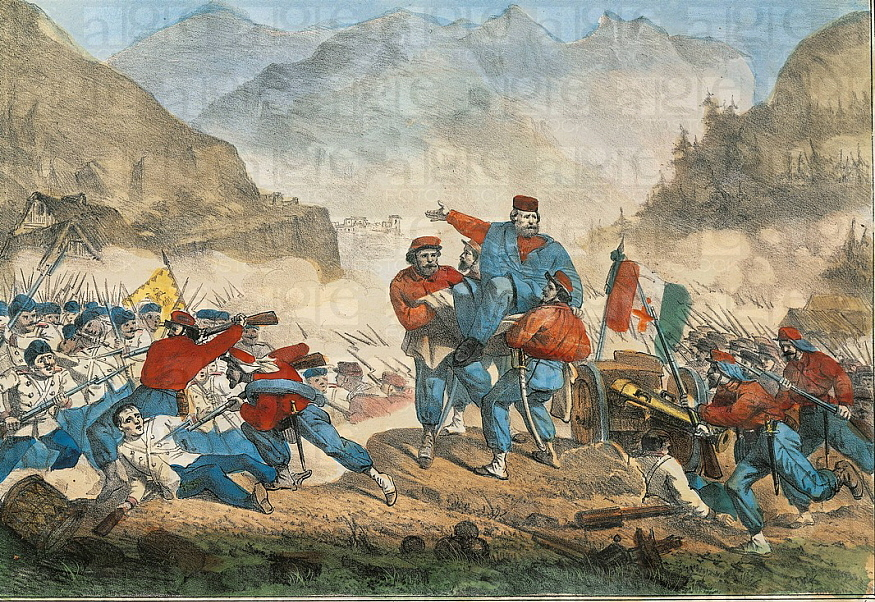
Giuseppe Garibaldi leading Italian soldiers in the Battle of Bezzecca, in modern day Trentino-Alto Adige.

The Treaty of Vienna was a major milestone for the Unification of Italy, bringing Venice and the Veneto into the Italian State. After the war the Italian King, Victor Emmanuel II, proclaimed that ‘Italy was made but not complete’. Although the treaty secured Venetia for Italy, sects of the Italian government and many Italian nationalists, including Garibaldi, did not feel Italy had gained enough territory, with many had hoping the treaty would also gain Trieste and Trentino for Italy, with some going as far lay claim to the South Tyrol, Fiume (Rijeka), and the Dalmatian Coast. This disappointment became the driving force of Italian irredentism in the late nineteenth century. It would be this ongoing desire to claim Trieste and Trentino that would be the main cause for Italy’s entry into the First World War against Austria-Hungary. After the 1919 Paris Peace Settlement Italy’s territorial ambitions would be partially fulfilled with the acquisition of Trentino-South Tyrol, and Trieste, however, it was only under Mussolini that the full goals of 1866 would accomplished when Fascist Italy occupied the Dalmatian coast, an acquisition that was reversed following the end of the Second World War.

== See also ==
- Italian unification
- Third Italian War of Independence
- Austro-Prussian War
- Peace of Prague (1866)
- Austro-Hungarian Compromise of 1867
