= Enrico Guicciardi =

Italian politician (1812–1895)

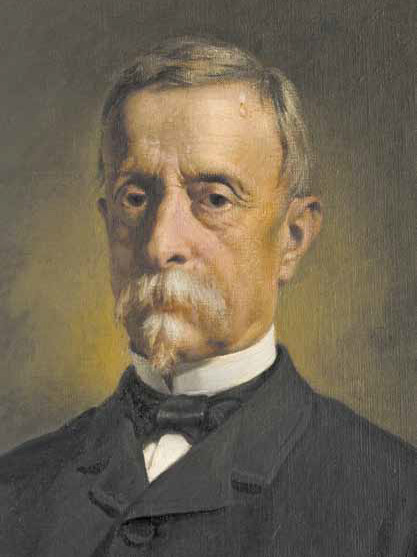

Senator of the Kingdom of Italy
- In office 22 March 1867 – 2 November 1870
- Monarch: Vittorio Emanuele II
- Prime Minister: Giovanni Lanza

Deputy of the Kingdom of Italy
- In office 2 April 1860 – 2 November 1870
- Prime Minister: Alfonso Ferrero La Marmora

Personal details
- Born: November 6, 1812 Ponte in Valtellina, Lombardy–Venetia, Austria
- Died: July 1, 1895 (aged 82) Ponte in Valtellina, Lombardy, Italy

Military service
- Allegiance: Provisional Government of Milan; Sardinia; Italy
- Branch: Royal Sardinian Army; Royal Italian Army
- Years of service: 1848–1870
- Rank: Colonel
- Battles/wars: First Italian War of Independence: Five Days of Milan; Battle of Novara; Third Italian War of Independence: Operations in Valtellina

Enrico Guicciardi (1812-1895) was an Italian colonel and politician during the 19th century. He was known for being a Senator of the Kingdom of Italy during its 10th legislature, a Deputy of the Kingdom of Italy during its 8th, 9th and 10th legislatures and the main colonel at the Operations in Valtellina during the Third Italian War of Independence.

== Family ==
Enrico Guicciardi comes from a family that has been in Ponte in Valtellina since the 12th century and held important offices such as that of Valtellina Talcanzler and others. The family was linked to the most important noble families in the valley through clever marriage policies. Representatives of the family included lawyers, church people and politicians. Enrico was the legitimate son of Diego Guicciardi (1756–1837) and Teresa Guicciardi.

== First Italian War of Independence ==
After graduating at law from the University of Pavia, he was a notary in Sondrio from 1846–1848. He participated in the Risorgimento by sharing Giuseppe Mazzini's ideals for a united Italy. He then participated with his cousin Torelli in the Five Days of Milan. On March 22, 1848, the Municipal Deputation of Ponte in Valtellina decided to form the Civic Guard and gave the command to Enrico Guicciardi who led 150 men to defend the Tonale Pass. With the fall of the Stelvio-Tonale Republic, he fled to Piedmont where he was in command of the Bersaglieri Valtellinesi battalion which distinguished itself in the Battle of Novara and was decorated with a medal for valor. A lover of the mountains and a good mountaineer, in 1853 he became the first Italian to reach the summit of Mont Blanc.

== Political career ==
Meanwhile, the Austrians seized his assets at Ponte in Valtellina and placed a bounty on him. Having freed the commune, in 1859 he was placed at the head of the Province of Sondrio by the Count of Cavour with the task of establishing the new political-administrative systems. After the proclamation of the Kingdom of Italy, he was deputy to the first Italian parliament. He distinguished himself as Prefect of Cosenza from 1862 in the fight against banditry for the proposals that went towards involving citizens in the fight against brigands. It was he who insisted on raising funds for the establishment of an anti-brigandage fund to compensate for the damage caused by the brigands. An Advisor and ally of him was the priest Vincenzo Padula while his firm opponent was the deputy Francesco Martire for several years mayor of Cosenza, deputy and supporter of the Sila Law which recognized ancient agrarian usurpations, but also the civic uses of the presilani and cosentini peasants. He supported prevention, social promotion of populations and dialogue more than military repression. He resigned due to conflicts with the military commander who didn't respect his promise of a saved life in exchange for the surrender of a famous band of brigands. He was then sent as prefect to Palermo, where he had already committed himself against the mafia but then resigned bitterly.

== Third Italian War of Independence ==
In 1866, during the Third Italian War of Independence, with the rank of colonel he commanded the 44th Battalion of the "Mobile National Guard", organizing the defense of the valley at the Sondalo squeeze, repelling the Austrians under Alexander von Metz and Ulysses von Albertini during the Operations in Valtellina. For this, he was decorated with the Military Order of Savoy on December 6, 1866.

== Later years ==
After being a deputy for three legislatures for the colleges of Sondrio and Tirano, in 1868 he was appointed Senator of the Kingdom of Italy. In 1872, he was appointed national president of the Red Cross, in 1873, he promoted the constitution of the Valtellinese section of the CAI. In 1872, he was one of the primary founders behind the Italian Alpine Club. After returning to Ponte in Valtellina, he devoted himself entirely to his administration as from 1873 until his death, he was mayor of the commune. He died in his house at Ponte in Valtellina from a sudden fever on July 1, 1895.

== Awards ==
- Military Order of Savoy, Officer (December 6, 1866)
- Order of Saints Maurice and Lazarus, Knight
- Commemorative Medal of the Unity of Italy (awarded 2 times)
