= Franz Kuhn von Kuhnenfeld =

Austrian general and Minister of War

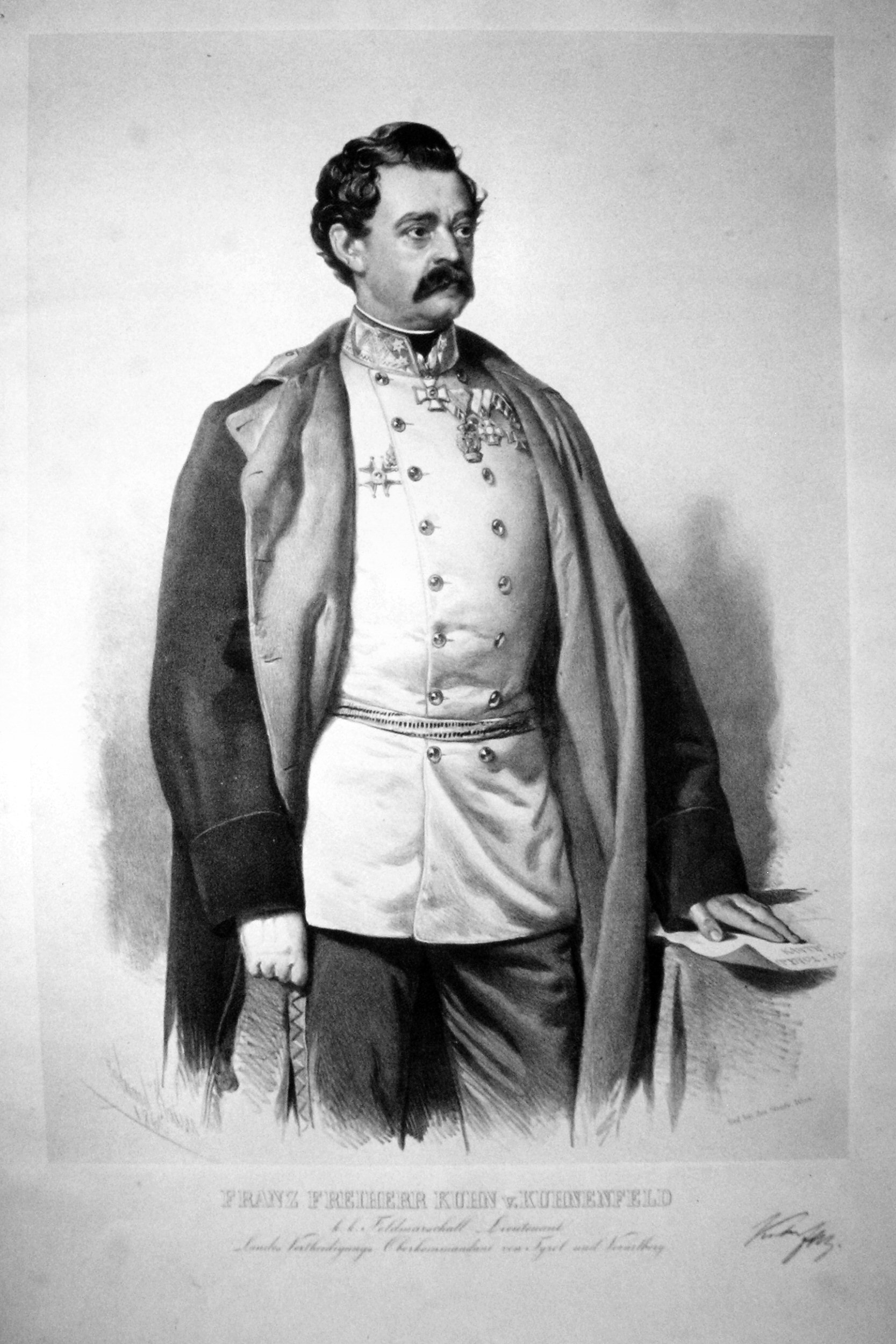
Franz Kuhn von Kuhnenfeld, lithograph by Eduard Kaiser, 1866

Franz Kuhn von Kuhnenfeld (15 July 1817 – 25 May 1896) was an Austro-Hungarian military officer who fought against Giuseppe Garibaldi in the wars of Italian independence and served as Imperial and Royal Minister of War from 1868 to 1874. During his term, a unified system of conscription for both Cisleithania (Austria proper) and Transleithania (Hungary and Croatia) was introduced, corporal punishment in military service was abolished, and the Franz-Josephinian Land Survey was initiated. He was a supporter of the Austro-Hungarian polar expedition and an opponent of the Austria-Hungary's 1879 alliance with the German Empire.

== Life ==
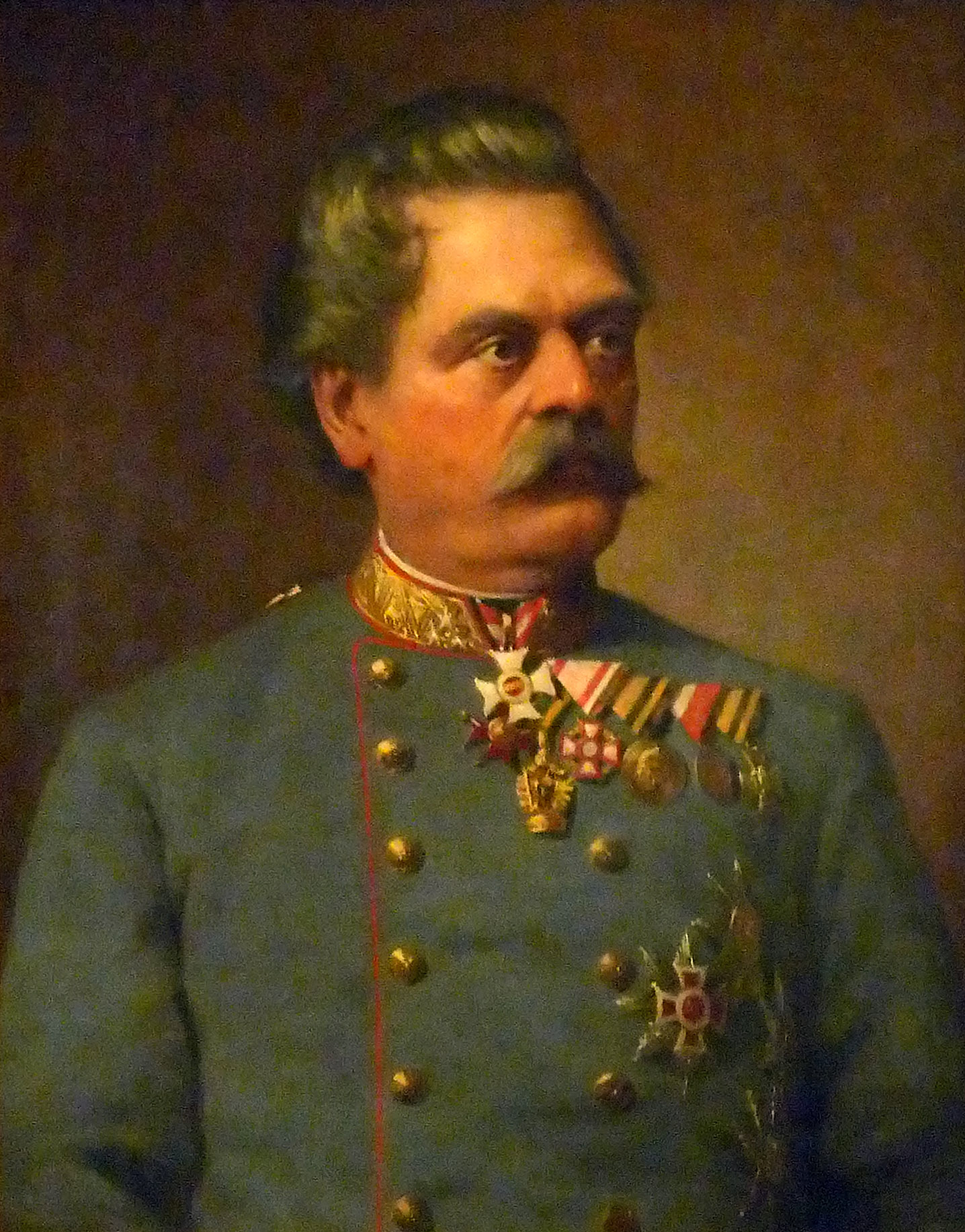
Franz Kuhn von Kuhnenfeld (Portrait by Ludwig Ferdinand Graf, 1890, Museum of Military History, Vienna)

Kuhn was born 15 July 1817 in Proßnitz, Moravia, Austrian Empire (now Prostějov in the Czech Republic), the son of Major Franz von Kuhn (1772–1842), who had been ennobled in 1823, and the farmer's daughter Johanna Schwab (1787–1856). He graduated with distinction from the Theresian Military Academy in Wiener Neustadt and entered military service in 1837. He served on the quartermaster general staff as a Major during the wars of 1848 and 1849 in Italy and Hungary. Subsequently, Kuhn was chief of the general staff of the 11th army corps in Hungary for several years. In 1852 he was granted baronial status and married Rosa von Thuren. He was promoted to Oberstleutnant (lieutenant colonel) in 1853. In 1856, Kuhn became professor of military strategy at the military academy in Vienna. He participated in the Second Italian War of Independence in 1859, as chief of general staff to Field Marshal Ferenc Gyulay, On 29 October 1863, he was promoted to the rank of Major General.

In the Third Italian War of Independence in 1866, General Kuhn was given independent command over the defence of Tirol against the Italians. Facing the volunteers of Giuseppe Garibaldi, more numerous but poorly equipped, he made good use of his forces and of the terrain. He clashed with Garibaldi's forces in skirmishes at Monte Suello (3 July), Vezza (4 July), Spondalunga (11 July), Cimego (16 July), and Monte Notta (18 July). On 21 July, his central force was defeated by Garibaldi at the Battle of Bezzecca and Trento came under immediate threat; he had other skirmishes against the Italian troops under Giacomo Medici at Borgo Valsugana on 23 July and at Vigolo on 25 July. This double invasion put him in great difficulty. The terms of the armistice, however, requested Italian troops to withdraw from Trentino. For his role in the war, he was awarded the Commander's Cross in the Order of Maria Theresa and on 17 August 1866 he was promoted to lieutenant field marshal.

=== Minister of War ===
On 18 January 1868, Emperor Franz Joseph I appointed Kuhn Imperial and Royal Minister of War. He served until 14 June 1874, during which time a set of identical Austrian and Hungarian laws were passed which introduced a unified system of conscription in both parts of Austria-Hungary, and to finally end corporal punishment in the military. On the same day as the new Austrian military law came into force on 5 December 1868, Emperor Franz Joseph I awarded Kuhn the Grand Cross of the Order of Leopold. Over the following years, he began the dissolution of the Military Frontier with the Ottoman Empire. On 23 April 1873, he was promoted to the rank of Field Marshal.

Since Austria-Hungary's military charts had proven inadequate in the Austro-Prussian War, on 8 October 1869 Kuhn asked Emperor Franz Joseph for permission to undertake a new cartographic survey of the whole of Austria-Hungary. The Emperor approved this request only two days later. The new Franzisco-Josephinian Land Survey (also known as the Kuhn Land Survey or the Third Land Survey) was undertaken by Vienna's Institute of Military Geography over the following eighteen years. It was produced on a 1:25,000 scale and was the first land survey of the realm to be based on the metric system. In its published form it consisted of 752 sheets of maps of Austria-Hungary on a 1:75,000 scale, with contour lines. These charts remained in use in some places until the 1960s.

Drawing on his experience of fighting on the Alpine frontier during the Third Italian War of Independence, Kuhn drew up a plan for a radical reorganisation of the defense of the Trentino and South Tyrol, which he entrusted to the k.u.k. Befestigungs – Bau Direktor in Trient Colonel Baron Daniel Salis-Soglio. The campaign had demonstrated to Kuhn the importance of having adequate forces to defend the alpine valleys in Trentino and South Tyrol, especially since the Alpine border was now hundreds of kilometres long, since Italy had gained control of the Veneto region in the war. This led Kuhn to take a special interest in alpine geography and mountaineering and to author a book dealing with alpine warfare.

During his time as a major general in the Tyrol in September 1864, Kuhn noticed a young lieutenant named Julius Payer, who had sketched some maps while on a mountaineering holiday. Payer later claimed that the meeting with Kuhn had been the decisive moment in his life. When Kuhn was appointed Minister of War at the beginning of 1868, he assigned Payer to the Institute of Military Geography, whose director August von Fligely further supported Payer. To produce new maps of Mount Adamello and Ortler, Payer was assigned three Kaiserjäger, 1,000 guilder, and a theodolite.

After Payer had completed this survey work in autumn 1868, Kuhn released him from service in January 1869, to allow him to participate in the Second German North Polar Expedition (1869–1870), led by Carl Koldewey. Kuhn was later also a supporter of the Austro-Hungarian North Pole expedition (1872–1874) led by Payer and Karl Weyprecht, which discovered Franz Josef Land. The historian Günther Hamann identified Kuhn as the key figure in Payer's academic career and the launching of the expedition. As a result of this patronage, Kuhn Island off the eastern coast of Greenland and Kuhn Island in Franz Josef Land were named in his honour.

On 14 July 1874, Kuhn was dismissed by Franz Joseph I from the position of Minister of War and appointed as Commander General of Steiermark, Carinthia, and Carniola.

=== Later life ===
As an Austrian patriot and opponent of Prussia, Kuhn unsuccessfully argued for intervening on the French side in the Franco-Prussian War in 1870. In the 1880s he made no secret of his opposition to the Dual Alliance with the German Empire and advocated an alternative alliance with the French Third Republic and the Russian Empire, by abandoning Austria-Hungary's eastern policy (including the occupation of Bosnia-Herzegovina) and committing to the destruction of Prussia. Kuhn was totally supported in this position by Crown Prince Rudolf. Seven weeks after a discussion of these issues with Rudolf in May 1888, Kuhn was suddenly and unexpectedly sent into retirement, probably because Rudolf had named him as someone who shared his own views.

Kuhn had a daughter, Rosa Kuhn von Kuhnenfeld (22 February 1856 – 30 October 1917), who had married on 24 June 1878, Julius Cäsar von Strassoldo, a nephew of Julius Cäsar von Strassoldo and of Franziska Romana Strassoldo (wife of Joseph Radetzky von Radetz). After his retirement, Kuhn acquired an estate at Strassoldo in Gorizia and Gradisca, near the one which his daughter had inherited from her father-in-law. Kuhn died at this estate of a heart attack, still bitter about his "bleak position", on 25 May 1896.

== Honours and arms ==
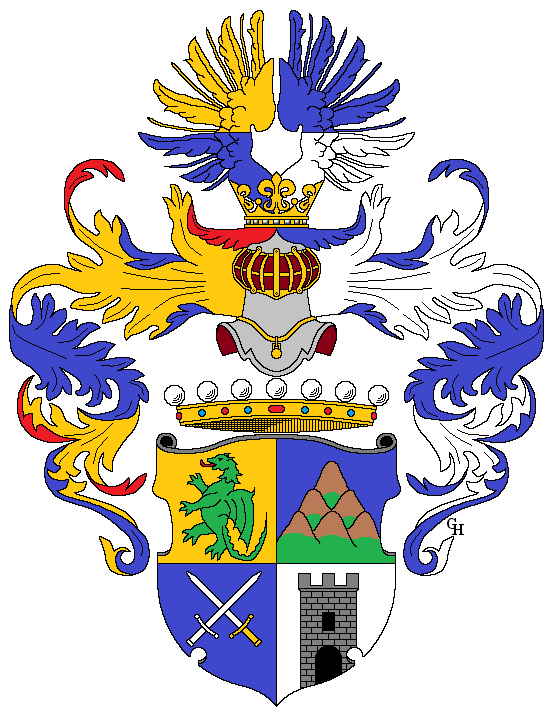
Baronial arms of Kuhn von Kuhnenfeld, granted in 1852.

He received the following orders and decorations:

Austrian awards

- Knight of the Imperial Order of the Iron Crown, 3rd Class with War Decoration, 1848
- Knight of the Military Order of Maria Theresa, 1849; Commander, 1866
- Military Merit Cross, with War Decoration, 1866
- Grand Cross of the Imperial Order of Leopold, 5 December 1868
- Grand Cross of the Royal Hungarian Order of Saint Stephen, 1874

Foreign awards

- Kingdom of Italy: Grand Cross of the Order of Saints Maurice and Lazarus
- Holy See: Commander of the Order of Saint Gregory the Great
- Persian Empire: Imperial Order of the Lion and the Sun, 2nd Class
- Russian Empire: Knight of the Imperial Order of Saint Alexander Nevsky
- Principality of Serbia: Grand Cross of the Order of the Cross of Takovo
- Sweden-Norway: Commander Grand Cross of the Royal Order of the Sword, 15 August 1871

== Bibliography ==
- Constantin von Wurzbach: "Kuhn von Kuhnenfeld, Franz Freiherr." In: Biographisches Lexikon des Kaiserthums Oesterreich (Biographical Lexicon of the Empire of Austria). Part 13 Kaiserlich-königliche Hof- und Staatsdruckerei, Vienna 1865, p. 344–348 (digitalised).
- Franz Ilwof (1906). "Kuhn, Franz Freiherr von Kuhnenfeld" . Allgemeine Deutsche Biographie (in German). Vol. 51. Leipzig: Duncker & Humblot. pp. 422–428.
- Neue Österreichische Biographie ab 1815. Große Österreicher. Band XIII, Amalthea-Verlag, Wien 1959.
- Kiszling: "Kuhn von Kuhnenfeld Franz Frh.". In: Österreichisches Biographisches Lexikon 1815–1950 (ÖBL). Vol. 4, Austrian Academy of Sciences, Vienna 1969, p. 336 f. (Direct links to "p. 336", "p. 337")
- Brigitte Hamann, Kronprinz Rudolf. Ein Leben. Piper, München 2007, ISBN 978-3-492-24572-2, pp. 351–354.
- Walter Wagner (1982). "Kuhn von Kuhnenfeld, Franz Freiherr". Neue Deutsche Biographie (in German). Vol. 13. Berlin: Duncker & Humblot. pp. 269–270. (full text online).
- Walter Wagner, Geschichte des k. k. Kriegsministeriums, II. Band 1866–1888. Böhlau, Wien-Köln-Graz 1971, ISBN 3-205-08579-5, pp. 37–127
- Heinrich von Srbik, Aus Österreichs Vergangenheit. Von Prinz Eugen zu Franz Joseph, Otto Müller, Salzburg 1949, pp. 141–221
