= Battle of Bezzecca =

1866 battle in the Third Italian War of Independence

- Part of the Third Italian War of Independence
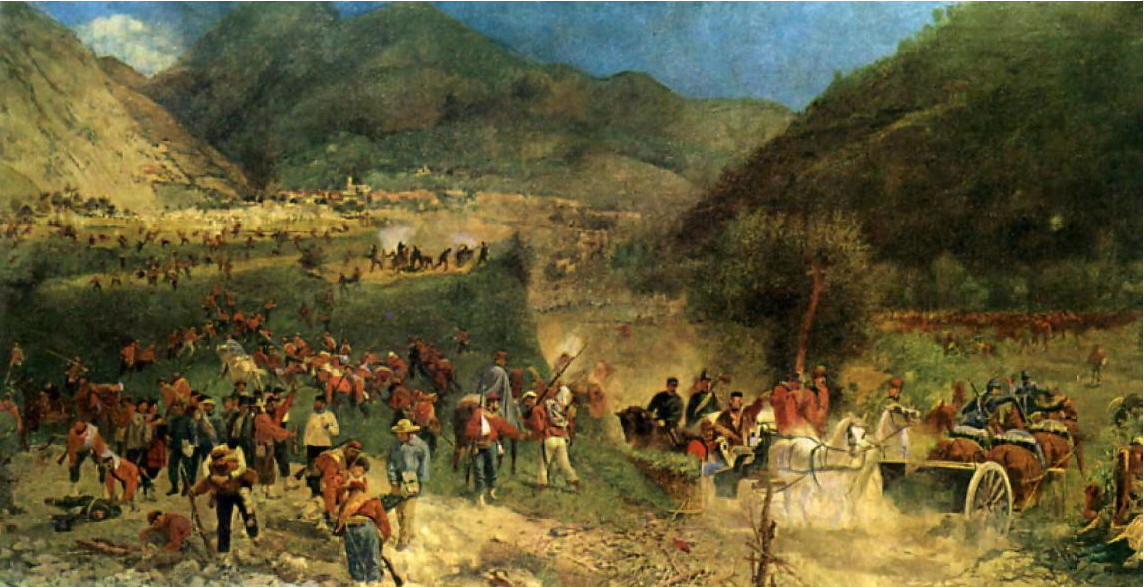
- Battle of Bezzecca
Date	21 July 1866
Location	Bezzecca, Trentino, Princely County of Tyrol
Result	Italian victory

Belligerents
Kingdom of Italy	Austrian Empire

Commanders and leaders
(Kingdom of Italy) Giuseppe Garibaldi	(Austrian Empire) Franz Kuhn von Kuhnenfeld

Strength
c. 12,000	c. 12,000

Casualties and losses
121 killed or missing 451 wounded 1,070 captured	25 killed or missing 82 wounded 100 captured

The Battle of Bezzecca was fought on 21 July 1866 between Italy and Austria during the Third Italian War of Independence. It was a victory of Italian volunteers, the Corpo Truppe Volontarie led by Giuseppe Garibaldi, against Austrian forces and occurred during an Italian invasion of Trentino (began in late June).

The Austrians, commanded by Generalmajor Franz Kuhn von Kuhnenfeld consisted mainly of a mixture of locally-raised battalions and the elite Kaiserjäger light infantry. The Austrians attacked and occupied the city of Bezzecca. The Italians counterattacked to recover the lost town. Garibaldi himself, moving on the battlefield in a coach because of a wound from a previous encounter, was in danger of being captured. The Italian artillery took a hill close to the town, and an assault by the Italian infantry caused the Austrians to withdraw to their emplacements in the surrounding mountains. The volunteers' victory opened the way to Trento for Garibaldi and also for Italian regular troops led by Giacomo Medici, who launched a parallel advance and scored victories at Primolano, Valsugana and Levico.

In the aftermath of the battle the Italian medical services proved inadequate and in contemporary British accounts Mary Chambers is noted to have assisted the wounded by "[tearing] up a portion of her personal apparel to form bandages", purchasing food and drink for them and cleaning their wounds.

On 9 August, Garibald received the message of the armistice between Italy and Austria and the order of general La Marmora, commander-in-chief of the Italian army, to abandon Trentino in order to have a peace agreement that recognized Italy the annexation of Veneto. On that occasion, in the square of Bezzecca, Giuseppe Garibaldi replied with the famous telegram, with only one word: "Obbedisco!" ("I obey!").

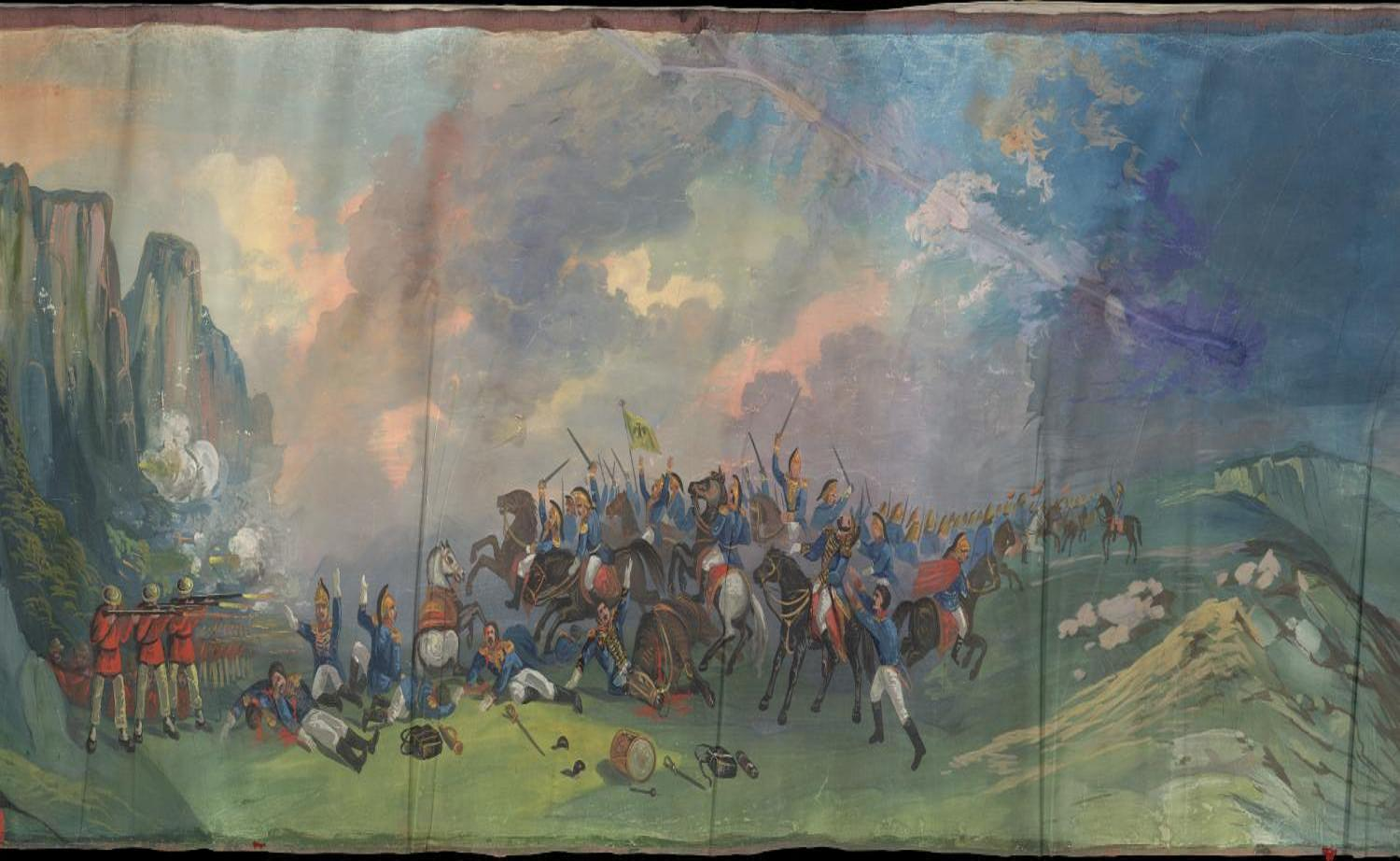
Attack of the Austrians
