= Peace of Prague (1866) =

Peace treaty between Prussia and the Austrian Empire

The Peace of Prague (German: Prager Frieden) was a peace treaty signed by the Kingdom of Prussia and the Austrian Empire at Prague on 23 August 1866. In combination with the treaties of Prussia and several south and central German states, it effectively ended the Austro-Prussian War.

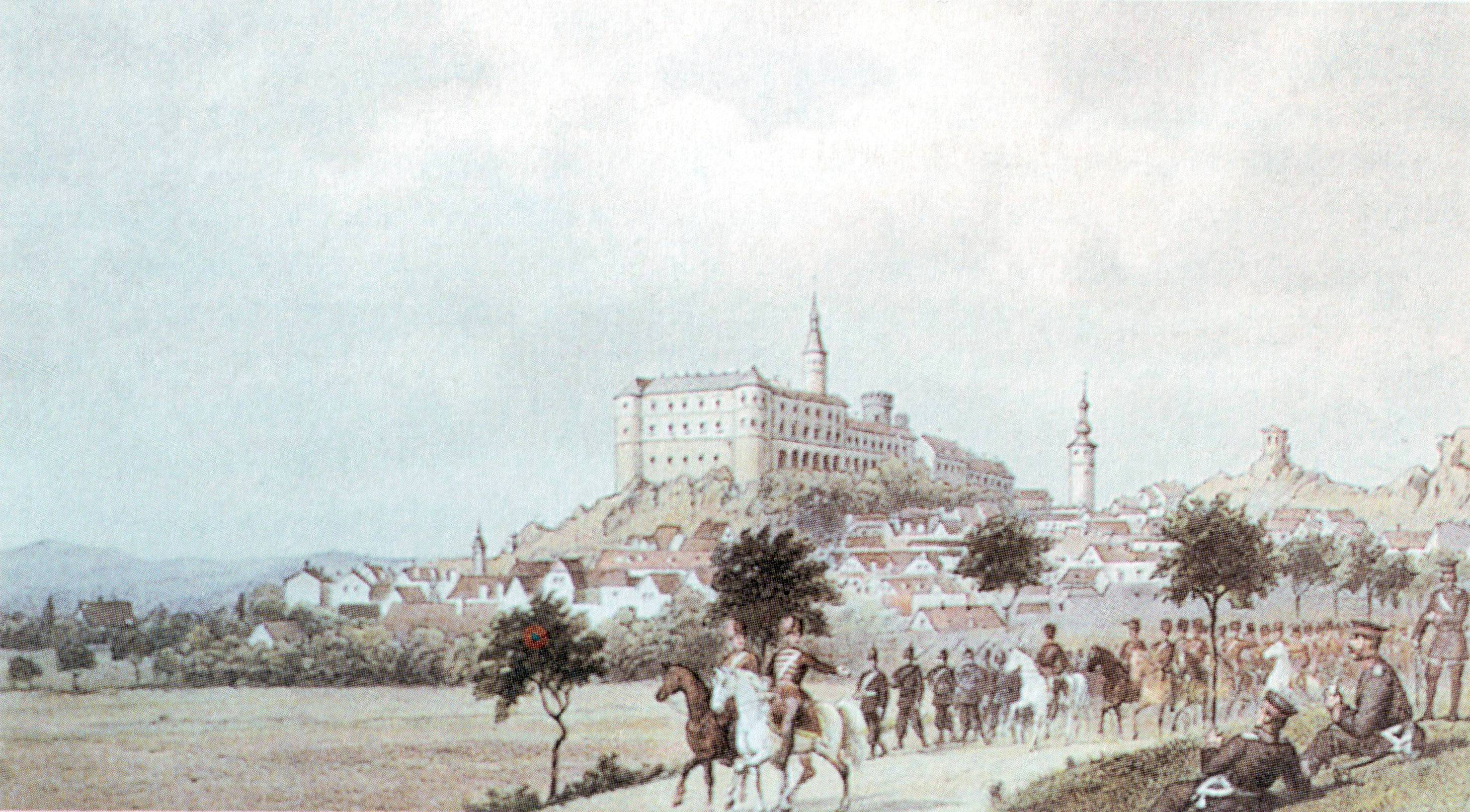
Nikolsburg (now Mikulov in Czechia) where Bismarck threatened to jump out of a window to pressure the Prussian King to end the push toward Vienna (only 70km away).

The treaty was lenient toward the Austrian Empire because Otto von Bismarck had persuaded King Wilhelm I that maintaining Austria's place in Europe would be better for the future of Prussia than harsh terms.

Austria lost Veneto, which had been ceded to Napoleon III of France in the Treaty of Vienna, and he in turn ceded it to Italy. Austria refused to give Venetia directly to Italy because the Austrians believed themselves to have crushed the Italians during the war. The Habsburgs were permanently excluded from German affairs (Kleindeutschland). The Kingdom of Prussia thus established itself as the only major power among the German states. The German Confederation was abolished. Five days prior to the Peace of Prague, the North German Confederation had been formed as a military alliance with an agreement to transform the alliance into a nation state made up of the north German states joined together. The southern German states outside the Confederation were required to pay large indemnities to Prussia.

== See also ==
- Austro-Hungarian Compromise of 1867
