= Third Italian War of Independence =

1866 conflict between the Kingdom of Italy and the Austrian Empire

- Part of the wars of Italian unification and the Austro-Prussian War
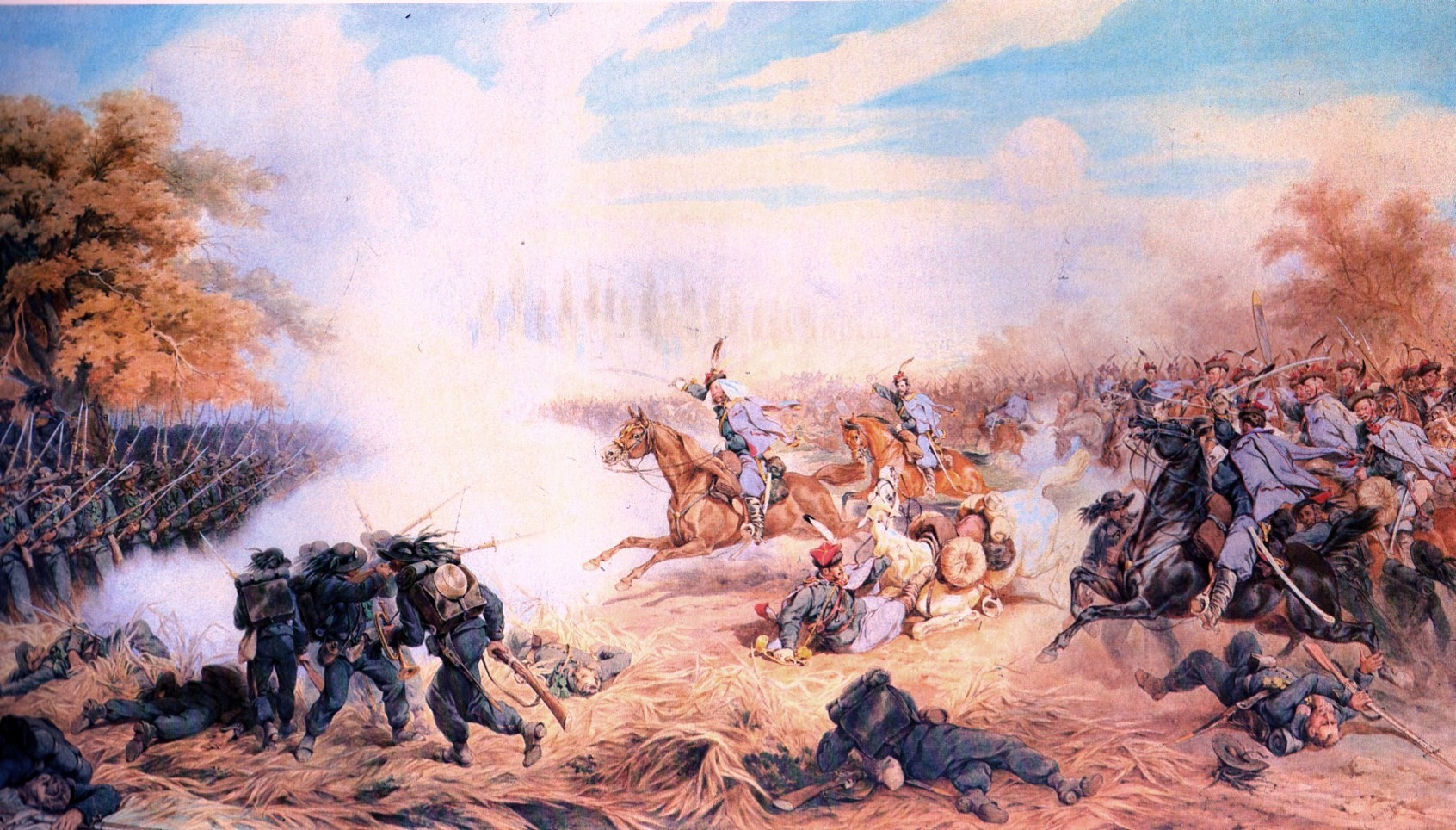
- Austrian Uhlans charge Italian Bersaglieri during the Battle of Custoza. Painting by Juliusz Kossak.
Date	20 June – 12 August 1866 (1 month, 3 weeks and 2 days)
Location	Lombardy–Venetia, Trentino, Adriatic Sea
Result	Italian victory
Territorial changes	Veneto, Friuli, and Mantua annexed by Italy

Belligerents
Kingdom of Italy Prussia	Austrian Empire; Liechtenstein

Commanders and leaders
(Kingdom of Italy) Victor Emmanuel II; (Kingdom of Italy) Giuseppe Garibaldi; (Kingdom of Italy) Alfonso La Marmora	(Austrian Empire) Franz Joseph I; (Austrian Empire) Archduke Albrecht; (Austrian Empire) Wilhelm von Tegetthoff; Johann II

Strength
Mincio Army: 11 infantry divisions; 1 cavalry division; Total: 120,000 men Po Army: 5 infantry divisions; Total: 80,000 men Garibaldi's forces: Volunteer battalions; Total: 20,000 men Total: 220,000 men	South Army: V, VII, IX Corps; 2 cavalry brigades; Liechtenstein Army Total: 80 men Total: 130,000–190,000 men

Casualties and losses
Total: 11,197; 1,633 killed 3,926 wounded 553 missing 5,085 captured	Total: 9,727; 1,392 killed 4,471 wounded 691 missing 3,173 captured

The Third Italian War of Independence (Italian: Terza guerra d'indipendenza italiana) was a war between the Kingdom of Italy and the Austrian Empire fought between June and August 1866. The conflict paralleled the Austro-Prussian War and resulted in Austria giving the region of Venetia (present-day Veneto, Friuli and the city of Mantua, the last remnant of the Quadrilatero) to the Second French Empire (acting as intermediary in negotiations), which formally gave it to Italy. Italy's acquisition of this wealthy and populous territory, annexed with a plebiscite, represented a major step in the Unification of Italy.

== Background ==
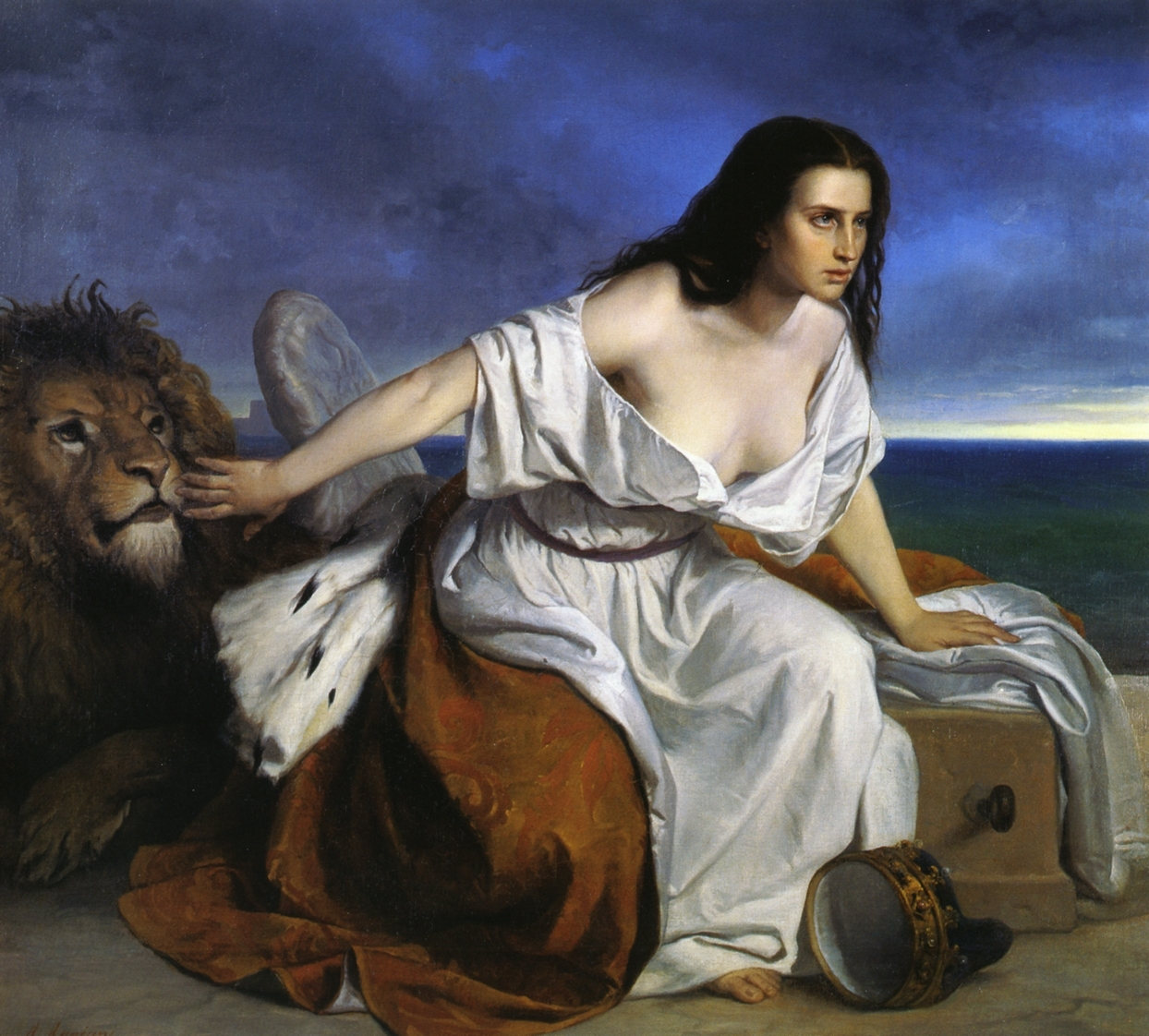
Allegory of Venice, represented by the lion, hoping to join Italy, represented by the woman

Victor Emmanuel II of Savoy had been proclaimed King of Italy on 17 March 1861 but did not control Venetia or the much-reduced Papal States. The situation of the Irredente, a later Italian term for part of the country under foreign domination that literally means unredeemed, was an unceasing source of tension in the domestic politics of the new kingdom and a cornerstone of its foreign policy.

The first attempt to seize Rome was orchestrated by Giuseppe Garibaldi in 1862. Confident in the king's neutrality, he set sail from Genoa to Palermo. Collecting 1,200 volunteers, he sailed from Catania and landed at Melito, Calabria, on 24 August to reach Mount Aspromonte with the intention to travel northward up the peninsula to Rome. The Piedmontese general Enrico Cialdini, however, sent a division under Colonel Pallavicino to stop the volunteer army. Garibaldi was wounded at the Battle of Aspromonte and taken prisoner, along with his men.

The increasing discord between Austria and Prussia over the German Question turned into open war in 1866, which offered Italy an occasion to capture Venetia. On 8 April 1866, the Italian government signed a military alliance with Prussia through the mediation of French Emperor Napoleon III.

Italian armies, led by General Alfonso Ferrero La Marmora, were to engage the Austrians on the southern front. Simultaneously, taking advantage of their perceived naval superiority, the Italians planned to threaten the Dalmatian coast and to seize Trieste.

Upon the outbreak of the war, the Italian military was hampered by several factors:

- The problematic amalgamation of the armies of the Kingdom of Sardinia and the Kingdom of the Two Sicilies, the largest components of the new Kingdom of Italy, involved disputes among the chain of command since former enemies were now serving together.
- The resentment and bitter resistance in Southern Italy followed the annexation of the Kingdom of the Two Sicilies by Italy.
- There was an even stronger rivalry between both navies that had formed the unified Italian navy, the Regia Marina.

== War ==
=== Italian invasion ===
Prussia opened hostilities on 16 June 1866 by attacking several German states allied with Austria. Three days later, Italy declared war on Austria and started military operations on 23 June.

The Italian forces were divided into two armies. One, under La Marmora himself, was deployed in Lombardy, west of the Mincio River, and aimed toward the powerful Quadrilatero fortress of the Austrians. The second, under Enrico Cialdini, was deployed in Romagna, south of the Po River and aimed toward Mantua and Rovigo.

La Marmora moved first through Mantua and Peschiera del Garda but was defeated at the Battle of Custoza on 24 June and retreated in disorder back across the Mincio river. Cialdini, on the other hand, did not act offensively for the first part of the war by conducting only several shows of force.

Following the defeat at Custoza, the Italians reorganised in preparation for a presumed Austrian counter-offensive; the Austrians, however, failed to take advantage of the Italian retreat and limited their actions to raids on Valtellina and Val Camonica (battle of Vezza d'Oglio).

=== New Italian offensive ===
The naval Battle of Lissa, 20 July 1866

The course of the war turned to Italy's favour by Prussian victories in Bohemia, especially the decisive Battle of Königgrätz (or Sadowa) on 3 July. The Austrians were compelled to redeploy one of their three army corps from Italy to Vienna. The remaining Austrian forces in the theatre concentrated their defences around Trentino and Isonzo.

On 5 July, the Italian government received news of a mediation effort by Napoleon III for a settlement of the situation, which would allow Austria to receive favorable conditions from Prussia and, in particular, maintain Venice. The situation was embarrassing for Italy, as its forces had been beaten back in the only battle to date. As the Austrians were redeploying more and more troops to Vienna to defend it against the Prussians, La Marmora was urged to take advantage of his force's numerical superiority, score a victory and improve the situation for Italy at the bargaining table.

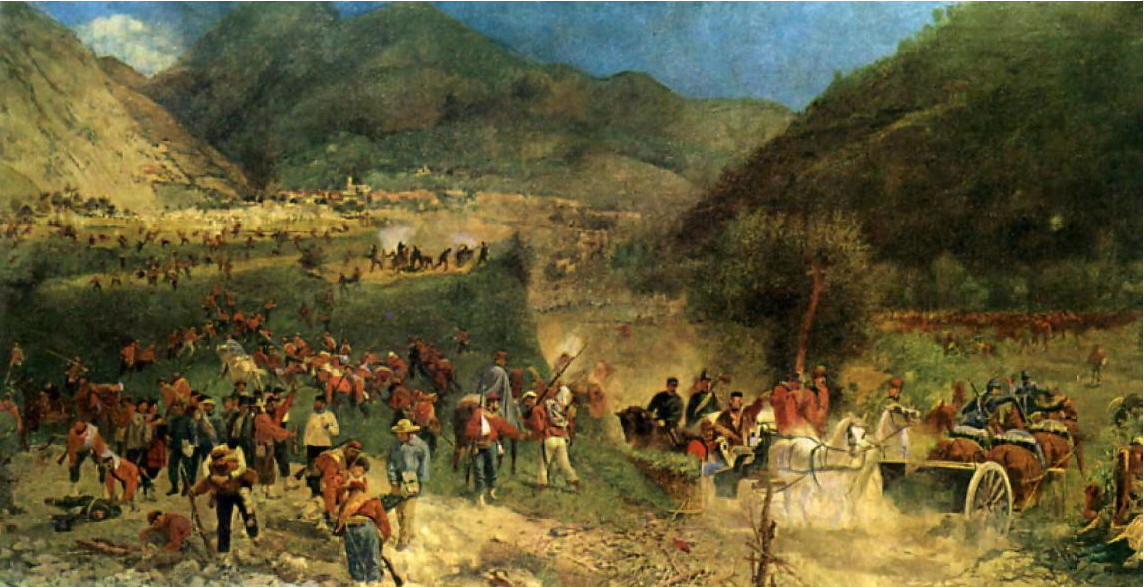
Battle of Bezzecca, 21 July 1866

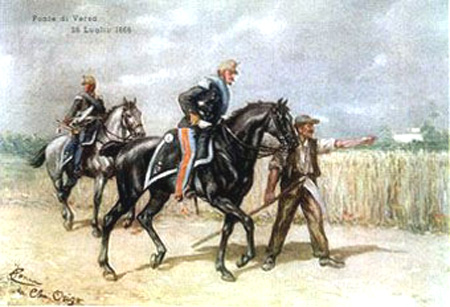
Battle of Versa, 26 July 1866

On 14 July, during a council of war held in Ferrara, the new Italian war plans were decided:

- Cialdini was to lead the main army of 150,000 troops through the Venetia, and La Marmora, with roughly 70,000 men, would tie down Austrian forces in the Quadrilatero.
- The Italian Navy, commanded by Admiral Carlo di Persano was to set sail from Ancona and confront the Austrian fleet in the Adriatic.
- Garibaldi's volunteer corps (named Cacciatori delle Alpi), eventually reinforced by forces of the regular infantry, were to advance into the region of Trentino.

Cialdini crossed the Po on 8 July and, after a part of his forces captured Borgoforte in a siege, advanced to Udine on 22 July without encountering the Austrian Army. This advance was overshadowed by the victory of the Austrian navy commanded by admiral Wilhelm von Tegetthoff against the Italian fleet at the Battle of Lissa on 20 July, where two Italian ships were sunk. In the meantime, however, Garibaldi's volunteers had advanced from Brescia toward Trento during the Invasion of Trentino, winning clashes at Monte Suello, Forte d'Ampola, Condino, and winning the battle of Bezzecca on 21 July. At the same time a force led by Giacomo Medici also advanced in Trentino, obtaining successes at Primolano, Borgo Valsugana and Levico.

On 26 July, a mixed Italian force of bersaglieri and cavalry defeated an Austrian force guarding the crossing of the Torre River and reached what is now Romans d'Isonzo at the Battle of Versa. That marked the maximum Italian advance into Friuli. However, with the cessation of Austro-Prussian hostilities, the Austrians seemed ready to send reinforcements to Italy. Likewise, the Principality of Liechtenstein being the southern ally of Austria had sent out its army into the region west of Stilfser Joch against the volunteers. Garibaldi and Medici were nonetheless able to continue their advance on Trento. Austria agreed to cede Veneto via French intermediation to Italy and, on 9 August, Garibaldi was ordered in a telegraph by the Army High Command to evacuate Trentino to confirm the peace deal. His reply was simply "Obbedisco" ("I shall obey") and became famous in Italy soon after.

== Aftermath ==
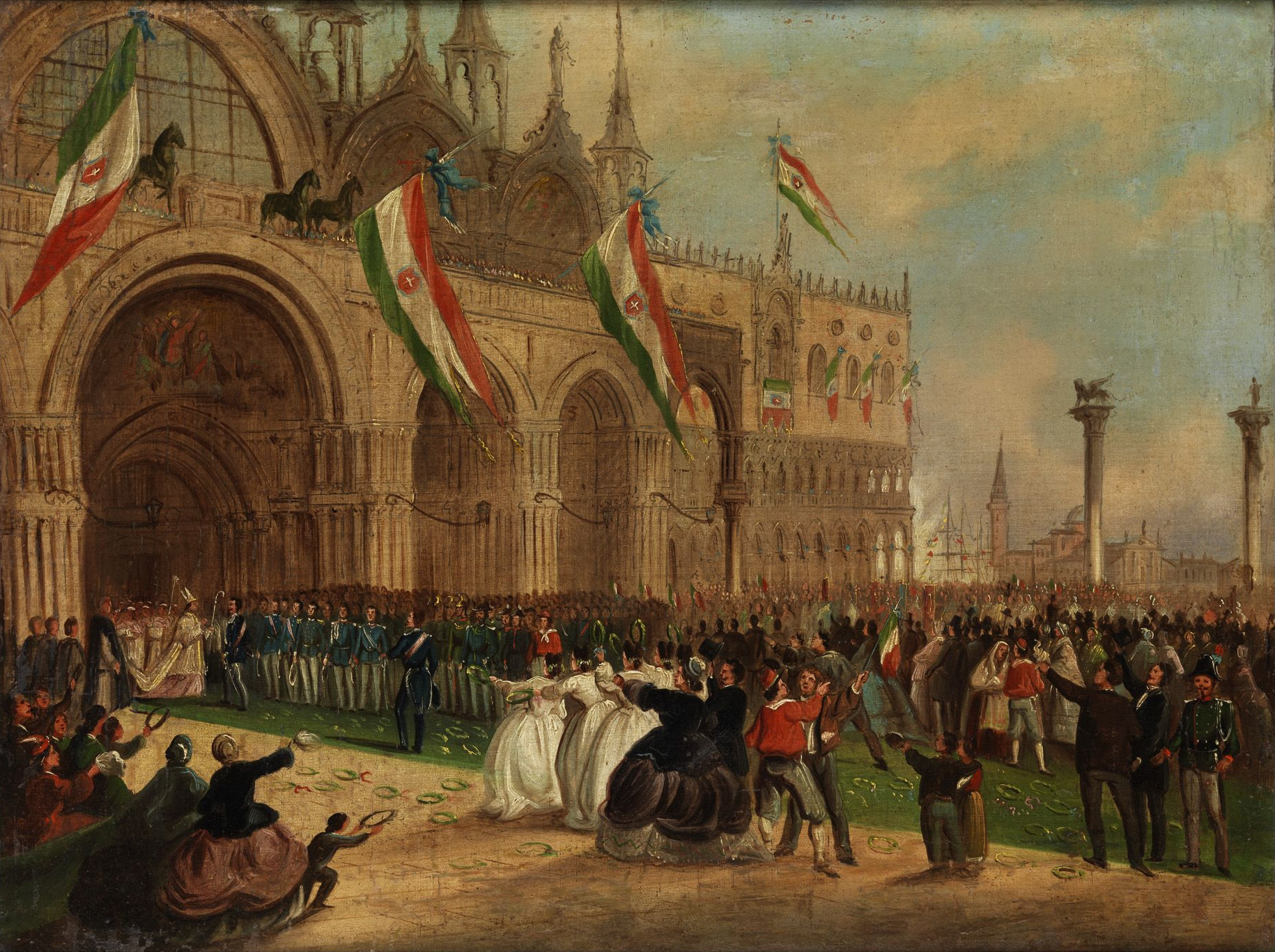
Victor Emmanuel II in Venice

In late July 1866, after the Prussian victory over Austria, the Armistice of Nikolsburg ended the hostilities between the two countries, provided that Italy obtained Venetia. The Italian army had advanced to the Isonzo River, the Austrians withdrew and left Venice to Italian hands. Following the Austro-Prussian armistice, France and Prussia pressured Italy to conclude an armistice on its own with Austria. The Italian Prime Minister Bettino Ricasoli initially refused the call and insisted to obtain "natural" frontiers for Italy, including the cession of Venetia and South Tyrol and that Italian interests in Istria were respected. Eventually, the cessation of hostilities between Italy and Austria was agreed to at the Armistice of Cormons signed on 12 August, followed by the Treaty of Vienna on 3 October 1866.

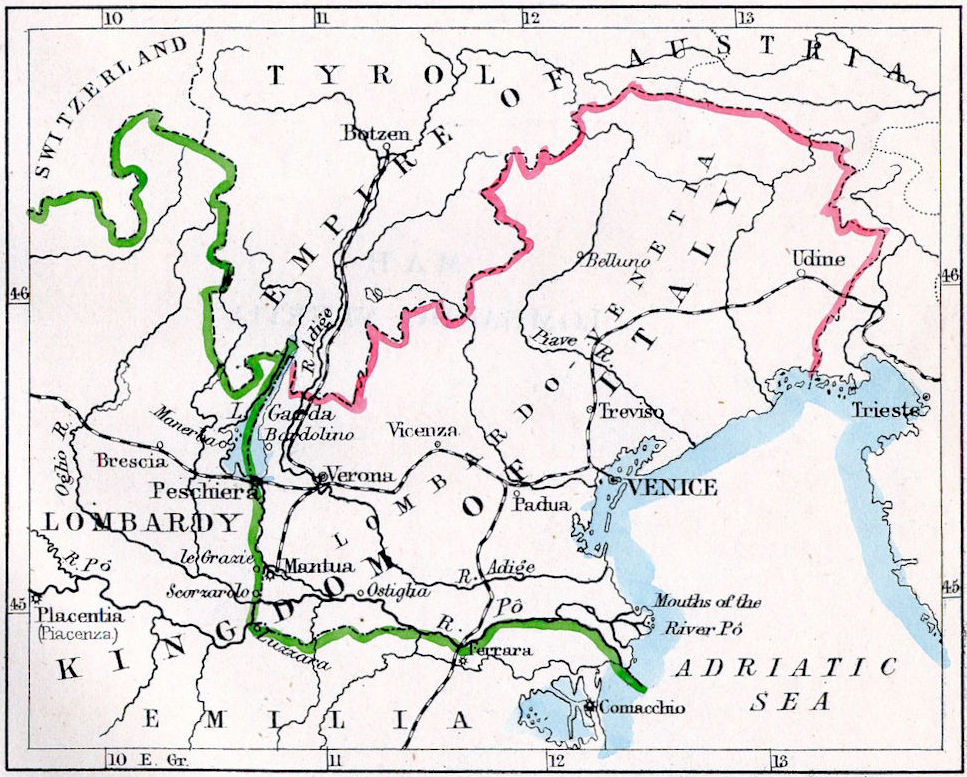
Boundary under the 1859 Treaty
Boundary under the 1866 Treaty

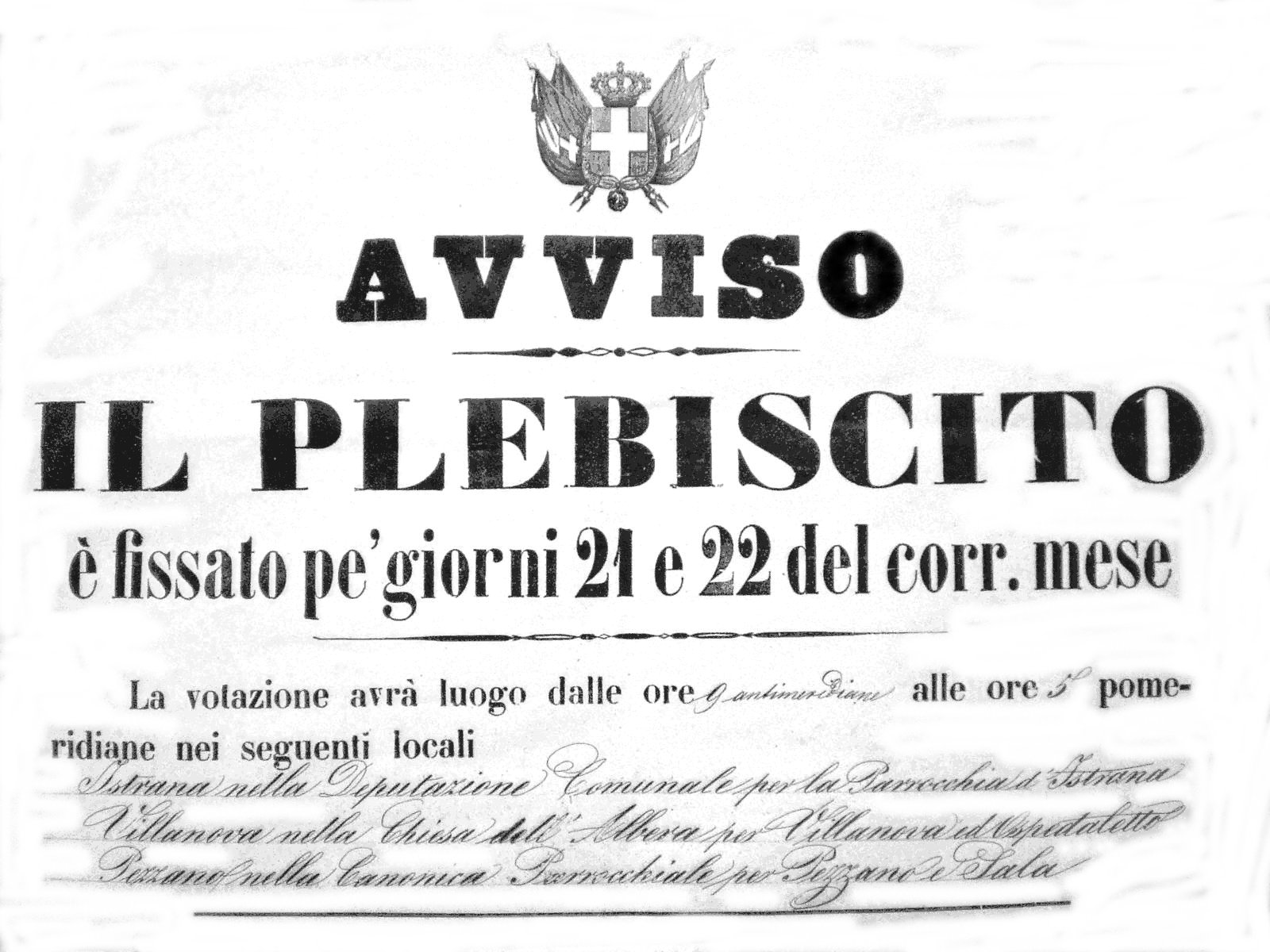
Notice for the 21–22 October 1866 plebiscite of Venetian provinces and Mantua

The terms of the Peace of Prague included the giving of the Iron Crown of Lombardy to the Italian king and the Austrian cession of Venetia, consisting of modern Veneto, parts of Friuli and the city of Mantua. Napoleon III, who was acting as intermediary between Prussia and Austria, ceded Venetia to Italy on 19 October, as had been agreed in a secret treaty in exchange for the earlier Italian acquiescence to the French annexation of Savoy and Nice.

The Treaty of Vienna confirmed the cession of the territory to Italy. However, the peace treaty stated that the annexation of Venetia and Mantua would have become effective only after a plebiscite allowed the population to express its will on its annexation to the Kingdom of Italy. The plebiscite was held on 21 and 22 October, and the result was an overwhelming success, with 99.9% of participants in support of joining Italy.

Meanwhile, an uprising also occurred in Sicily, the Seven and a Half Days Revolt. The unification of Italy was completed by the Capture of Rome (1870) and the annexation of Trentino, the remainder of Friuli and Trieste at the end of World War I, also called in Italy the Fourth Italian War of Independence.

== See also ==
- First Italian War of Independence
- Second Italian War of Independence
- Austro-Prussian War
- Armistice of Cormons
- Garibaldi's Expedition against Rome
- Risorgimento
- Naval operations on Lake Garda, 1866

== Bibliography ==
- Clodfelter, M. (2017). Warfare and Armed Conflicts: A Statistical Encyclopedia of Casualty and Other Figures, 1492-2015 (4th ed.). Jefferson, North Carolina: McFarland. ISBN 978-0786474707.
