= Treaty of Zürich =

1859 treaty between Austria, France, and Sardinia

The Treaty of Zurich was signed by the Austrian Empire, the French Empire, and the Kingdom of Sardinia on 10 November 1859. The agreement was a reaffirmation of the terms of the preliminary peace of Villafranca, which brought the Austro-Sardinian War to an official close. The treaty actually consisted of three separate treaties – a treaty between France and Austria, which reaffirmed the terms of the preliminary peace, re-established peace between the two emperors, and ceded Lombardy to France. A second treaty, between France and Sardinia, saw France cede Lombardy to Sardinia. The third treaty, signed by all three powers, re-established a state of peace between Austria and Sardinia.

In the French-Austrian treaty, both countries agreed to work towards a confederation of Italian states, including Venice, under the honorary presidency of the Pope (art. 18), which never happened.

== See also ==
- Armistice of Villafranca
- Treaty of Turin (1860)
- Treaty of Vienna (1866)
- Second Italian War of Independence
