= Helion =

Helion may refer to:

== People and characters ==
- Helion (magister officiorum) (5th century)
- Hélion de Villeneuve (c. 1270 – 1346), medieval knight
- Jean Hélion (1904–1987), French painter
- Helion, character in John C. Wright's trilogy The Golden Age

== Groups, companies, organizations ==
- Helion Energy, an American company pursuing fusion power
- Helion Lodge
- Helion (publisher), a Polish publisher.

== Other uses ==
- Helion (chemistry), helium nucleus
- Helion (meteoroid), meteoroids that seemingly originate from the Sun

== See also ==
- Heliyon
- Hellion (disambiguation)
- Helium (disambiguation)
- Helon (disambiguation)
- Hel (disambiguation)
