= Austro-Prussian War =

1866 war in Europe

- Part of the wars of German unification and the Austria–Prussia rivalry
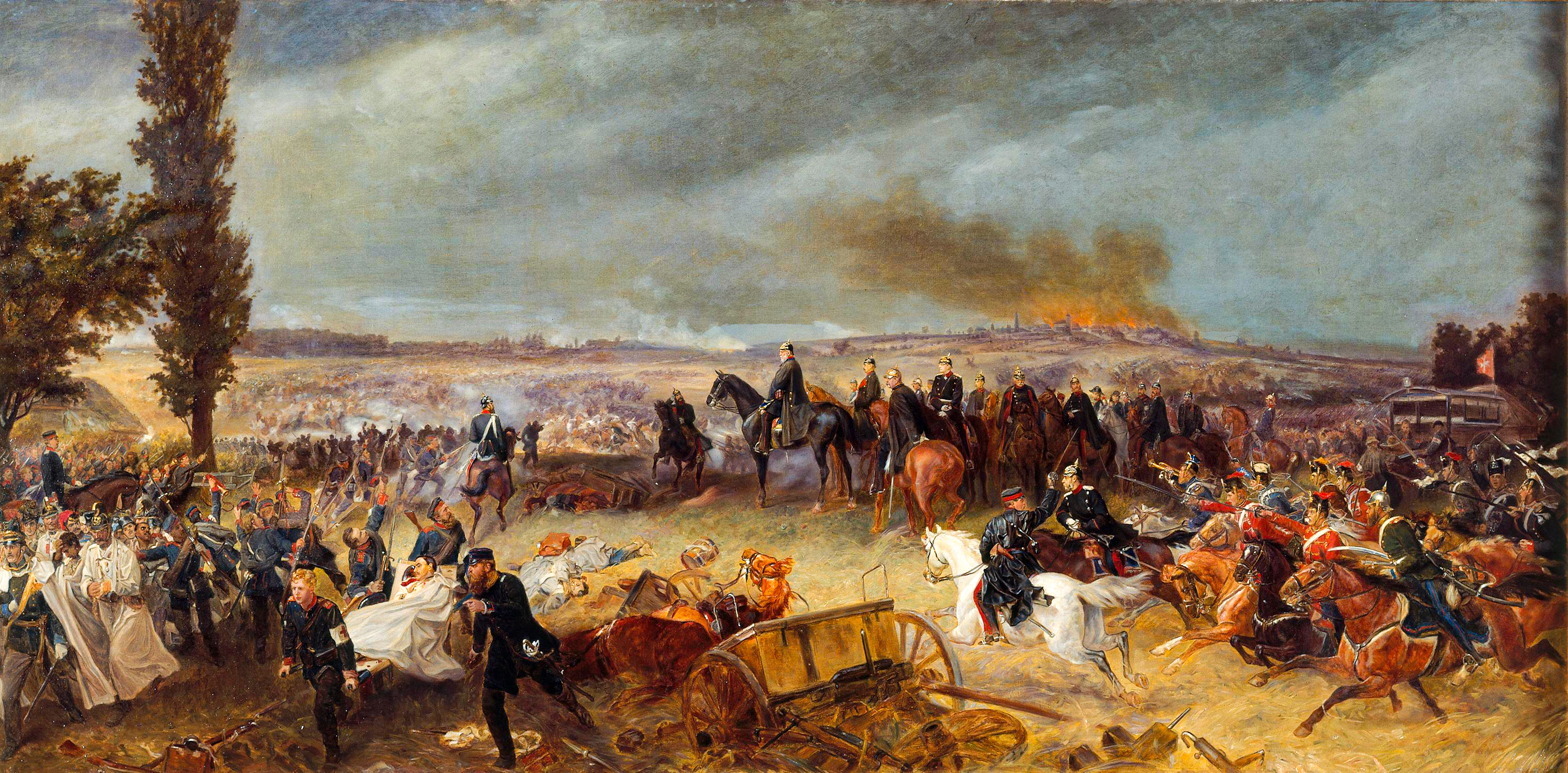
- Battle of Königgrätz by Georg Bleibtreu. Oil on canvas, 1869.
Date	14 June – 22 July 1866 (1 month and 8 days)
Location	German Confederation (South and Central Germany, Bohemia and Moravia), Kingdom of Hungary, Northern Italy, Adriatic Sea
Result	Italo-Prussian victory: Dissolution of the German Confederation; Formation of the North German Confederation; Exclusion of Austria from German national politics; Formation of Austria-Hungary
Territorial changes	Prussia annexes Hanover, Holstein, Schleswig, Hesse-Kassel, Nassau, Frankfurt and fringe possessions of Bavaria and Hesse-Darmstadt; Italy completely annexes Venetia and a part of Friuli

Belligerents
(Kingdom of Prussia) Prussia; Saxe-Lauenburg; Mecklenburg-Schwerin; (Duchy of Brunswick) Brunswick; Saxe-Coburg & Gotha; Saxe-Altenburg; Mecklenburg-Strelitz; Oldenburg; Anhalt; Schwarzburg; Waldeck; Lippe; Lübeck; Bremen; Hamburg; (Kingdom of Italy) Italy	German Confederation: Austria; Bavaria; Saxony; Hanover; Württemberg; Hesse-Kassel; Baden; Hesse-Darmstadt; Nassau; Saxe-Meiningen; Reuss-Greiz; Schaumburg-Lippe; Frankfurt; Liechtenstein

Commanders and leaders
(Kingdom of Prussia) Wilhelm I; (Kingdom of Prussia) Otto von Bismarck; (Kingdom of Prussia) Helmuth von Moltke; (Kingdom of Prussia) Albrecht von Roon; (Kingdom of Italy) Victor Emmanuel II; (Kingdom of Italy) Alfonso La Marmora; (Kingdom of Italy) Giuseppe Garibaldi	(Austrian Empire) Franz Joseph I; (Austrian Empire) Albrecht von Teschen; (Austrian Empire) Ludwig von Benedek; (Austrian Empire) Wilhelm von Tegetthoff; (Kingdom of Bavaria) Ludwig II; (Kingdom of Bavaria) Prince Karl Theodor; (Kingdom of Saxony) Crown Prince Albert

Strength
637,262: Prussia 437,262; Italy 200,000	522,203: Austria 407,223; Bavaria 38,000; Saxony 26,500; Hesse-Darmstadt 20,000; Hanover 18,400; Württemberg 7,000; Baden 5,000; Liechtenstein 80

Casualties and losses
List: Prussia: 40,000; 11,765 battle deaths; c. 7,000 disease deaths; c. 25,000 wounded; c. 1,100 missing; 910 captured; Italy: 11,197; 2,314 battle deaths; c. 4,500 wounded; 553 missing; c. 5,000 captured	List: Austria: 106,796; 24,431 battle deaths; 19,134 disease deaths; c. 40,000 wounded; 12,365 missing; c. 40,000 captured; Hanover: c. 25,000; 3,456 battle deaths; c. 5,500 wounded; 16,263 captured or missing; Bavaria: c. 20,000; 5,500 battle deaths; c. 1,200 wounded; 1,397 captured or missing; Saxony: 7,000; 1,341 battle deaths; 4,678 wounded; 580 captured or missing; Hesse: 3,500; 767 battle deaths; 2,321 wounded; 546 captured or missing; Württemberg: 2,300; 452 battle deaths; 1,679 wounded; 198 captured or missing; Baden: 500; 112 battle deaths; c. 300 wounded; 57 captured or missing; Liechtenstein; no casualties (rumors of 1 additional soldier joining the army)

The Austro-Prussian War (Note: Also known as the Seven Weeks' War, the German Civil War, the Brothers War, and the Fraternal War; known in German as Deutscher Krieg ("German War"), Deutsch-Deutscher Krieg ("German-German War") or Deutscher Bruderkrieg (pronounced [ˌdɔʏtʃɐ ˈbʁuːdɐkʁiːk]; "German Brothers War")) (German: Preußisch-Österreichischer Krieg) was fought in 1866 between the Austrian Empire and the Kingdom of Prussia, with each also being aided by various allies within the German Confederation. Prussia had also allied with the Kingdom of Italy, linking this conflict to the Third Independence War of Italian unification. The Austro-Prussian War was part of the wider rivalry between Austria and Prussia, and resulted in Prussian dominance over the German states, having confirmed Prussia's superiority in military organization and technology over Austria at the time.

The major result of the war was a shift in power among the German states away from Austrian and towards Prussian hegemony. It resulted in the abolition of the German Confederation and its partial replacement by the unification of all of the northern German states in the North German Confederation that excluded Austria and the other southern German states, a Kleindeutsches Reich. The war also resulted in the Italian annexations of the Austrian realm of Venetia.

== Outbreak of war ==
The war erupted as a result of the dispute between Prussia and Austria over the administration of Schleswig-Holstein, which the two of them had conquered from Denmark and agreed to jointly occupy at the end of the Second Schleswig War in 1864. The crisis started on 26 January 1866, when Prussia protested the decision of the Austrian Governor of Holstein to permit the estates of the duchies to call up a united assembly, declaring the Austrian decision a breach of the principle of joint sovereignty. Austria replied on 7 February, asserting that its decision did not infringe on Prussia's rights in the duchies. In March 1866, Austria reinforced its troops along its frontier with Prussia. The Kingdom responded with a partial mobilization of five divisions on 28 March.

The Prussian Minister President Otto von Bismarck made an alliance with Italy on 8 April, committing it to the war if Prussia entered one against Austria within three months, which was an obvious incentive for him to go to war with Austria within three months so that Italy would divert Austrian strength away from Prussia. Vienna responded with a mobilization of the Southern Army on the Italian border on 21 April. Italy called for a general mobilization on 26 April and Austria ordered its own one the next day. Prussia's general mobilization orders were signed in steps on 3, 5, 7, 8, 10 and 12 May.

When Austria brought the Schleswig-Holstein dispute before the German Diet on 1 June and also decided on 5 June to convene the Diet of Holstein on 11 June, Prussia declared that the Gastein Convention of 14 August 1865 had thereby been nullified and invaded Holstein on 9 June. When the German Diet circumvented the creation of a national parliament proposed by the Kingdom and responded by voting for a partial mobilization against Prussia on 14 June, Bismarck claimed that the German Confederation had ended. The Prussian Army invaded Hanover, Saxony and the Electorate of Hesse on 15 June. Italy declared war on Austria on 20 June.

== Causes ==
For several centuries, Central Europe was split into a few large- or medium-sized states and hundreds of tiny entities, which while ostensibly being within the Holy Roman Empire ruled by the Holy Roman Emperor, operated in a largely independent fashion. When an existing Emperor died, seven secular and ecclesiastical prince-electors, each of whom ruled at least one of the states, would elect a new Emperor. Over time the Empire became smaller and by 1789 came to consist of primarily German peoples (aside from Bohemia, Moravia, the southern Netherlands and Slovenia). Aside from five years (1740–1745), the Habsburg family, whose domain was Austria, controlled the Emperorship from 1440 to 1806, although it became increasingly ceremonial only as Austria found itself at war at certain times with other states within the Empire, such as Prussia, which in fact defeated Austria during the War of Austrian Succession to seize the province of Silesia in 1742.

While Austria was traditionally considered the leader of the German states, Prussia became increasingly powerful and by the late 18th century was ranked as one of the great powers of Europe. Francis II's abolition of the office of Holy Roman Emperor in 1806 also deprived him of his imperial authority over most of German-speaking Europe, though little true authority remained by that time; he did, however, retain firm control of an extensive multi-ethnic empire (most of it outside the previous boundaries of the Holy Roman Empire). After 1815, the German states were once again reorganized into a loose confederation: the German Confederation, under Austrian leadership. Prussia had been contesting Austria's supremacy in Germany since at least 1850, when a war between the two powers had nearly erupted over Berlin's leadership of the Erfurt Union, though at that time Prussia had backed down.

=== Nationalism ===
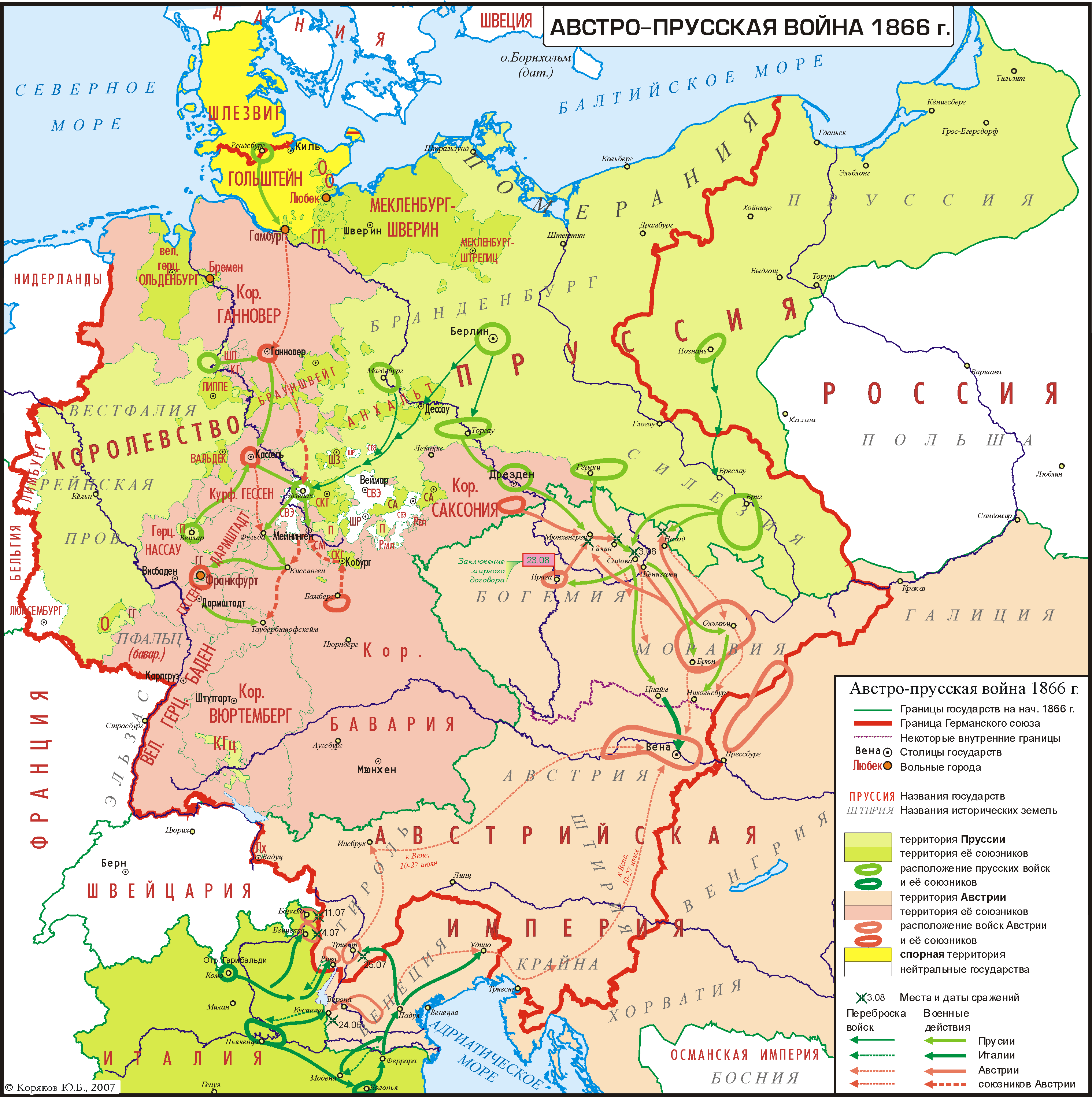
Map depicting deployment and advance of Austrian (red) and Prussian (green) troops and their allies (in Russian)

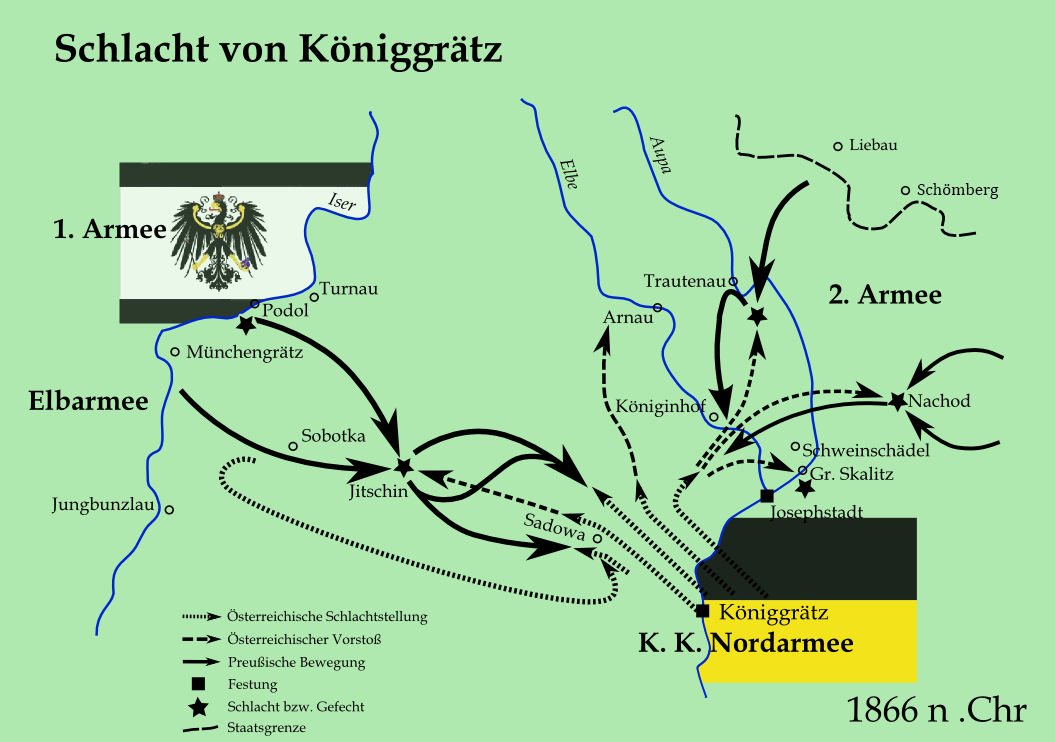
Depiction of Prussian and Austrian troop movements and maneuvers during the Battle of Königgrätz (in German)

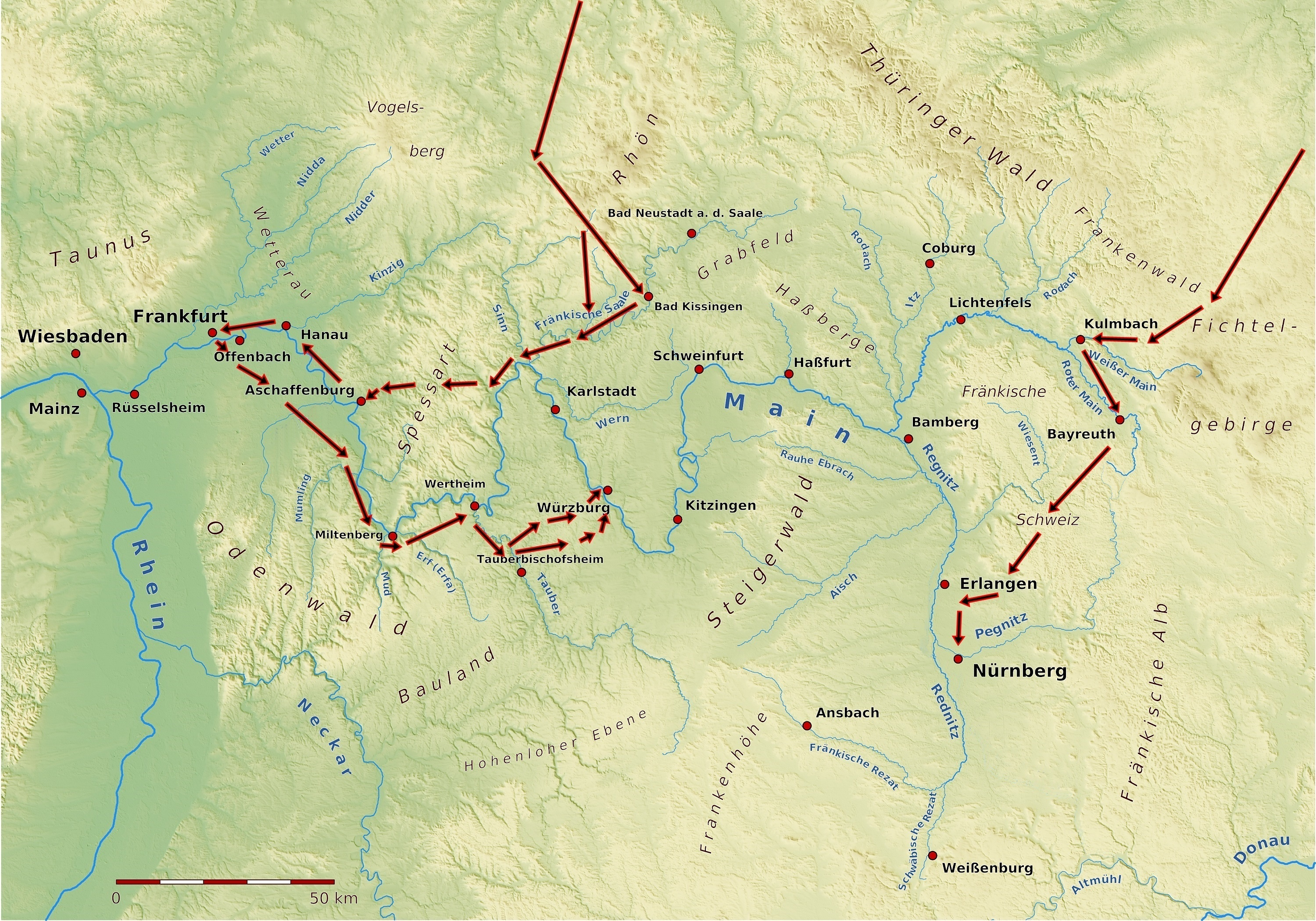
Movements of the Prussian Army near the Main river (in German)

At the time of the war, there was no strong national consciousness in Germany. Michael Hughes notes that in regards to Germany, "nationalism was a minority movement, deeply divided and with only a marginal impact on German political life". German newspapers were almost exclusively concerned with local affairs or their respective state governments, and the individual German states cultivated loyalty towards themselves. While rivalry with France was an important element of German nationalist myth-making, many Germans cooperated with France during the Napoleonic Era, and those who resisted France did not do so out of nationalist sentiment. According to John Breuilly, any sense of a common German identity "was weakly developed and confined to particular groups" and "there was very little demand, certainly at popular level, for unification". The liberal-nationalist concept of a united Germany had also become unpopular following the fall of the Frankfurt Parliament in 1849. One of the strongest social forces in Germany at the time was religion, which provided Germans with common confessional values and identities that transcended national boundaries. This led to a strong confessional rivalry between the southern Catholic and northern Protestant states. Breuilly remarks that the confessional rivalry was so strong that "a Hamburg Lutheran had more in common with a Swedish Lutheran than with an Austrian Catholic". The minor nations of Germany valued their independence and believed that their ability to remain sovereign depended on Austro-Prussian dualism, with neither side allowed to become too powerful. Confessional division also played an important role in German dualism, and there was a strong pressure in Catholic states to support Austria. In the absence of nationalist sentiment, a united German state could only be created through external force. Bismarck recognised this, remarking in 1862 that a united German state could not be forged through "speeches and majority decisions" but only through "blood and iron".

=== Bismarck's plot ===
There are many interpretations of Otto von Bismarck's behaviour before the Austrian-Prussian war. Bismarck himself maintained that he orchestrated the conflict in order to bring about the North German Confederation, the Franco-Prussian War and the eventual unification of Germany.

On 22 February 1866, Count Károlyi, Austrian ambassador in Berlin, sent a dispatch to the Minister of Foreign Affairs, Count Alexander Mensdorff-Pouilly. He explained to him that Prussian public opinion had become extremely sensitive about the Duchies issue and that he had no doubt that "this artificial exaggeration of the danger by public opinion formed an essential part of the calculations and actions of Count Bismarck [who considered] the annexation of the Duchies ... a matter of life and death for his political existence [and wished] to make it appear such for Prussia too."

Possible evidence can be found in Bismarck's orchestration of the Austrian alliance during the Second Schleswig War against Denmark, which can be seen as his diplomatic "masterstroke". Taylor also believes that the alliance was a "test for Austria rather than a trap" and that the goal was not war with Austria, contradicting what Bismarck later gave in his memoirs as his main reason for establishing the alliance. It was in the Prussian interest to gain an alliance with Austria to defeat Denmark and settle the issue of the duchies of Schleswig and Holstein. The alliance can be regarded as an aid to Prussian expansion, rather than a provocation of war against Austria. Many historians believe that Bismarck was simply a Prussian expansionist, rather than a German nationalist, who sought the unification of Germany. It was at the Gastein Convention that the Austrian alliance was set up to lure Austria into war.

Italy gave a good chance to Bismarck as it wanted to annex the remainder of Emperor Francis Joseph's Kingdom of Lombardy-Venetia. The timing of the Italo-Prussian Alliance of 8 April 1866 was perfect, because all other European powers were either bound by relations that forbade them from entering the conflict opposed to Berlin, or had domestic problems that had priority. Obvious reasons why none of the great powers of Europe was about to intervene are listed below:

Russia: Saint Petersburg was unlikely to enter on the side of Vienna, due to ill will over Francis Joseph's support for the Anglo-French alliance during the Crimean War despite the house of Romanov's aid to him against the Hungarian Revolution and War of Independence of 1848–1849. Moreover, Prussia had stood by Russia during the January Uprising in Poland, signing the Alvensleben Convention of February 1863 with the Empire, whereas Austria had not.

France: Paris was also unlikely to enter on the side of Austria, because Bismarck had visited Emperor Napoleon III in Biarritz and they allegedly discussed whether or not France would intervene in a potential Austro-Prussian war. The details of the negotiation are unknown but many historians think Bismarck was guaranteed French neutrality in the event of a war.

Britain: London focused on its own affairs in splendid isolation and had no stake economically or politically in a war between the Central European powers, thus, was not going to intervene.

This meant that Austria would be fighting both Italy and Prussia, without any non-German allies of its own. Bismarck was aware of an available numerical superiority but still "he was not prepared to advise it immediately even though he gave a favourable account of the international situation".

=== Military factors ===
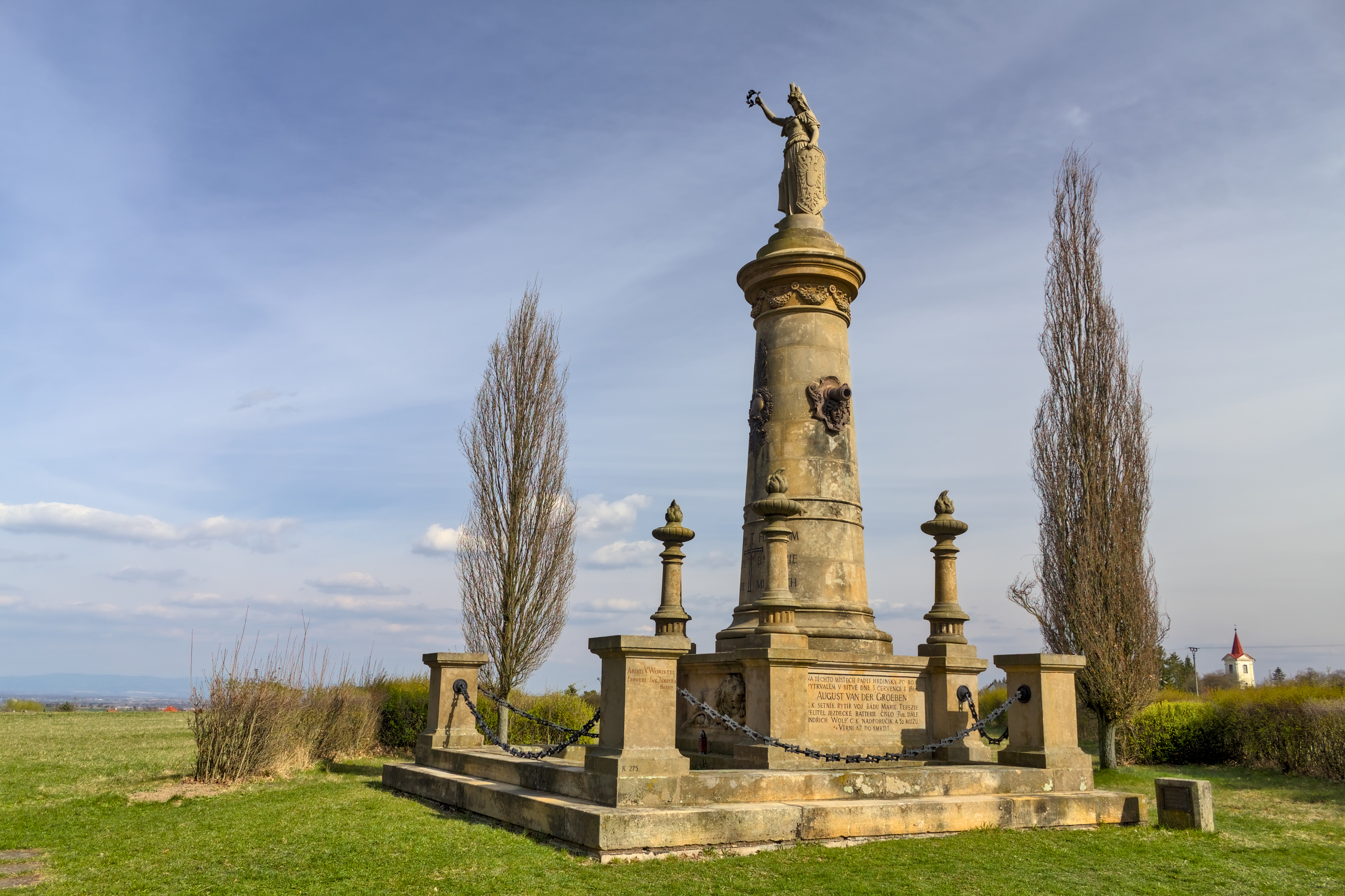
The memorial to the Battery of the dead in Chlum (modern Czech Republic) commemorates some of the heaviest fighting during the Battle of Königgrätz.

Bismarck may well have been encouraged to go to war by the advantages of the Prussian army against the Austrian Empire. Taylor wrote that Bismarck was reluctant to pursue war as it "deprived him of control and left the decisions to the generals whose ability he distrusted". (The two most important personalities within the Prussian army were the War Minister Albrecht Graf von Roon and Chief of the General Staff Helmuth Graf von Moltke). Taylor suggested that Bismarck was hoping to force Austrian leaders into concessions in Germany, rather than provoke war. The truth may be more complicated than simply that Bismarck, who famously said that "politics is the art of the possible", initially sought war with Austria or was initially against the idea of going to war with Austria.

==== Rival military systems ====
In 1862, von Roon had implemented several army reforms that ensured that all Prussian citizens were liable to conscription. Before this date, the size of the army had been fixed by earlier laws that had not taken population growth into account, making conscription inequitable and unpopular for this reason. While some Prussian men remained in the army or the reserves until they were forty years old, about one man in three (or even more in some regions where the population had expanded greatly as a result of industrialisation) was assigned minimal service in the Landwehr, the home guard.

Introducing universal conscription for three years increased the size of the active duty army and provided Prussia with a reserve army equal in size to that which Moltke deployed against Austria. Had France under Napoleon III attempted to intervene against the Prussians, they could have faced him with equal or superior numbers of troops.

Prussian conscript service was one of continuous training and drill, in contrast to the Austrian army where some commanders routinely dismissed infantry conscripts to their homes on permanent leave soon after their induction into the army, retaining only a cadre of long-term soldiers for formal parades and routine duties. Austrian conscripts had to be trained almost from scratch when they were recalled to their units on the outbreak of war. The Prussian army was thus better trained and disciplined than their enemy's one, particularly in the infantry. While the Habsburg Empire's cavalry and artillery were as well trained as their Prussian counterparts, with Austria possessing two elite divisions of heavy cavalry, weapons and tactics had advanced since the Napoleonic Wars and cavalry charges had been rendered obsolete.

==== Speed of mobilization ====
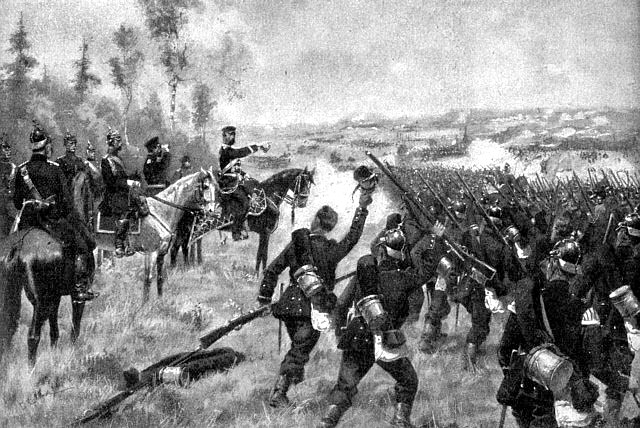
Prussian Prince Friedrich Karl is cheered on by his troops.

The Prussian army was locally based, organized in Kreise (military districts, lit.: circles), each containing a Korps headquarters and its component units. Most reservists lived close to their regimental depots and could be swiftly mobilized. Austrian policy was to ensure that units were stationed far from home to prevent them from taking part in separatist revolts. Conscripts on leave or reservists recalled to their units during mobilization faced a journey that might take weeks before they could report to their units, making the Austrian mobilization much slower than that of the Prussian Army.

==== Speed of concentration ====
The railway system of Prussia was more extensively developed than that within Austria. Railways made it possible to supply larger numbers of troops than hitherto and allowed the rapid movement of troops within friendly territory. The more efficient Prussian rail network allowed the Prussian army to concentrate more rapidly than their enemy. Moltke, reviewing his plans to Roon stated, "We have the inestimable advantage of being able to carry our Field Army of 285,000 men over five railway lines and of virtually concentrating them in twenty-five days. ... Austria has only one railway line and it will take her forty-five days to assemble 200,000 men." Moltke had also said earlier, "Nothing could be more welcome to us than to have now the war that we must have."

The Austrian army under Ludwig von Benedek in Bohemia (the present-day Czech Republic) might previously have been expected to enjoy the advantage of the "central position", by being able to concentrate on successive attacking armies strung out along the frontier, but the quicker Prussian concentration nullified this advantage. By the time the Austrians were fully assembled, they would be unable to concentrate against one Prussian army without having the other two instantly attack their flank and rear, threatening their lines of communication.

==== Armaments and tactics ====
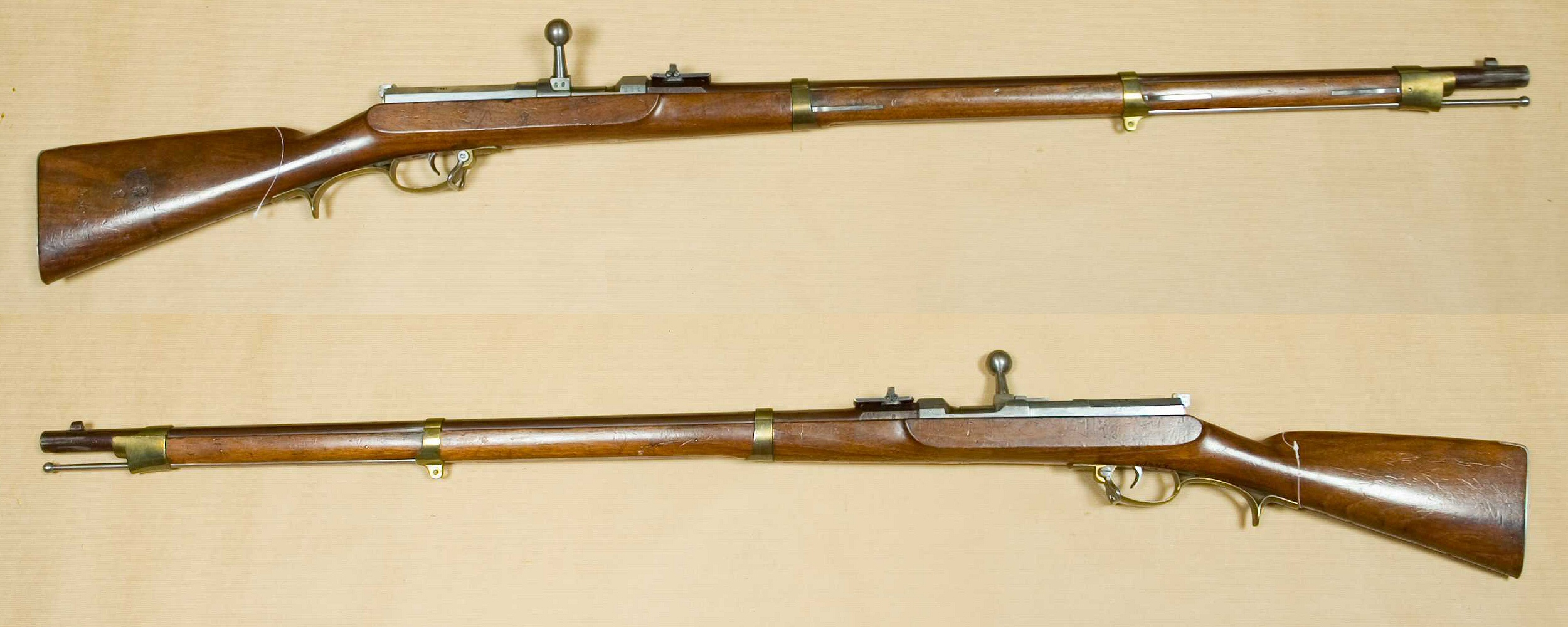
The Prussian Dreyse needle gun

Prussian infantry were equipped with the Dreyse needle gun, a bolt-action rifle which could be fired faster than the muzzle-loading Lorenz rifles of the Austrian army. In the Franco-Austrian War of 1859, French troops took advantage of poorly trained enemies who did not readjust their gunsights as they got closer – thus firing too high at close range. By rapidly closing the range, French troops came to close quarters with an advantage over the enemy's infantry. After the war, the Austrians adopted the same methods, which they termed the Stoßtaktik ("shock tactics"). Although they had some warnings of the Prussian weapon, they ignored these and retained Stoßtaktik.

The Austrians were equipped with breech-loading rifled cannon, which was superior to the Prussian muzzle loading smooth bore cannon. Their artillery used a unique rifling system invented by Wilhelm Lenk von Wolfsberg called the Lenk system. The Prussians, however, by this point had replaced up to 60% of their smooth bore artillery with the technologically superior C64 (field gun), which had been in production since 1859. However, due to tactical reluctance on the part of Prussian high command to utilise relatively unfamiliar technology, and doctrinal stagnation in the Artillery Corps, the modern Krupp guns were either sent to reserve units or used in tandem and to the same effect as their smooth bore counterparts, something that massively throttled their effectiveness in the war, and many of the guns that saw combat were the old smooth bore muzzle loaders. The Austrians too, while having standardised the Lenk system of rifling in their cannon, did not use their artillery to full effect. They specifically targeted the Prussian artillery with their own batteries, limiting their impact on the battlefield in regards to Prussian infantry. One notable exception is the use of Austrian artillery to good effect against infantry at Battle of Königgrätz.

The generals of the Prussian army realized that, in order to stay ahead of their Austrian and later French enemies, they needed to explore new military tactics. They sent officers to travel across the Atlantic Ocean to go and observe the American Civil War. These officers met with high ranking commanders and recorded both Union and Confederate tactics. They wrote about troop movements, artillery positioning, and new methods of attack that worked well for the Americans. These officers then travelled back to Prussia and briefed their generals about these observations. Some officers, such as Justus Scheibert, published their adventures in America for the public to enjoy.

=== Economic factors ===
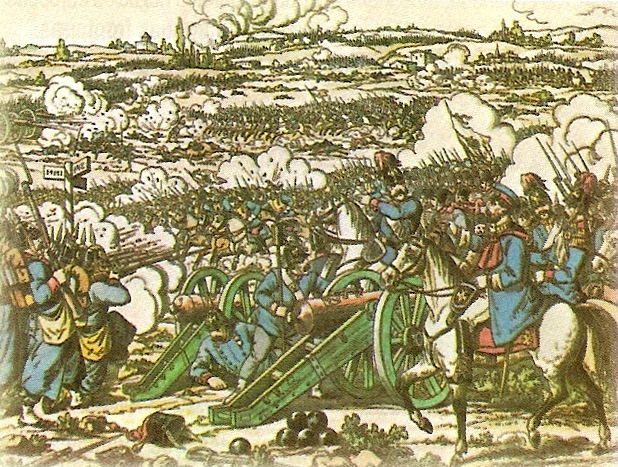
The Battle of Königgrätz

In 1866, the Prussian economy was rapidly growing, partly as a result of the German customs union, the Zollverein, which gave Prussia an advantage in the war. Prussia could equip its armies with breech-loading rifles and later with new Krupp breech-loading artillery but the Austrian economy was suffering from the effects of the Hungarian Revolution of 1848 and the Second Italian War of Independence, so the state was heavily in debt. Historian Christopher Clark wrote that there is little to suggest that Prussia had an overwhelming economic and industrial advantage over Austria and wrote that a larger portion of the Prussian population was engaged in agriculture than in the Austrian population and that Austrian industry could produce the most sophisticated weapons in the war (rifled artillery). The Austro-Prussian War ended quickly and was fought mainly with existing weapons and munitions, which reduced the influence of economic and industrial power relative to politics and military culture.

== Alliances ==
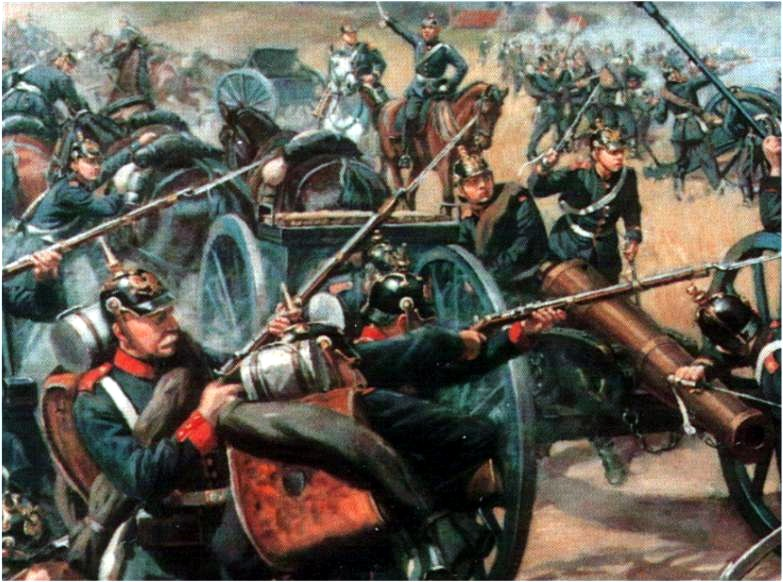
Prussian artillery at the Battle of Langensalza. Oil painting by Georg von Boddien.

Before the war started, both the Austrian and Prussian governments sought to rally allies in Germany. On 15 June Bismarck offered territorial compensation in the Grand Duchy of Hesse to the Electorate of Hesse, if Elector Frederick William were to ally with Prussia. The proposition grievously offended Frederick William's "legitimist sensibilities" and the monarch joined the Austrians, despite the Hessian Landtag voting for neutrality. King George V of Hanover during the spring of 1866 was contacted by Austrian Emperor Franz Joseph I about establishing a coalition against the Prussians, but his success took some time. The Hanoverian monarch concluded that his kingdom would fall if it were to fight against the Prussian armies.

Most of the southern German states sided with Austria against Prussia. Those doing so included the Kingdoms of Bavaria and Württemberg. Smaller middle states such as Baden, Hesse-Kassel (or Hesse-Cassel), Hesse-Darmstadt, and Nassau also joined with Austria. Many of the German princes allied with the Habsburgs principally out of a desire to keep their thrones.

Most of the northern German states joined Prussia, in particular Oldenburg, Mecklenburg-Schwerin, Mecklenburg-Strelitz, and Brunswick. The Kingdom of Italy participated in the war with Prussia, furthering the process of Italian unification. In return for their aid against Austria, Bismarck agreed not to make a separate peace until Florence had obtained Venetia.

As calculated, the other foreign powers abstained from this war. French Emperor Napoleon III, a merited friend of Italian risorgimento who expected a Prussian defeat, chose to retain the unmobilized army, upholding his influence to suit Florence while endangering his negotiating position for territory along the Rhine. When the Prussian victory became clear, Paris attempted to extract concessions in the Bavarian Palatinate, Rhenish Hesse and Luxembourg. In his speech to the Reichstag on 2 May 1871, Bismarck said:

It is known that even on 6 August 1866, I was in the position to observe the French ambassador make his appearance to see me in order, to put it succinctly, to present an ultimatum: to relinquish Mainz, or to expect an immediate declaration of war. Naturally I was not doubtful of the answer for a second. I answered him: "Good, then it's war!" He travelled to Paris with this answer. A few days after one in Paris thought differently, and I was given to understand that this instruction had been torn from Emperor Napoleon during an illness. The further attempts in relation to Luxemburg are known.

Alliances of the Austro-Prussian War, 1866
Kingdom of Prussia
Austrian Empire
Neutral/passive
- Duchy of Brunswick
- Grand Duchy of Mecklenburg-Schwerin
- Saxe-Coburg and Gotha
- Duchy of Saxe-Altenburg
- Grand Duchy of Mecklenburg-Strelitz
- Grand Duchy of Oldenburg
- Duchy of Anhalt
- Schwarzburg-Sondershausen
- Principality of Waldeck and Pyrmont
- Principality of Lippe
- Saxe-Lauenburg
- Free City of Lübeck
- Bremen
- Hamburg
- Kingdom of Italy
- Kingdom of Bavaria
- Kingdom of Saxony
- Kingdom of Hanover
- Kingdom of Württemberg
- Electorate of Hesse
- Grand Duchy of Baden
- Grand Duchy of Hesse
- Duchy of Nassau
- Duchy of Saxe-Meiningen
- Principality of Reuss-Greiz
- Principality of Schaumburg-Lippe
- Free City of Frankfurt
- Luxembourg
- Duchy of Limburg
- Grand Duchy of Saxe-Weimar-Eisenach
- Schwarzburg-Rudolstadt
- Liechtenstein
- Principality of Reuss-Gera
Disputed Territory
- Duchy of Holstein
- Duchy of Schleswig

== Course of the war ==
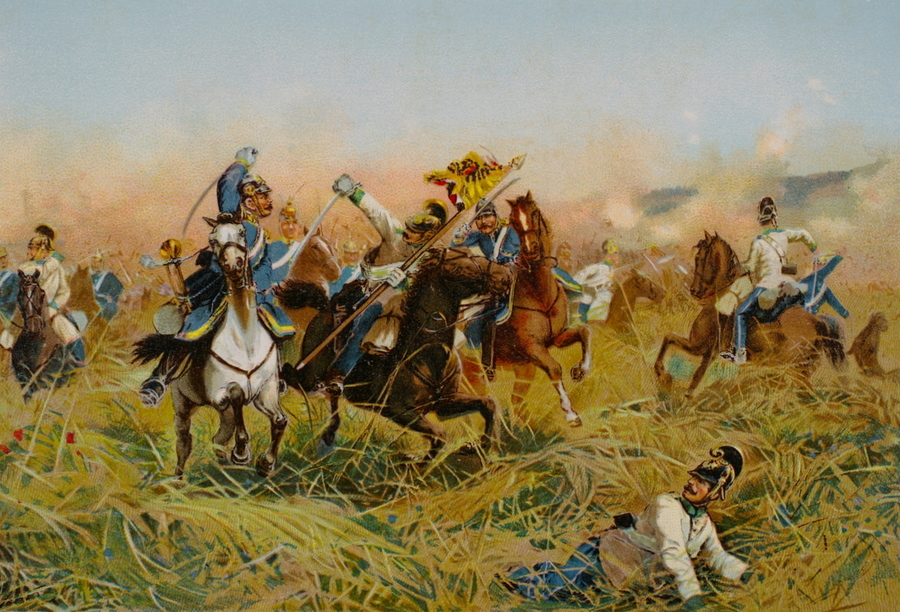
Cavalry clash at the Battle of Nachod

The first war between two major continental powers in seven years, the Austro-Prussian War used many of the same technologies as the Second Italian War of Independence, including railways to concentrate troops during mobilization and telegraphy to enhance long-distance communication. The Prussian armed forces used von Dreyse's breech-loading needle gun, which could be rapidly loaded while the soldier was seeking cover on the ground, whereas the Austrian muzzle-loading rifles could be loaded only slowly, and generally from a standing position.

The main campaign of the war occurred in the Habsburg Empire's Kingdom of Bohemia. Prussian Chief of General Staff Helmuth von Moltke had planned meticulously for the war. At the outset of the war in June, the Prussian armies were gathered along the Prussian border: the Army of the Elbe under Karl Herwarth von Bittenfeld at Torgau, the First Army under Prince Friedrich Karl of Prussia between Senftenberg and Görlitz, and the Second Army under Crown Prince Frederick William in Silesia west of Neiße (Nysa). Moltke rapidly mobilized the Prussian armies and advanced across the border into Saxony and Bohemia, where the Austrian army was concentrating for an invasion of Silesia. The Prussian armies converged in Bohemia, led nominally by King Wilhelm I, and the two sides met at the Battle of Königgrätz (Hradec Králové) on 3 July. The Prussian Army of the Elbe advanced on the Austrian left wing, and the First Army on the center, though this was premature, as they risked being counter-flanked on their own left. Victory therefore depended on the timely arrival of the Second Army on the left wing. This was achieved through the brilliant work of its chief of staff, Leonhard Graf von Blumenthal. Superior Prussian organization and vigor decided the battle against the federal troops, and the victory was near total, with Austrian battle deaths nearly seven times the Prussian figure. An armistice between the Empire and its rival came into effect at noon on 22 July. A preliminary peace was signed on 26 July at Nikolsburg.

Austrian victory at the naval Battle of Lissa

Except for Saxony, the other German states allied to Austria played little role in the main campaign. Stuck in the Thuringian Basin, Hanover's army defeated chaotic Prussians at the Battle of Langensalza on 27 June 1866, but, within a few days, they were forced to surrender by superior numbers and a homemade logistical catastrophe (they left both the supplies and nearly all ammunition in Hanover). Prussian armies fought against Bavaria, Württemberg, Baden and the Hessian states during the campaign of the Main (river), reaching Nuremberg and Frankfurt. The Bavarian fortress of Würzburg was shelled by Prussian artillery, but the garrison defended its position until armistice day.

The Austrians were more successful in their war with Italy, defeating the Italians on land at the Battle of Custoza (24 June), and on sea at the Battle of Lissa (20 July). However, Italy's "Hunters of the Alps" led by Garibaldi defeated the Austrians at the Battle of Bezzecca on 21 July, conquered the lower part of Trentino, and moved towards Trento. While the temporary Alpine conquest missed political support by allies, a redeployment of Austrian troops in order to hold the Danube facilitated an Italian march through the Venetian coastal plain, finally resulting in the armistice of Cormons on 12 August.

=== Major battles ===
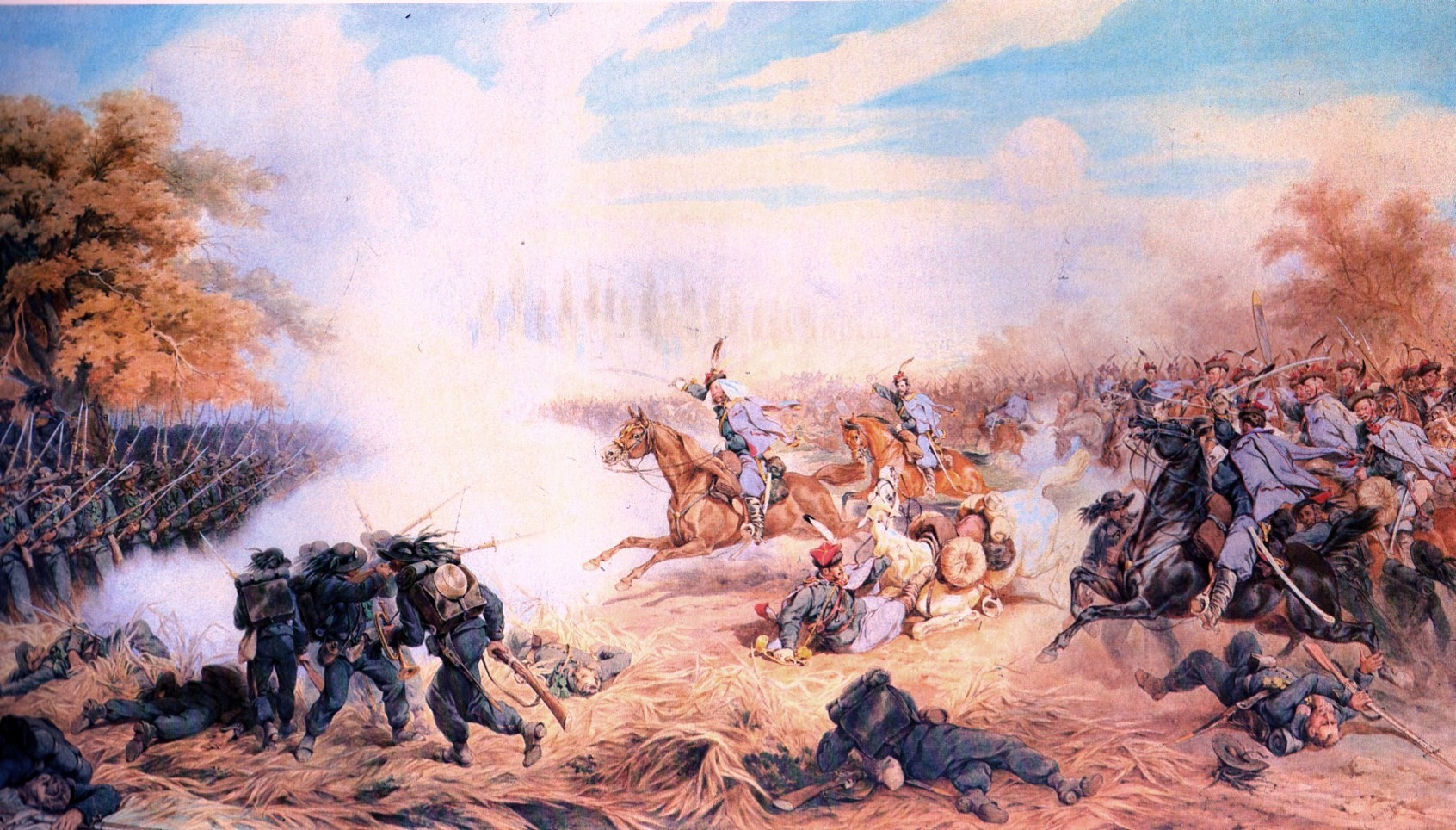
Austrian uhlans under Colonel Rodakowski attack Italian Bersaglieri during the Battle of Custoza

- 24 June, Battle of Custoza: Austrian army defeats Italian army.
- 27 June, Battle of Náchod: Prussians defeat Austrians.
- 27 June, Battle of Trautenau (Trutnov): Austrians check Prussian advance but with heavy losses.
- 27 June, Battle of Langensalza: Hanover's army defeats Prussia's. However, Hanover surrenders two days later.
- 29 June, Battle of Gitschin (Jičín): Prussians defeat Austrians.
- 3 July, Battle of Königgrätz (Sadová): overwhelming Prussian victory against Austrians.
- 10 July, Battle of Kissingen: Prussians defeat the Bavarians (7th Army Corps of the German Confederation).
- 20 July, Battle of Lissa (Vis): the Austrian fleet decisively defeats the Italian one.
- 21 July, Battle of Bezzecca: Giuseppe Garibaldi's "Hunters of the Alps" defeat an Austrian army.
- 22 July (last day of the war), Battle of Lamacs (Lamač): Austrians defend Bratislava against Prussian army.
- 24 July, Battle of Tauberbischofsheim, the Federal 8th Corps (Württemberg, Baden, Hesse and Nassau) is defeated by Prussia and northern Württemberg is occupied.

== Aftermath and consequences ==
Bismarck had to overcome the obdurate resistance of King Wilhelm I, interested in substantial annexations of Austrian territory, whereas himself, who wanted to keep all future possibilities open with regard to the enemy, intended to offer rather generous terms. The monarch finally yielded to Bismarck. Furthermore, Wilhelm had "planned to install both the crown prince of Hanover and the nephew of the elector of Hesse as titular grand dukes in small territorial residuals of their dynastic inheritance" due to opposition in the government cabinet, including Crown Prince Frederick William of Prussia, to the annexation of several German states. Vienna preferred to support the Habsburg Empire's Saxon neighbor and they both accepted mediation from France's Napoleon III. The Peace of Prague on 23 August 1866 resulted in the dissolution of the German Confederation, Prussian annexation of four of Austria's former allies, and the permanent exclusion of Austria from German affairs. This left Berlin free to form the North German Confederation finalized the next year, incorporating all the German states north of the Main River.

=== For the defeated parties and Schleswig-Holstein ===
The North German Confederation (red), the South German states (gold), and Alsace-Lorraine (yellow), all soon to form the German Empire

In addition to war reparations, the following territorial changes took place:

- Austria: Avoided ceding Istria and Dalmatia to Italy by the mediation of Napoleon III. Ceded Venetia to Italy by the Treaty of Vienna (1866), later confirmed by plebiscite.
- Schleswig-Holstein (Austro-Prussian condominium): Annexed by Prussia, became the Province of Schleswig-Holstein.
- Hanover: Annexed by Prussia, became the Province of Hanover.
- Hesse-Darmstadt: Surrendered to Prussia the small territory it had acquired earlier in 1866 on the extinction of the ruling house of Hesse-Homburg. The northern half of the remaining land joined the North German Confederation.
- Nassau, Hesse-Kassel and Frankfurt: Annexed by Prussia and combined with the territory surrendered by Hesse-Darmstadt to form the new Province of Hesse-Nassau. Frankfurt was ordered to pay 31 million guilders in reparations, although it had not put any soldiers in the field. In the end, 6 million guilders were paid, but 3 million were refunded.
- Saxony, Saxe-Meiningen, Reuss-Greiz and Schaumburg-Lippe: Spared from annexation but joined the North German Confederation in the following year.
- Bavaria: Lost the fringe possessions of Bad Orb and Gersfeld as well as the exclave of Kaulsdorf (Saale) to Prussia, and became a permanent ally protecting southern Germany against France.

=== For the neutral German parties and Liechtenstein ===
Those former German Confederation member states who remained neutral or passive during the conflict took different actions after the Prague treaty:

- Liechtenstein: Became an independent state and declared permanent neutrality, while maintaining close political ties with Austria. Accused by Bismarck of having manipulated the Confederation Diet vote, the Principality had sent 80 men out on the Imperial side against the Italian volunteers but did not engage in any fighting. There has been a longstanding yet unverified claim that Liechtenstein's auxiliary force returned home with an extra man, stated either as an "Italian friend" or a defector.
- Limburg and Luxembourg had the Dutch king as their head of state (as Grand Duke of Luxembourg and Duke of Limburg). The Treaty of London (1867) affirmed the duchy of Limburg as an integral part of the Kingdom of the Netherlands, henceforth becoming the Dutch province of Limburg. Luxembourg was guaranteed independence and neutrality from its three neighbours (Belgium, France, and Prussia), but it remained linked by a personal union to the Netherlands until 1890 and a member of the Zollverein until its dissolution in 1919.
- Reuss-Gera, Saxe-Weimar-Eisenach, Schwarzburg-Rudolstadt: Joined the North German Confederation.

=== For the new Prussia ===
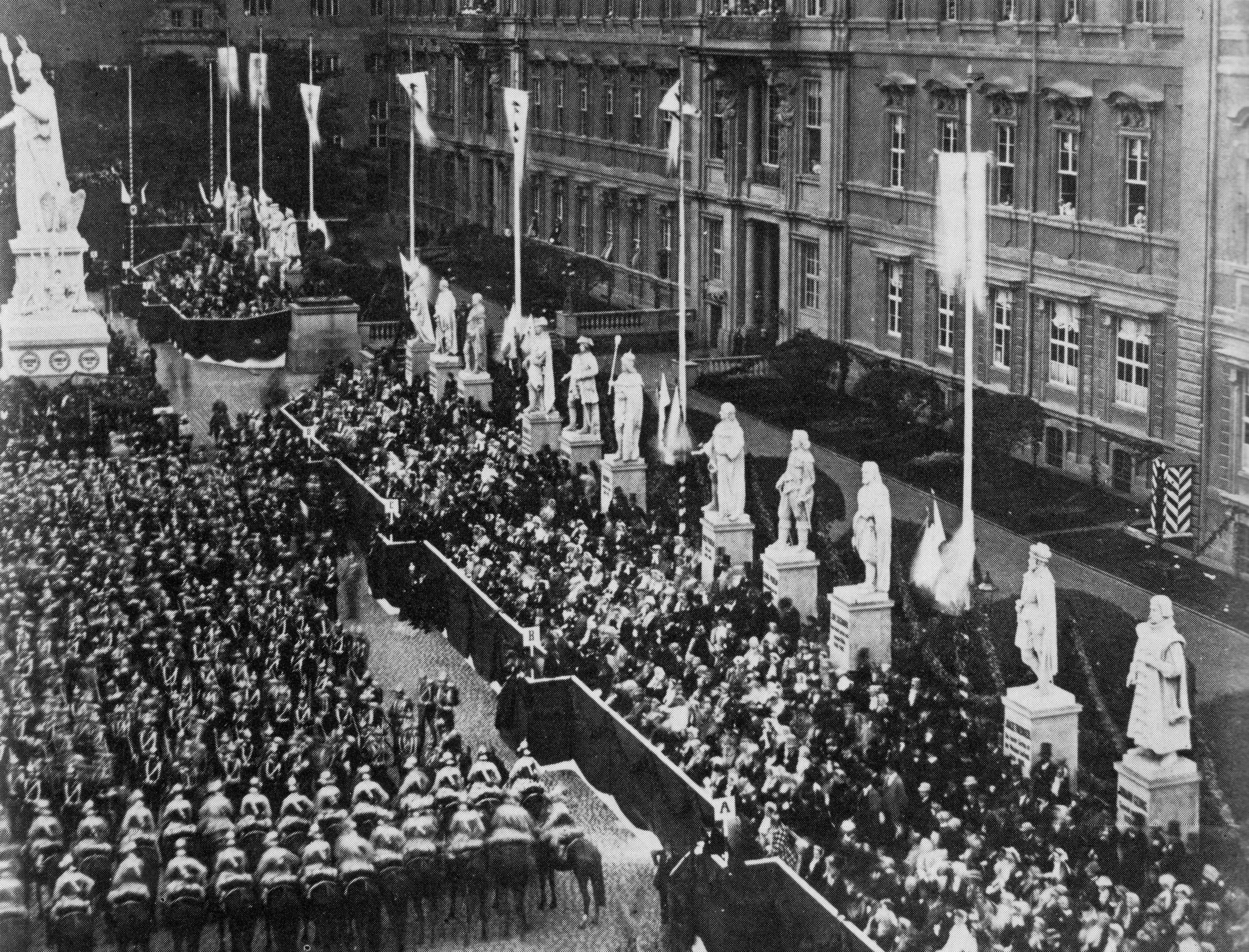
Reception of Prussian troops in Berlin on 21 September 1866

Prussia and the North German Confederation were headed in personal union by King Wilhelm, holder of the Bundespräsidium, and essentially shared their executive power. The territory of the union also encompassed Prussia's Baltic and Polish as well as its remote Danish regions. Federal Chancellor Bismarck used occasions like the "Three Emperors Dinner" of 1867 in Paris and backed up the Kingdom's dominance over the so-called Lesser Germany with an emerging Russian alliance. His successful policy found support in new political forces, namely the Free Conservative Party and the National Liberal Party.

The vanishing authorities protested against their annexation to Berlin's Hohenzollern monarchy, and both the dethroned rulers and the local population lamented the loss of sovereignty. Local resistance and regional loyalty led Hans von Hardenberg, the civil commissioner who oversaw the integration of Hanover into Prussia, to remark that "As a whole the Hanoverians are a tougher, less accommodating tribe than the Saxons. Their particularism rests not solely on Prussophobia ... but above all on a deep-rooted conviction that life is nowhere better than in Hanover. Theirs is a solid ... national feeling". The protests of George V of Hanover and the local population proved to be an effective obstacle to Hanover's assimilation into Prussia, and led to the founding of the German-Hanoverian Party, which received 46.6% of the Hanoverian vote in the March 1871 Reichstag election. Hostility to annexation was also felt in smaller annexed countries such as the central one, where the dethroned Prince Frederick William of Hesse-Kassel strongly condemned "the usurpation of the Electorate of Hesse by the crown of Prussia". Anti-annexationist petitions were organised and reached a significant number of signatures, with a separatist one in Hanover mobilizing half a million. In Nassau, Prussian soldiers were reportedly attacked by locals "with stones and axes"; according to Jasper Heinzen, "brawls between occupation troops and local veterans soon became so prevalent that one historian has called these incidents the most distinctive inaugural feature of the Prussian era".

Anti-Prussian and separatist sentiment in the new provinces continued into the next confrontation, as local Prussian authorities complained about "a not insignificant number" of deserters from Hanover and Schleswig, and the population reacted to the Franco-Prussian War with "recurrent acts of sabotage on telegraph lines, latent French sympathies, and a widespread disinterest in the establishment of armed home guards". Nevertheless, the formed North German Confederation would go on to win the war and unite with its allies Bavaria, Baden, Württemberg and southern Hesse. According to Geoffrey Wawro, the political and military power accumulated by Prussia allowed it to annex the northern German states in 1866 and then "force the Catholic states very much against their will into a federal union" in 1871. The resulting German Empire would become one of the most influential world powers.

=== Bonapartist lure and lukewarm Austrian desire for revenge ===
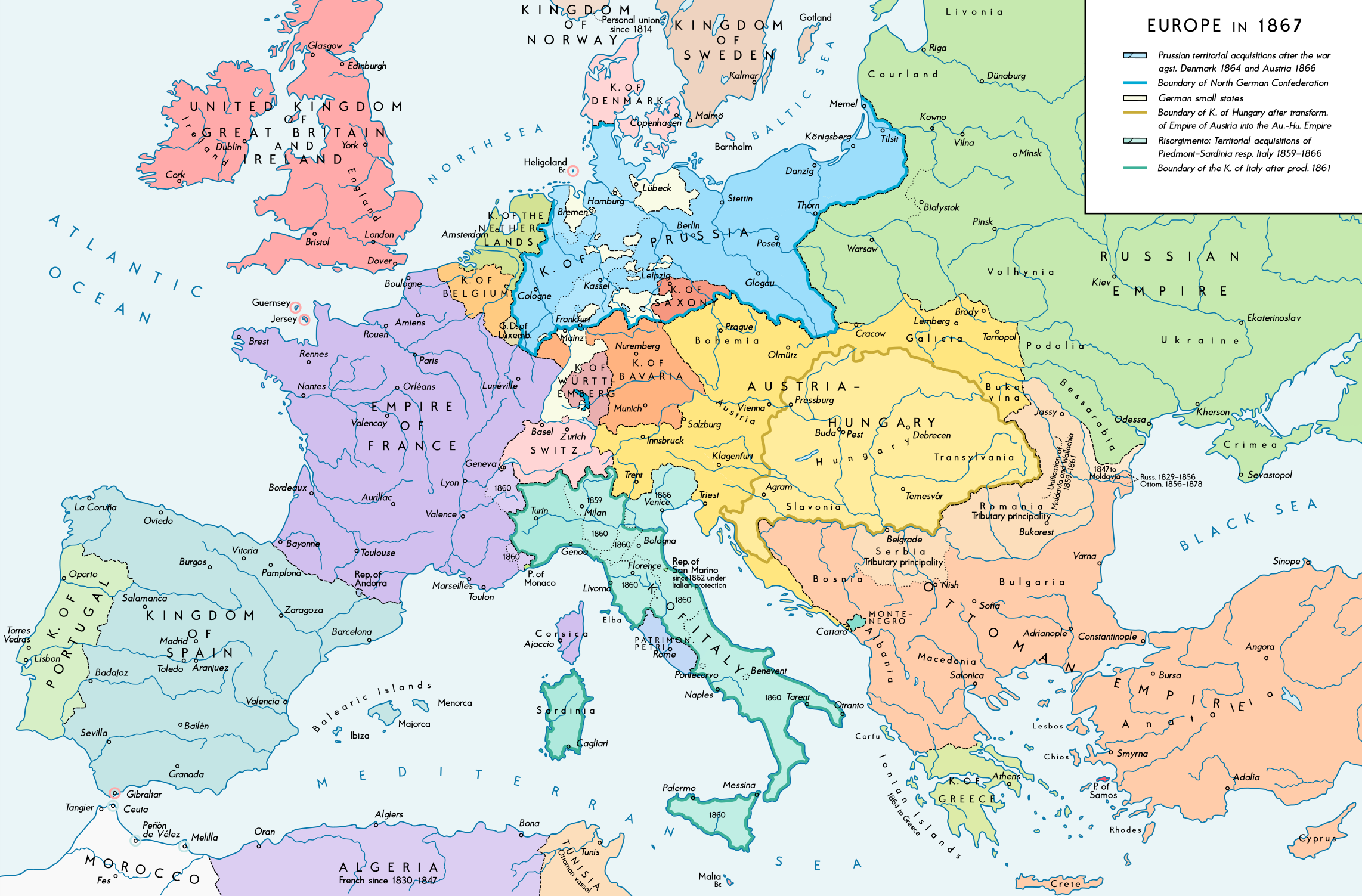
Map of Europe in 1867

It was in order to prevent "unnecessary bitterness of feeling or desire for revenge" and forestall intervention by France or Russia that Bismarck had pushed King Wilhelm to make peace with the Austrians rapidly, rather than continue the war in hopes of further gains. As to the exclusion from political Germany, the conciliatory Emperor Francis Joseph I did not face notable public pressure for resilience, although the French ruler made him restrict a negotiated freedom of the failing South German Confederation to reunite with the North.

Having lost his position as minister-president of Saxony over his Prussian counterpart's unwillingness to negotiate the peace with him, the new Austrian leader Count Friedrich Ferdinand von Beust was "impatient to take his revenge on Bismarck for Sadowa". As a preliminary step, the Austro-Hungarian Compromise of 1867 was "rapidly concluded". The Protestant Beust "persuaded Francis Joseph to accept Magyar demands which he had until then rejected", but Austrian plans fell short of French hopes (e.g. Archduke Albrecht, Duke of Teschen proposed a plan which required the French army to fight alone for six weeks in order to allow Austrian mobilization). King Victor Emmanuel II and the Italian government wanted to join this potential alliance, but domestic public opinion there was bitterly opposed as long as Paris kept a French garrison in Rome protecting Pope Pius IX, thereby denying the country the possession of its capital (Rome had been declared so in March 1861, when the first national parliament had met in Turin). Napoleon III was not strictly opposed to this (in response to a French minister of State's declaration that Italy would never lay its hands on Rome, the Emperor had commented "You know, in politics, one should never say 'never'.") and had made various proposals for resolving the Roman Question, but Pius rejected them all. Despite his support for Italian unification, Napoleon could not press the issue for fear of angering Catholics in France. Raffaele de Cesare, an Italian journalist, political scientist, and author, noted that:

The alliance, proposed two years before 1870, between France, Italy, and Austria, was never concluded because Napoleon III ... would never consent to the occupation of Rome by Italy. ... He wished Austria to avenge Sadowa, either by taking part in a military action, or by preventing South Germany from making common cause with Prussia. ... If he could ensure, through Austrian aid, the neutrality of the South German States in a war against Prussia, he considered himself sure of defeating the Prussian army, and thus would remain arbiter of the European situation. But when the war suddenly broke out, before anything was concluded, the first unexpected French defeats overthrew all previsions, and raised difficulties for Austria and Italy which prevented them from making common cause with France. ... For twenty years Napoleon III had been the true sovereign of Rome, where he had many friends and relations ... Without him the temporal power would never have been reconstituted, nor, being reconstituted, would have endured.

Another reason that Imperial Chancellor Beust's supposedly desired revanche against Prussia did not materialize is seen in the fact that, in 1870, the Hungarian Prime Minister Count Gyula Andrássy was "vigorously opposed".

== See also ==
- Wars and battles involving Prussia

== Sources ==
- Balfour, Michael (1964). The Kaiser and his Times. Houghton Mifflin. ISBN 0-39300-661-1.
- Barry, Quintin (2010). Road to Koniggratz: Helmuth von Moltke and the Austro-Prussian War 1866. Helion. ISBN 978-1906033378.
- Bassett-Powell, Bruce (2013). Armies of Bismarck's Wars: Prussian 1860–67. Casemate. ISBN 978-1935149231.
- Breuilly, John (1996). The Formation of the First German Nation-State, 1800–1871. Red Globe Press. ISBN 0333527186.
- Bond, Brian (1966). "The Austro-Prussian War, 1866". History Today. 16 (8): 538–546.
- Clodfelter, M. (2017). Warfare and Armed Conflicts: A Statistical Encyclopedia of Casualty and Other Figures, 1492–2015 (4th ed.). Jefferson, North Carolina: McFarland. ISBN 978-0786474707.
- Heinzen, Jasper (2017). Making Prussians, Raising Germans: A Cultural History of Prussian State-Building after Civil War, 1866–1935. York, England: Cambridge University Press. doi:10.1017/9781108182737. ISBN 978-1107198791.
- Hollyday, FBM (1970), Bismarck, Great Lives Observed, Prentice-Hall
- Hozier, H. M. (2012). The Seven Weeks' War: the Austro-Prussian Conflict of 1866.
- McElwee, William (1974). The Art of War: Waterloo to Mons. Bloomington: Indiana University Press. ISBN 0-253-20214-0.
- Prussian General Staff (1872). The Campaign of 1866 in Germany. Translated by von Wright, Colonel; Hozier, Henry M. London: Clowes & Sons.
- Scheibert, Justus (1863). Seven Months in the Rebel States During the North American War 1863.
- Showalter, Dennis E. (2004). The Wars of German Unification.
- Taylor, A. J. P. (1948). The Habsburg Monarchy 1809–1918 (2nd ed.).
- Taylor, A. J. P. (1955). Bismarck: the Man and Statesman.
- Wawro, Geoffrey (1997). The Austro-Prussian War: Austria's War with Prussia and Italy in 1866. Cambridge University Press. ISBN 0-521-62951-9.
- Wawro, Geoffrey (2003). The Franco–Prussian War: The German Conquest of France in 1870–1871. Cambridge University Press. ISBN 0-521-58436-1.
