= Hellion =

Hellion(s) may refer to a word for a mischievous person or:

== Books ==
- Hellion (character), a comic book character from X-Men
- Hellions (Marvel Comics), several groups of fictional hellions in Marvel Comics

== Film and TV ==
- The Hellion (1924 film), an American Western film
- The Hellion (1919 film), a silent film drama
- The Hellions, a 1961 British adventure film set in South Africa
- Hellion (film), a 2014 film
- Hellions (film), a 2015 film

== Music ==
- Hellion (band), an American heavy metal band
- Hellions (band), an Australian post-hardcore band
- "Hellion", a song by W.A.S.P. from the album W.A.S.P., 1984
- "The Hellion", an instrumental by Judas Priest from the album Screaming for Vengeance, 1982

== Sports ==
- Hellions of Troy, an American roller derby league
- Hartford Hellions, an American soccer team

== Games ==
- Hellion (video game), a video game by Zero Gravity

== See also ==
- Hell:on, a Ukrainian thrash/death metal band
- Upton Hellions, an English village
