= Costantino Nigra =

Italian nobleman, diplomat, and politician (1828–1907)

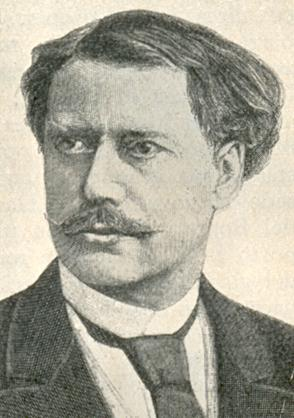

Member of the Senate
- In office 24 November 1892 – 1 July 1907

Personal details
- Born: Lorenzo Annibale Costantino Nigra; June 11, 1828 Turin, Kingdom of Sardinia
- Died: 1 July 1907 (aged 79) Rapallo, Kingdom of Italy
- Party: Historical Right
- Education: University of Turin
- Occupation: Nobleman, philologist, poet, diplomat, politician

Lorenzo Annibale Costantino Nigra, Count of Villa Castelnuovo (11 June 1828 – 1 July 1907), was an Italian nobleman, philologist, poet, diplomat and politician. Among the several positions that he held and political and foreign affairs in which he was involved in the Kingdom of Piedmont-Sardinia and Kingdom of Italy, he served as ambassador and was later appointed a member of the Senate of the Kingdom of Italy.

== Biography ==
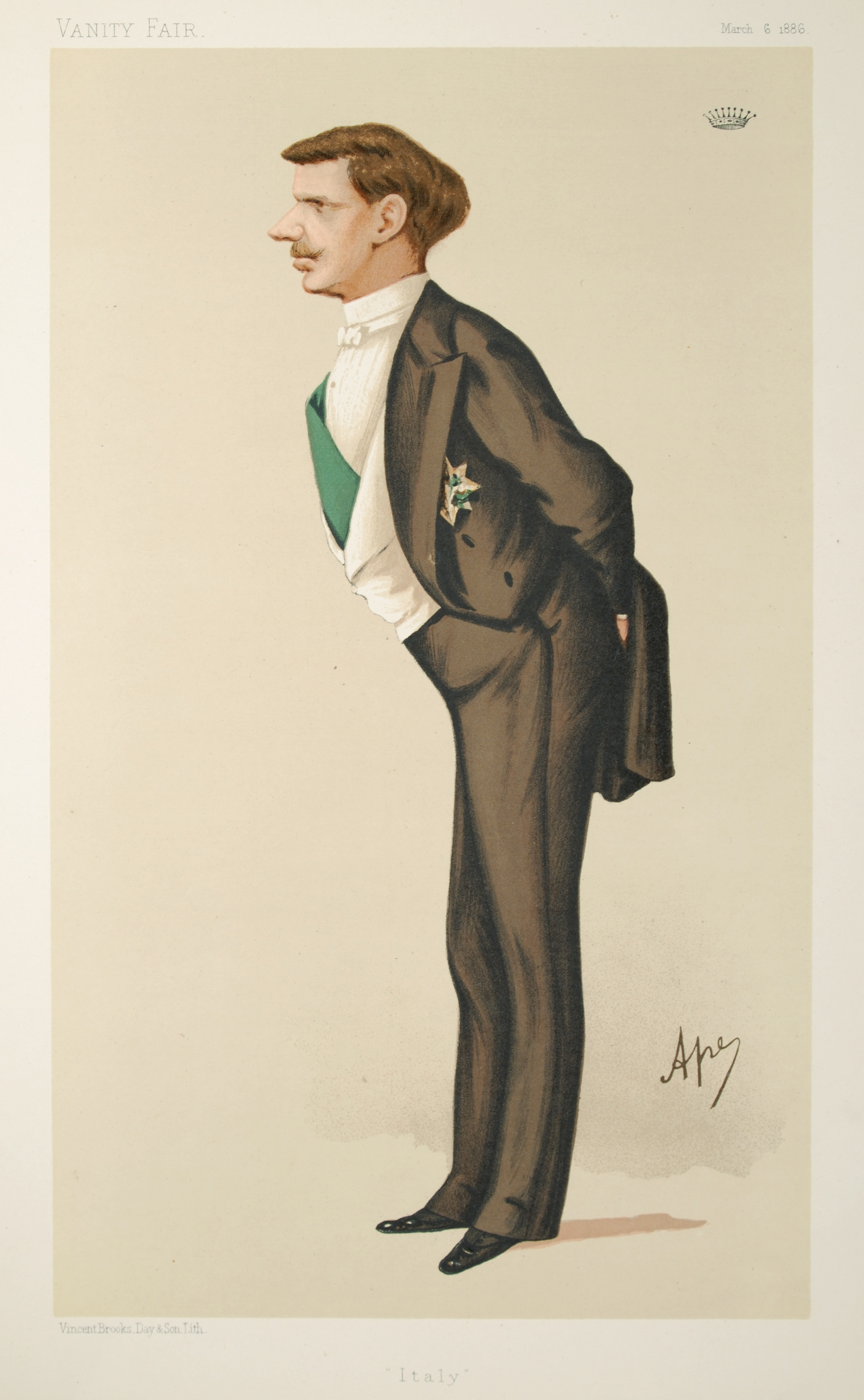
Nigra as caricatured by Ape in Vanity Fair, 6 March 1886. Caption reads "Italy".

Nigra was born in Villa Castelnuovo, in the Province of Turin, Piedmont. He graduated in jurisprudence at the University of Turin. During the Revolutions of 1848 in the Italian states, he interrupted his studies to serve as a volunteer against the Austrian Empire, and was wounded at the battle of Rivoli. On the conclusion of peace, he entered the Kingdom of Piedmont-Sardinia's foreign office; he accompanied King Victor Emmanuel II and Camillo Benso, Count of Cavour, to Paris and London in 1855. In 1856, he took part in the conference of Paris by which the Crimean War was brought to an end.

After the meeting at Plombières between Cavour and Napoleon III, Nigra was again sent to Paris, this time to popularise a Franco–Piedmontese alliance, Nigra being, as Cavour said, the only person perhaps who knows all my thoughts, even the most secret. He was instrumental in negotiating the marriage between Victor Emmanuel's daughter, Clothilde, and Napoleon's nephew, and during the Second Italian War of Independence in 1859, he was always with the emperor. He was recalled from Paris when the occupation of the Marche and Umbria by the Piedmontese caused a breach in Franco–Italian relations, and was appointed secretary of state to the prince of Carignano, viceroy of the Neapolitan provinces.

When Napoleon recognized the Kingdom of Italy in 1861, Nigra returned to France as minister-resident and for many years played a most important part in political affairs and for Cavour; for his account of the administration of the Neapolitan provinces, Giustino Fortunato judged it an "admirable brave writing ... that is worth so much gold". During his mandate in Paris, Nigra contributed to the negotiations that led, thanks to the consent of Napoleon, to the conclusion of the Italo-Prussian Alliance in 1866 ahead of the Third Italian War of Independence. In 1870, after his capture in the battle of Sedan, Napoleon was taken prisoner. As ambassador in Paris, Nigra remained the only friend of Empress Eugénie de Montijo, who was appointed regent. Since the people had risen proclaiming a republic, the French Third Republic, Nigra helped them escape and save themselves. Having become a friend of Virginia Oldoini, Countess of Castiglione through Cavour, he was later her lover in Paris.

In 1876, Nigra was transferred to St. Petersburg with the rank of ambassador, in 1882 to London and in 1885 to Vienna. In 1899, he represented Italy at the First Hague Peace Conference. He was created count in 1882 and senator in 1890. Having retired in 1904, he died at Rapallo on 1 July 1907.

He was a sound classical scholar and published translations of many Greek and Latin poems with valuable comments. He was also a poet and the author of several works of folklore and popular poetry, of which the most important is his Canti popolari del Piemonte. Shortly after Cavour's death in 1861, he was elected as Great Master of the Grand Orient of Italy. In February 1860, Nigra had joined the regular Masonic Lodge Ausonia of Turin.

== Honours ==
=== Italy ===
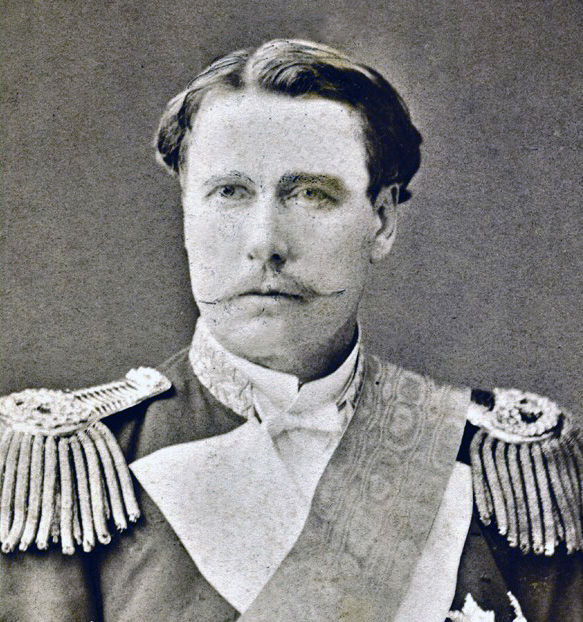
Nigra in military outfit

- Knight of the Supreme Order of the Most Holy Annunciation, 1892.
- Grand Cordon of the Order of Saints Maurice and Lazarus, 1892.
- Knight Grand Cross of the Order of the Crown of Italy, 1892.

=== Foreign ===
- Knight of the Imperial Order of Saint Alexander Nevsky, Russian Empire.
- Knight Grand Cross of the Royal Military Order of Our Lord Jesus Christ, Kingdom of Portugal.
- Knight Grand Star of the Order of the Lion and the Sun, Qajar Empire.
- Knight Class I of the Order of the Iron Crown, Austro–Hungarian Empire.
- Grand Official of the National Order of the Legion of Honour, Second French Empire.
- Commander of the Order of Isabella the Catholic, Kingdom of Spain.
- Knight IV Class of the Order of the Red Eagle, German Empire.
- Knight II Class of the Order of the Dannebrog, Kingdom of Denmark.

=== Honorary degrees ===
- Honorary degree for studies in literature and applied philology, related to the collection of popular songs, University of Edinburgh.
- Honorary degree for studies in literature and applied philology, related to the collection of popular songs, University of Kraków.

== Works ==
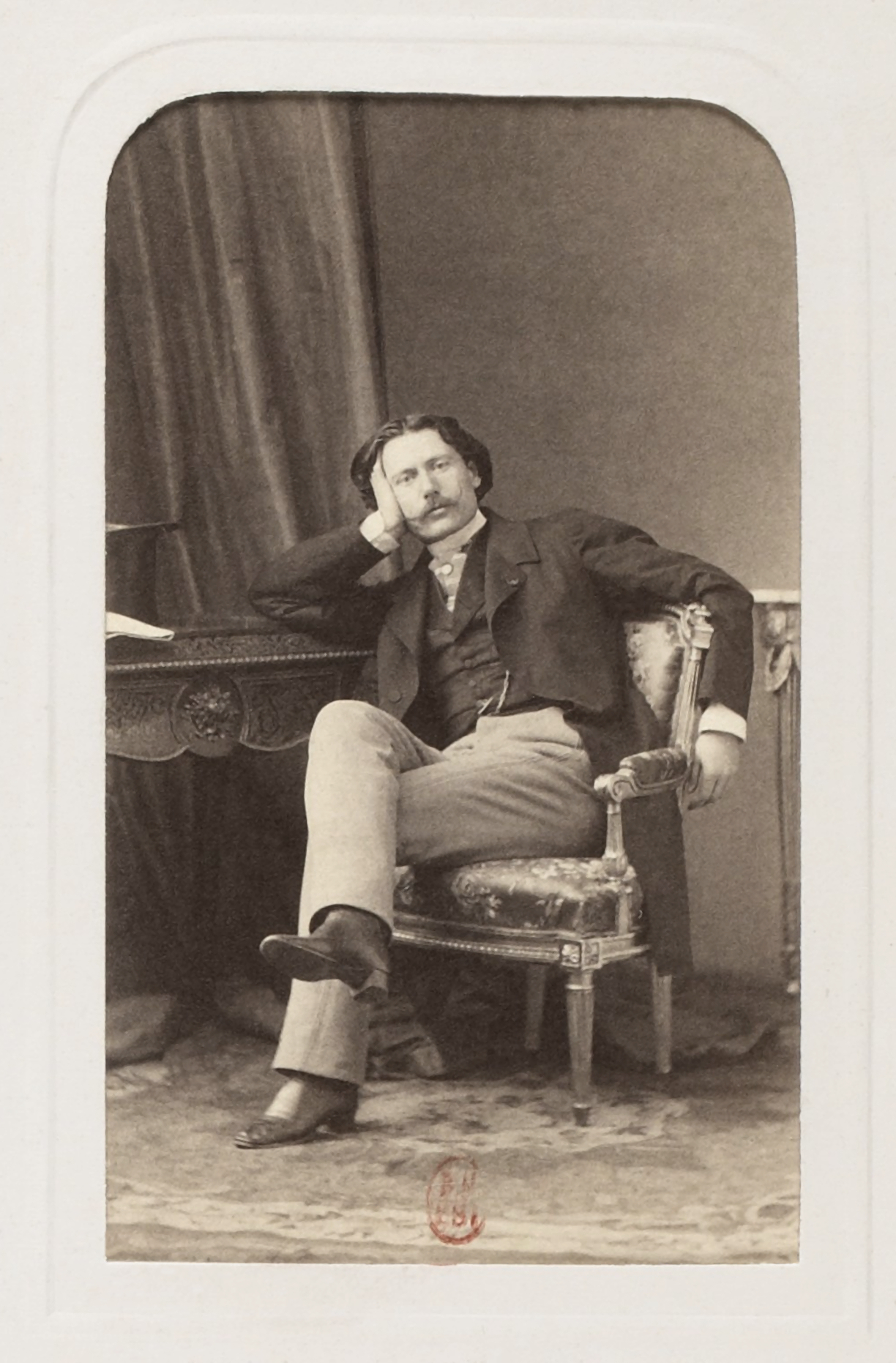
Nigra in the 1860s

Nigra's work included La rassegna di Novara (1861), published in 1875; La gondola Veneziana (barcarola) (1863); Le reliquie Celtiche (1872); Canti popolari del Piemonte in 1888; La chioma di Berenice (Callimaco), an 1891 elegy by Callimachus with text in Latin by Catullus; Inni di Callimaco su Diana e sui lavacri di Pallade, an 1892 translation, review, and commentary of Callimachus; and Idillii (1903). He collaborated with Italian and French academies and Italian, French, and German philological journals. On 13 December 1883, he became National Correspondent for the Philology category of the Moral Sciences Class of the Accademia dei Lincei.

== Bibliography ==
- Borelli, Pierfelice (1992). Costantino Nigra, il diplomatico del Risorgimento (in Italian). Cavallermaggiore: Gribaudo Editore. ISBN 978-8-8498-5179-3.
- Cabod, Federico (1997). Storia della Politica estera italiana dal 1870 al 1896 (in Italian). Rome; Bari: Laterza. ISBN 978-88-420-3595-4.
- Fassino, Gianpaolo; Grimaldi, Piercarlo, eds. (2011). Costantino Nigra etnologo. Le opere e i giorni. Atti del convegno di studi (27-29 giugno 2008) (in Italian). Turin: Omega. ISBN 978-8-8724-1582-5 – via Academia.edu.
- Levra, Umberto, ed. (2009). L'opera politica di Costantino Nigra (in Italian). Bologna: Il Mulino. ISBN 978-88-15-12759-4.
- Porciani, Franca; et al. (preface by Cardini, Franco) (2017). Costantino Nigra. L'agente segreto del Risorgimento. Catanzaro: Rubbettino Editore. ISBN 978-8-8498-5179-3 – via Google Books.
- Sorce Keller, Marcello (2011). "Costantino Nigra und die Balladen-Forschung. Betrachtungen über die Beziehung zwischen Nord-Italien, Frankreich und der Suisse Romande". Bulletin. Gesellschaft für die Volksmusik in der Schweiz (in German) (X): 33–40.
