= Helon =

Helon may refer to:

== People ==
- Helon (biblical figure), an Israelite of the Tribe of Zebulun
- Helon Blount (1929–2005), American actress
- Helon Habila (born 1967), Nigerian novelist and poet
- Helon Ollivierre (1881–1907), Trinidadian cricketer
- George Helon (born 1965), Australian writer

== Other uses ==
- Helon or Helong language, spoken in West Timor
- helon, in physics, a proposed form of the preon theoretical sub-quark particle
- Helon (Chinese: 恒天海龙) – see List of companies listed on the Shenzhen Stock Exchange

== See also ==
- Helen (disambiguation)
- Helion (disambiguation)
- Elon (disambiguation)
