= Helium (disambiguation) =

Helium is a chemical element with symbol He and atomic number 2.

Helium may also refer to:

== In science ==
- Helium dating, a method of determining the age of rocks
- Helium fusion, a type of nuclear fusion in stars
- Helium flash, the sudden beginning of helium fusion in certain kinds of stars
- Isotopes of helium
  - Helium-3
  - Helium-4

== Music ==
- Helium (band), American rock band
- Helium (Pram album), 1994
- Helium (H3llb3nt album), 1998
- Helium (Homeshake album)
- "Helium" (Sia song), song from Fifty Shades Darker: Original Motion Picture Soundtrack
- "Helium", song on the 1996 album West by Mark Eitzel
- "Helium", song on the 1997 album The Answer Machine? by Skyclad
- "Helium", song on the 1999 EP Total Eclipse of the Sun by Einstürzende Neubauten
- "Helium", song on the 2002 album Comfort in Sound by Feeder
- "Helium", 2002 song and single by the Dallas Superstars
- "Helium", 2016 song and single by Mikey Wax
- "Helium", 2016 song and single by Mikael Gabriel
- "Helium", song on the 2025 EP Desire: Unleash by Enhypen

== Other ==
- Helium (film), a 2014 short film
- Helium, a fictional city-state in Edgar Rice Burroughs' Barsoom series of novels
- The Late B.P. Helium, recording project and stage name of Bryan Poole
- Helium Network, a decentralized wireless network

== See also ==
- Helios (disambiguation)
- Heliu (disambiguation)
- He (disambiguation)
- Helius (fly), a genus of crane fly in the family Limoniidae
