= Alvensleben Convention =

1863 treaty between Russia and Prussia

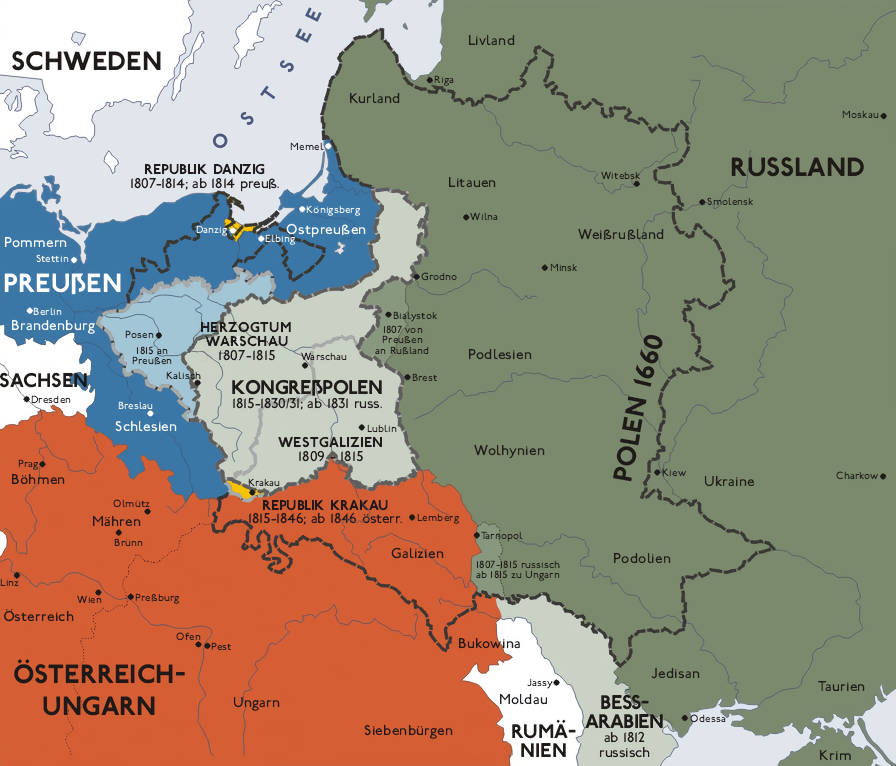
Congress Poland (grey) and Prussia (blue)

The Alvensleben Convention was a treaty between the Russian Empire and the Kingdom of Prussia, named after general Gustav von Alvensleben. It was signed in St. Petersburg on 8 February 1863 by General Alvensleben and Alexander Gorchakov, the Russian Foreign Minister.

== The Convention ==
In January 1863 an uprising against the Russian rule in Congress Poland occurred. Prussia immediately closed its border and mobilised the Prussian Army to secure its eastern provinces against a similar event. Initiated by Prime Minister Otto von Bismarck, Alvensleben, the Prussian King's personal adjutant, was dispatched to Tsar Alexander II of Russia’s court to negotiate common measures with regard to the insurgents. The two powers agreed on the right of each of their military forces to cross the border in pursuit of Polish revolutionaries and to extradite them to Russian military courts.

The convention was never implemented as Russia dealt on its own with the Polish uprising.

== Political consequences ==
=== In Prussia ===
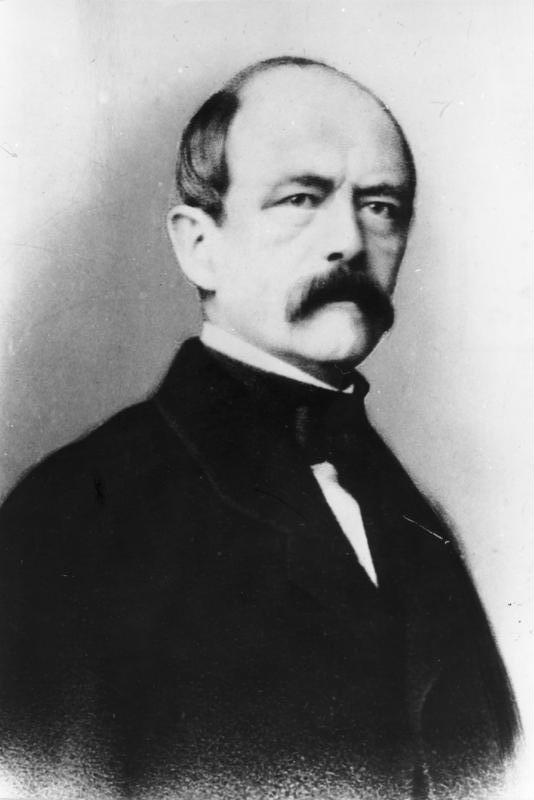
Prussian Prime Minister Otto von Bismarck

Bismarck, who had just been appointed Prime Minister in September 1862 and ruled without a parliamentary majority, was criticized by liberal Prussian politicians like Hans Victor von Unruh and Heinrich von Sybel, who sympathized with the plight of the Poles.

The treaty led to clashes in the Prussian Landtag and after the president of the parliament interrupted Bismarck during a dispute over his Polish policy, he stated that he answered only to the King and was “not subject to the disciplinary authority vested in the president of the parliament.” The struggle between Bismarck and the Diet continued, and on 22 May 1863 the Diet sent a sharp note to the King: "The House of Deputies has no further means of coming to terms with this ministry.... Every further negotiation only strengthens our conviction that a chasm separates the advisors to the Crown and the Country." As a result, the king finally dissolved the diet.

Meanwhile, Bismarck publicly stated it was on the initiative of the Russians that the treaty had been formed, while Russian Foreign Minister Gorchakov declared that the Convention has never been put into force.

=== International affairs ===
The convention was criticized by western liberals and led to a serious diplomatic crisis. Great Britain and the Austrian Empire protested and especially Napoleon III, Emperor of the Second French Empire, showed his sympathies towards the uprising and suggested the dismissal of Bismarck as Prussian Prime Minister. Empress Eugenie already showed a map of Europe to the Austrian ambassador, which contained an independent Poland and a major realignment of European frontiers.

The convention improved Russo-Prussian relations, while Franco-Russian relations were strained by the open sympathy Napoleon III had shown towards the Poles. Bismarck himself later saw it as a precondition for the Russian neutrality in the Austro-Prussian and Franco-Prussian War.
