= Hellion (video game) =

- Developer: Zero Gravity Games
- Directors: Marko Smiljanic, Nemanja Lekic
- Artists: Nenad Petrovic, Nemanja Lekic
- Engine: Unity
- Platform: Microsoft Windows
- Release: October 21, 2019
- Genre: Survival
- Modes: Single-player, multiplayer

Hellion is an immersive hardcore space survival simulation game developed by Serbian studio Zero Gravity Games. It was released into the Steam Early Access program in February 2017. The game exposes players to the harshness of open space in the absence of gravity and the scarcity of resources to survive. The game presents a steep learning curve to maneuver through environments, open space as well as move about the interiors of spaceships or stations with or without artificial gravity. As an immersive 3D, first-person game, players must find and conserve their resources in the interest of their survival. Critical to this task they must discover other resources and space station modules which can be salvaged, repaired, and assembled into larger more complex stations. Multiplayer mode adds PvP to these gameplay elements.

On October 15, 2019, development on Hellion was suspended. On October 21, 2019, the game was officially released, version 0.5.2, and on April 1, 2020, it was removed from Steam.

== Gameplay ==
Broadly set in a zero-gravity environment, player and spacecraft movement in the game follows the traditional Newtonian physical vectors while stations adhere to orbital mechanics. Aboard a rescue craft or other salvaged spacecraft, players may define and travel into orbits around planetary bodies and other large naturally occurring astronomical phenomena. The player begins the game in a derelict de-orbiting space station equipped with only a bottle of oxygen and a jet pack for maneuvering. Players experience seamless interaction throughout the entire gaming environment with no loading screens. As a sandbox game, players are free to choose their own destiny or explore the demise of the colonial stations by following the in-game storyline.

As a multiplayer game, Hellion challenges players to collect and safeguard resources and assets from destruction and potential capture by other players since players may attack and claim their assets. The single-player aspect of the game focuses the player on the in-game story and space station expansion. In both modes, the player must perform ship or station repairs which involve resources which must be discovered and accumulated from within the fictional universe. As non-upgraded equipment deteriorates significantly faster than upgraded elements, this becomes a repeating process with progressive sustainability. The player is free to explore and achieve a notion of champion status among other players.

== Decommissioning ==
During the final 3 days of its presence on Steam, ZeroGravity made the game available to own by Steam users for free. For a brief period on March 31, the price returned to its previous usual price and then was removed from the online Steam Store at midnight, GMT.

On March 28, 2021, the previous Community Manager for Zero Gravity announced that the official Multiplayer Servers for the game had shut down. However, this did not include the Main Server, which is necessary for clients to be able to connect to Community hosted servers.

Owners of licensed copies of Hellion will continue to be able to play the game via Steam.
