= Justus Scheibert =

Prussian army officer and military strategist

- Born: 1831
- Died: 1903 (aged 71–72); Berlin
- Allegiance: Kingdom of Prussia
- Branch: Prussian Army
- Battles / wars: American Civil War (observing)

Captain Justus Scheibert (1831–1903) was a Prussian army officer, sent by Prussia to America to observe the American Civil War in order to learn the lessons to be learned and return to Prussia to teach these lessons to the Prussian troops. He traveled with Confederate troops and witnessed the Battle of Chancellorsville, the Second Battle of Charleston Harbor, and the Battle of Gettysburg. His writings became a source of Prussian, and later German, military strategy through five subsequent wars. He later became the editor of the "Post aus dem Riesengebirge".
