= Helion (meteoroid) =

A helion meteoroid is a sporadic meteoroid whose radiant lies near the ecliptic in the approximate direction of the Sun. It is one of the recognised sporadic meteor sources and forms a near-symmetric pair with the antihelion source, which lies at the opposite point away from the Sun. Because the helion radiant lies toward the Sun, its meteors enter the atmosphere on the daylit side of Earth and cannot be observed visually; radar shows it to be roughly as active as the antihelion source.

== Source ==
The source has been characterised through long-baseline radar monitoring. Using the Grahamstown all-sky meteor radar over 103 months (1986–1995), L. M. G. Poole examined the helion and antihelion regions at monthly intervals and found repeatable seasonal trends. Activity in both regions rises to a mid-year maximum, after which helion activity falls off significantly so that the antihelion region dominates through the latter half of the year. According to Poole, a mid-latitude all-sky radar most readily detects a meteor when its radiant lies near the celestial pole, producing a "polar artefact" that must be removed before source activity can be assessed.

== Origin ==
The helion source is generally thought to be debris of short-period comets and asteroids.
