= Heliu =

Heliu could refer to the following locations in China:

- Heliu, Anhui (河溜镇), town in Huaiyuan County
- Heliu, Shandong (河流镇), town in Yangxin County
