= Helion (publisher) =

Polish publishing company

Helion SA Publishing Group
- Type: Public
- Industry: Publishing
- Founded: 1991
- Headquarters: Gliwice, Poland
- Key people: Andrzej Pikoń (Chairman), Andrzej Kierzkowski (Vice-chairman)
- Products: IT Literature, business books, psychology advice books, advice literature, literary books
- Revenue: €10.05 million (2010)
- Operating income: €2.03 million (2010)
- Total equity: €3.08 million (2010)
- Number of employees: 500 (2010)
- Subsidiaries: Helion, Onepress, Sensus, Septem, Editio, Dla Bystrzaków, Bezdroża, Michelin (travel guides and maps)
- Website: www.helion.pl

Helion SA is a Polish publisher founded in 1991. It has published over 1,800 IT books, but also publishes business books under the Onepress imprint and psychology books as Sensus.

Further brands include Septem, Editio and Dla bystrzaków (For dummies)
