= Kingdom of Lombardy–Venetia =

Constituent land of the Austrian Empire (1815–1866)

Kingdom of Lombardy-Venetia Regno Lombardo-Veneto (Italian) Königreich Lombardo-Venetien, Österreichisches Italien (German)
- 1815–1866
- Flag Coat of Arms
- Motto: A.E.I.O.U. (motto for the House of Habsburg) "All the world is subject to Austria"
- Anthem: Inno Patriottico "The Patriotic Song"
- The Kingdom of Lombardy-Venetia (green) and the Austrian Empire (light green) in 1815
- Status: Crown land of the Austrian Empire
- Capital: Milan (1815–1859); Venice (1859–1866)
- Common languages: Lombard, Venetian, Friulian, Italian, and German
- Religion: Roman Catholic
- Government: Absolute monarchy
- King
  - 1815–1835: Francis I
  - 1835–1848: Ferdinand I
  - 1848–1866: Francis Joseph I
- Viceroy / Governor-General
  - 1815: Heinrich XV of Reuss-Plauen
  - 1815–1816: Heinrich von Bellegarde
  - 1816–1818: Anton Victor of Austria
  - 1818–1848: Rainer Joseph of Austria
  - 1848–1857: Joseph Radetzky von Radetz
  - 1857–1859: Ferdinand Maximilian of Austria
- History
  - Congress of Vienna: 9 June 1815
  - Five Days of Milan: 22 March 1848
  - Lombardy ceded to Sardinia-Piedmont: 10 November 1859
  - Austro-Prussian War: 14 June 1866
  - Peace of Prague: 23 August 1866
  - Treaty of Vienna: 12 October 1866

Area
- 1852: 46,782 km^{2} (18,063 sq mi)

Population
  - 1852: 4,671,000
- Currency: Lira (1816–1860); Fiorino (1860–1866)
Preceded by	Succeeded by
Kingdom of Italy (Napoleonic); Republic of San Marco	Second French Empire; Kingdom of Italy
- Today part of: Italy

The Kingdom of Lombardy–Venetia, commonly called the Lombardo-Venetian Kingdom, was a constituent land (crown land) of the Austrian Empire from 1815 to 1866. It was created in 1815 by resolution of the Congress of Vienna in recognition of the Austrian House of Habsburg-Lorraine's rights to the former Duchy of Milan and the former Republic of Venice after the Napoleonic Kingdom of Italy, proclaimed in 1805, had collapsed.

The kingdom survived for only fifty years—the region of Lombardy was ceded to France in 1859 after the Second Italian War of Independence, which then immediately ceded it to the Kingdom of Sardinia. Lombardy-Venetia was finally dissolved in 1866 when its remaining territory was incorporated into the recently proclaimed Kingdom of Italy following the kingdom's victory against Austria in the Third Italian War of Independence.

== History ==
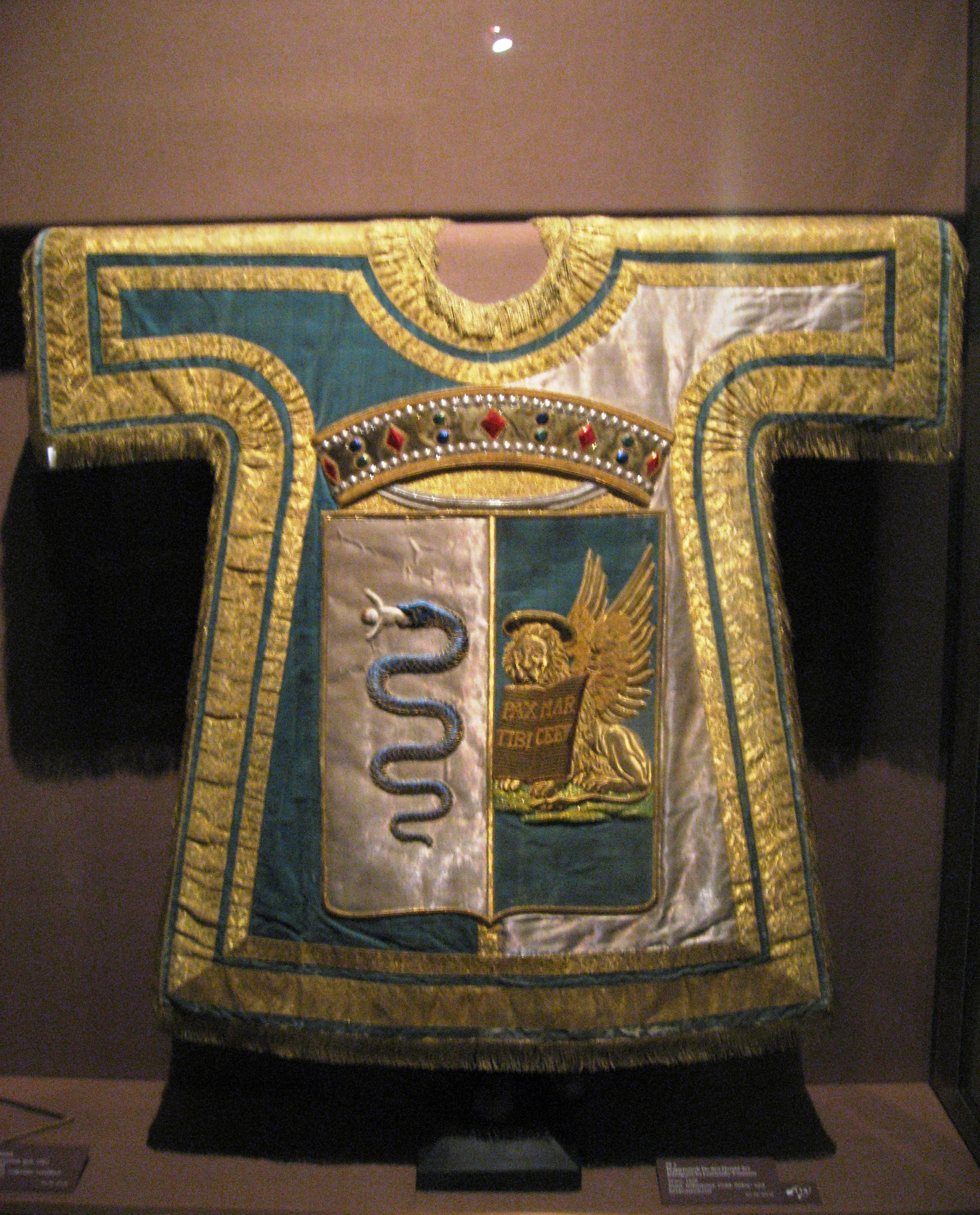
An Austrian herald's tabard (German: Wappenrock) with the coat of arms of Lombardy-Venetia (1834) – Imperial Treasury, Vienna

=== Creation ===
In the Treaty of Paris in 1814, the Austrians had confirmed their claims to the territories of the former Lombard Duchy of Milan, which had been ruled by the Habsburg monarchy since 1714 and together with the adjacent Duchy of Mantua by the Austrian branch of the dynasty from 1708 to 1796, and of the former Republic of Venice, which had been under Austrian rule intermittently upon the 1797 Treaty of Campo Formio.

The Congress of Vienna combined these lands into a single kingdom, ruled in personal union by the Habsburg Emperor of Austria; as distinct from the neighbouring Grand Duchy of Tuscany, the Duchy of Modena and Reggio as well as the Duchy of Parma, which remained independent entities under Habsburg rule. The Austrian emperor was represented day-to-day by viceroys appointed by the Imperial Court in Vienna and resident in Milan and Venice.

=== Years of the Kingdom ===
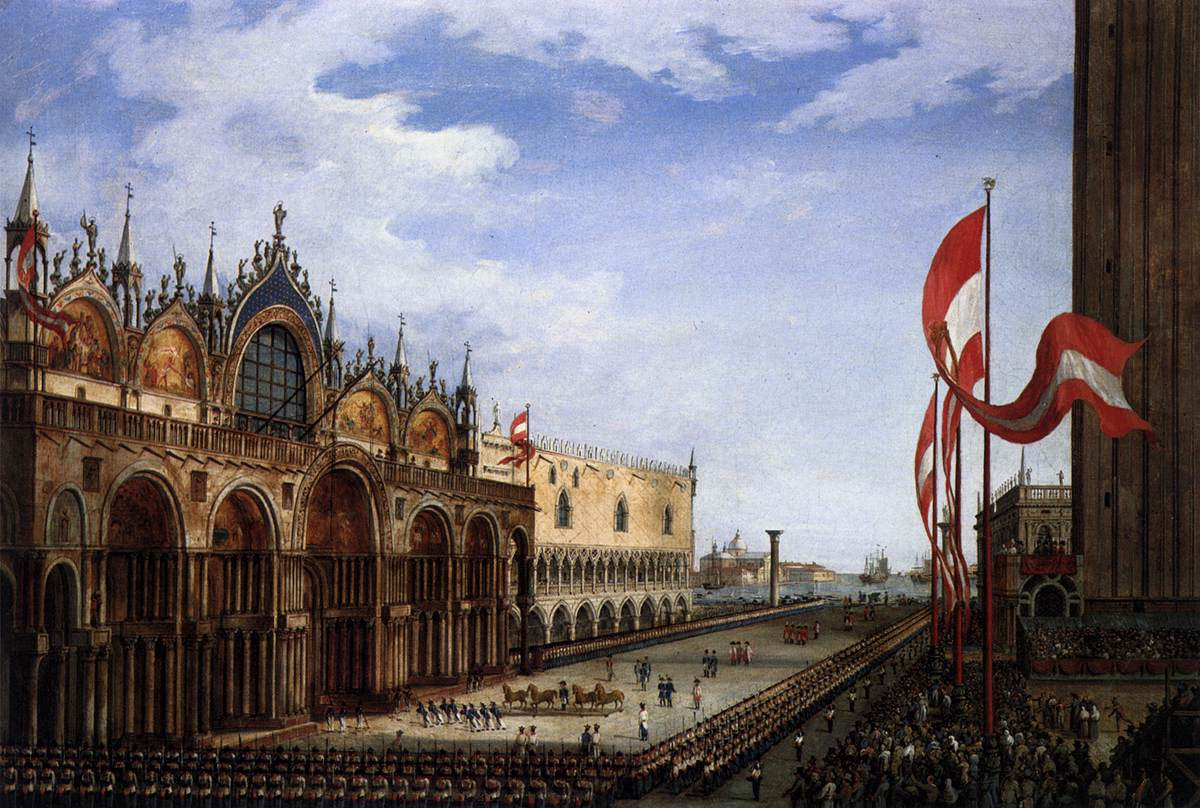
The Return of the Horses of San Marco by Vincenzo Chilone, 1815

The Kingdom of Lombardy–Venetia was first ruled by Emperor Francis I from 1815 until his death in 1835. His son Ferdinand I ruled from 1835 to 1848. In Milan on 6 September 1838, he became the last king to be crowned with the Iron Crown of Lombardy. The crown was subsequently brought to Vienna after the loss of Lombardy in 1859 but was restored to Italy after the loss of Venetia in 1866.

Though the local administration was Italian in language and staff, the Austrian authorities had to cope with the Italian unification (Italian: Risorgimento) movement. After a popular revolution on 22 March 1848, known as the "Five Days of Milan", the Austrians fled from Milan, which became the capital city of a Governo Provvisorio della Lombardia (Lombardy Provisional Government). The next day, Venice also rose against the Austrian rule, forming the Governo Provvisorio di Venezia (Venice Provisional Government). The Austrian forces under Field Marshal Joseph Radetzky, after defeating the Sardinian troops at the Battle of Custoza (24–25 July 1848), entered Milan (6 August) and Venice (24 August 1849), and once again restored Austrian rule.

Emperor Franz Joseph I of Austria ruled over the kingdom for the rest of its existence. The office of viceroy was abolished and replaced by a governor-general. The office was initially assumed by Field Marshal Radetzky — upon his retirement in 1857, it passed to Franz Joseph's younger brother Maximilian (who later became emperor of Mexico), who served as governor-general in Milan from 1857 to 1859.

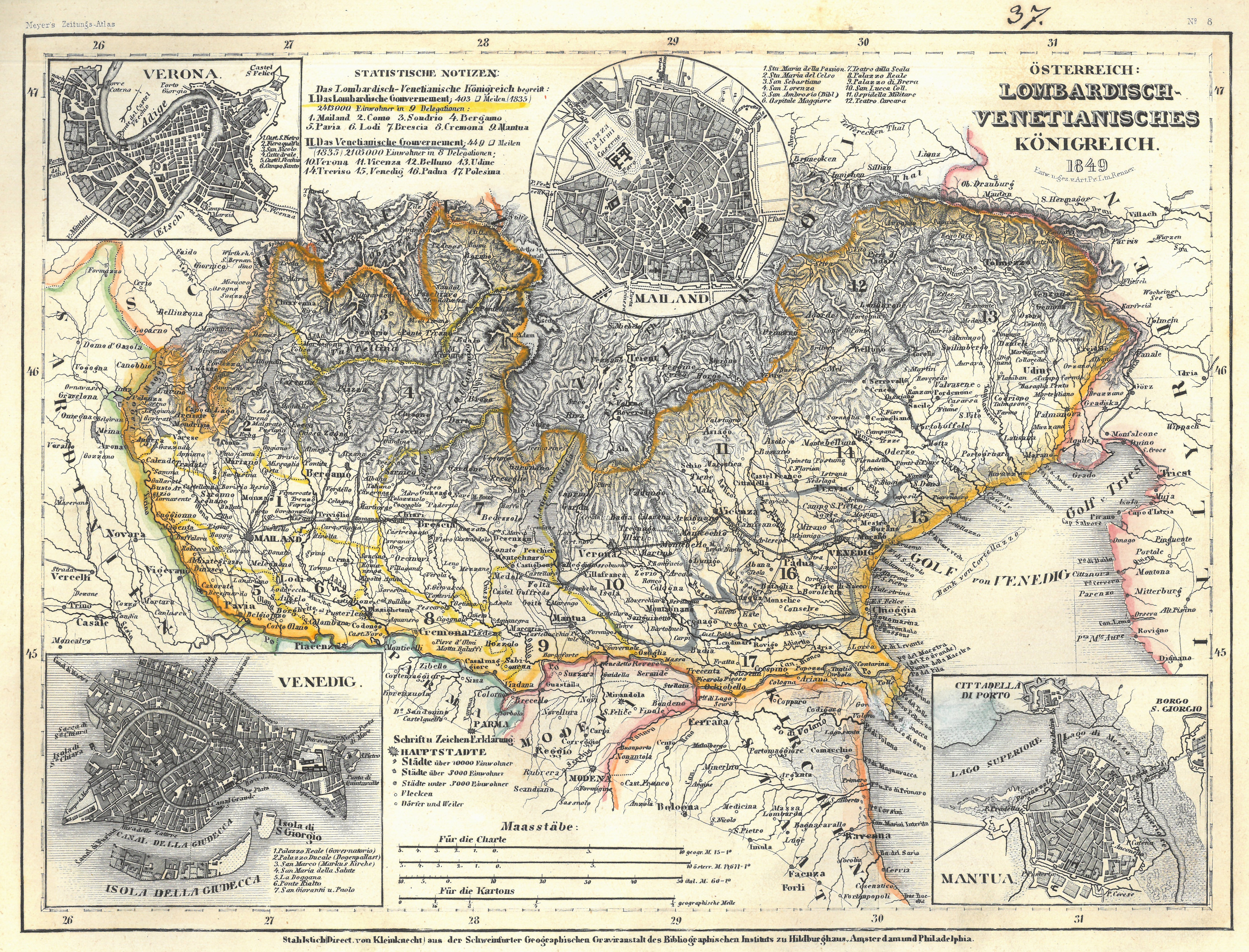
Lombardy–Venetia (1853) and its major cities

=== End of the Kingdom ===
After the Second Italian War of Independence and the defeat in the Battle of Solferino in 1859, Austria by the Treaty of Zurich had to cede Lombardy up to the Mincio River, except for the fortresses of Mantua and Peschiera, to the French Emperor Napoleon III, who immediately passed it to the Kingdom of Sardinia and the embryonic Italian state. Maximilian retired to Miramare Castle near Trieste, while the capital was relocated to Venice. However, remaining Venetia and Mantua likewise fell to the Kingdom of Italy in the aftermath of the Third Italian War of Independence, by the 1866 Peace of Prague. The territory of Venetia and Mantua was formally transferred from Austria to France, and then handed over to Italy on 19 October 1866, for diplomatic reasons; a plebiscite marked the Italian annexation on 21–22 October 1866.

== Administration ==
Administratively the Kingdom of Lombardy–Venetia comprised two independent governments (Gubernien) in its two parts, which officially were declared separate crown lands in 1851. Each part was further subdivided into several provinces, roughly corresponding with the départements of the Napoleonic Kingdom of Italy.

Lombardy included the provinces of Milan, Como, Bergamo, Brescia, Pavia, Cremona, Mantua, Lodi-Crema, and Sondrio. Venetia included the provinces of Venice, Verona, Padua, Vicenza, Treviso, Rovigo, Belluno, and Udine.

According to the Ethnographic map of Karl von Czoernig-Czernhausen, issued by the Imperial and Royal Administration of Statistics in 1855, the Kingdom of Lombardy–Venetia then had a population of 5,024,117 people, consisting of the following ethnic groups: 4,625,746 Italians (Lombard-Venetians); 351,805 Friulians; 12,084 Germans (Cimbrians in Venetia); 26,676 Slovenians; and 7,806 Jews.

For the first time since 1428, Lombardy reappeared as an entity, the first time in history that the term "Lombardy" was officially used to call specifically that entity and not for the whole of Northern Italy.

The administration used Italian as its language in its internal and external communications and documents, and the language's dominant position in politics, finance or jurisdiction was not questioned by the Austrian officials. The Italian-language Gazzetta di Milano was the official newspaper of the kingdom. Civil servants employed in the administration were predominantly Italian, with only about 10% of them being recruited from other regions of the Austrian Empire. Some bilingual Italian-German-speaking civil servants came from the neighbouring County of Tyrol. The German language, however, was the command language of the military, and top police officials were native German-speakers from other parts of the empire. The highest governorships were also reserved for Austrian aristocrats.

Austrian General Karl von Schönhals wrote in his memoirs that the Austrian administration enjoyed the support of the rural population and the middle class educated at the universities of Pavia and Padua, who were able to pursue careers in the administration.

Von Schönhals further noted that the Austrians mistrusted and refused the local aristocrats from high government offices, as they traditionally had rejected university education and had been able to gain leadership positions because of their family background. Consequently, the aristocrats saw themselves deprived of the possibility of establishing themselves in the management of society and supported the wars of independence against the Austrians.

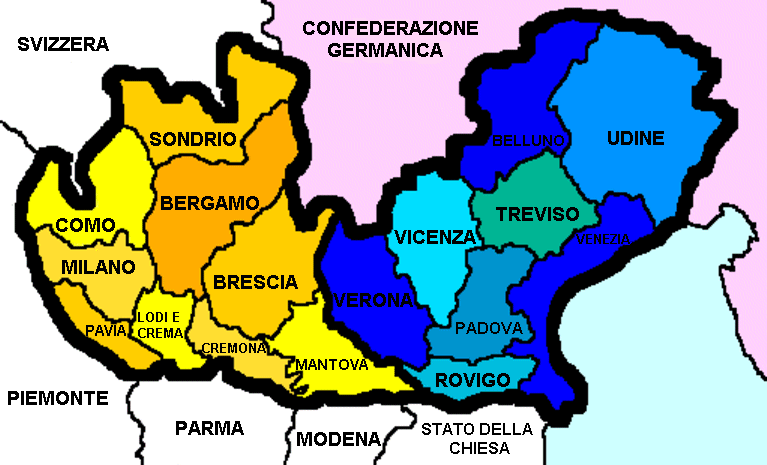
Provinces of Lombardy–Venetia

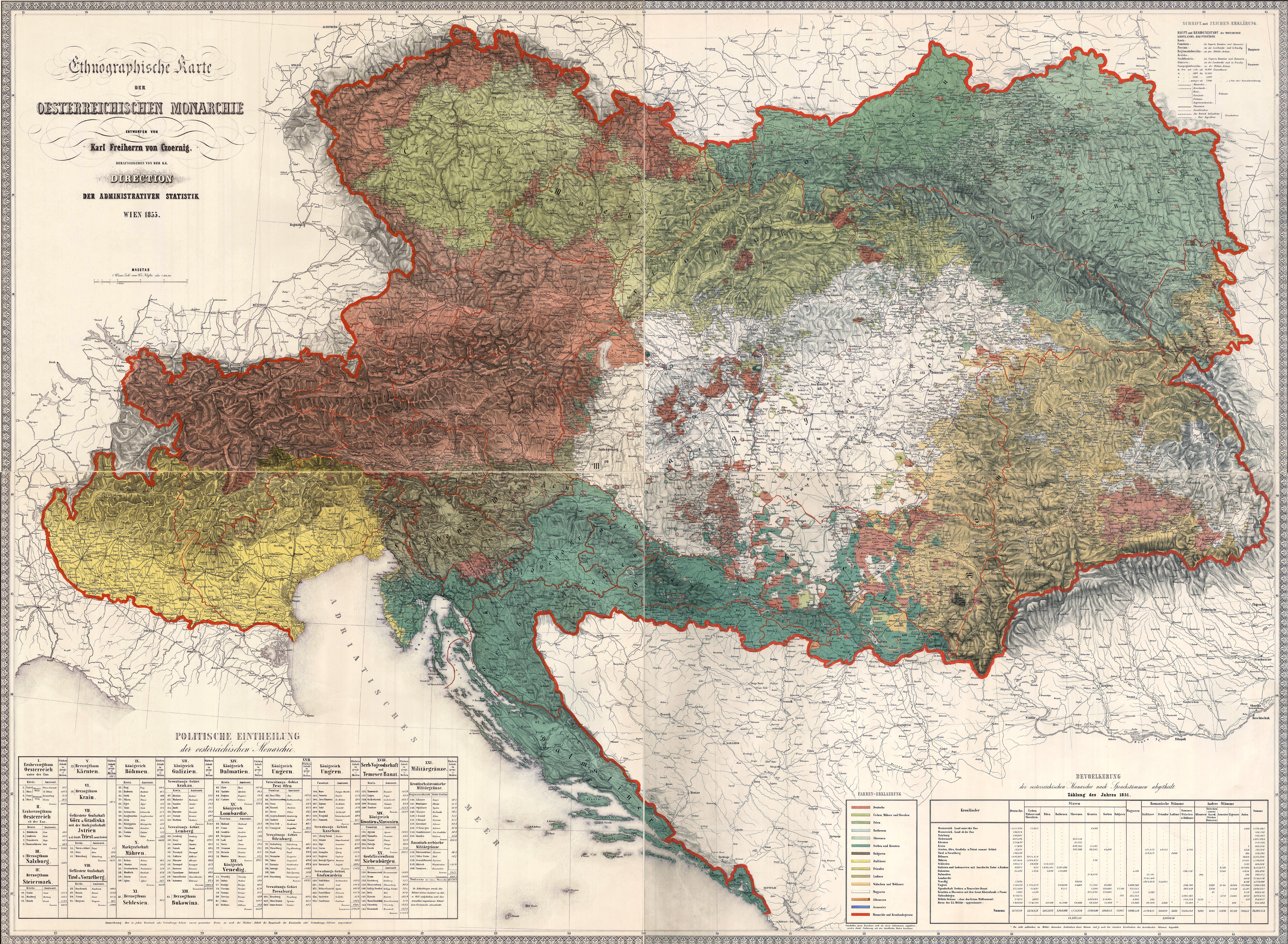
Ethnographic map of the Austrian Empire (1855) by Karl von Czoernig-Czernhausen

=== Kings ===
→				
King	Reign	Marriage(s) Issue	Succession right(s)	Viceroy(s)
Francis I (Francesco I); 1768–1835 (aged 67)	9 June 1815 – 2 March 1835	List: (1) Elisabeth of Württemberg (m. 1788; d. 1790) 1 children (Not survived to adulthood) (2) Maria Theresa of Naples and Sicily (m. 1790; d. 1807) 11 children (7 survived to adulthood) (3) Maria Ludovika of Austria-Este (m. 1808; d. 1816) Childless (4) Caroline Augusta of Bavaria (m. 1816; w. 1835) Childless	Son of Emperor Leopold II (primogeniture); Title granted by Congress of Vienna (1815)	1815–1816: Heinrich von Bellegarde
Francis I (Francesco I); 1768–1835 (aged 67)	9 June 1815 – 2 March 1835	List: (1) Elisabeth of Württemberg (m. 1788; d. 1790) 1 children (Not survived to adulthood) (2) Maria Theresa of Naples and Sicily (m. 1790; d. 1807) 11 children (7 survived to adulthood) (3) Maria Ludovika of Austria-Este (m. 1808; d. 1816) Childless (4) Caroline Augusta of Bavaria (m. 1816; w. 1835) Childless	Son of Emperor Leopold II (primogeniture); Title granted by Congress of Vienna (1815)	1816–1818: Anton Victor of Austria
Francis I (Francesco I); 1768–1835 (aged 67)	9 June 1815 – 2 March 1835	List: (1) Elisabeth of Württemberg (m. 1788; d. 1790) 1 children (Not survived to adulthood) (2) Maria Theresa of Naples and Sicily (m. 1790; d. 1807) 11 children (7 survived to adulthood) (3) Maria Ludovika of Austria-Este (m. 1808; d. 1816) Childless (4) Caroline Augusta of Bavaria (m. 1816; w. 1835) Childless	Son of Emperor Leopold II (primogeniture); Title granted by Congress of Vienna (1815)	1818–1848: Rainer Joseph of Austria
Ferdinand I (Ferdinando I); 1793–1875 (aged 82)	2 March 1835 – 2 December 1848 (Abdicated due to 1848 revolutions)	Maria Anna of Savoy (m. 1831; w. 1875); Childless	Son of King Francis I (primogeniture)	1818–1848: Rainer Joseph of Austria
Franz Joseph I (Francesco Giuseppe I); 1830–1916 (aged 86)	2 December 1848 – 12 October 1866 (Forced to cede Lombardy and Venetia)	Elisabeth of Bavaria (m. 1854; d. 1898); 4 children (3 survived to adulthood)	Grandson of King Francis I; Eldest son of Ferdinand I's only surviving younger brother (blood proximity)	1848–1857: Joseph Radetzky
Franz Joseph I (Francesco Giuseppe I); 1830–1916 (aged 86)	2 December 1848 – 12 October 1866 (Forced to cede Lombardy and Venetia)	Elisabeth of Bavaria (m. 1854; d. 1898); 4 children (3 survived to adulthood)	Grandson of King Francis I; Eldest son of Ferdinand I's only surviving younger brother (blood proximity)	1857–1859: Maximilian of Austria
Franz Joseph I (Francesco Giuseppe I); 1830–1916 (aged 86)	2 December 1848 – 12 October 1866 (Forced to cede Lombardy and Venetia)	Elisabeth of Bavaria (m. 1854; d. 1898); 4 children (3 survived to adulthood)	Grandson of King Francis I; Eldest son of Ferdinand I's only surviving younger brother (blood proximity)	1859: Ferenc Gyulay

=== Governors of Lombardy ===
- Heinrich Johann Bellegarde 1814–1816
- Franz Josef Graf Sauru 1816–1818
- Giulio Strassoldo di Sotto 1818–1830
- Franz von Hartig 1830–1840
- Robert von Salm-Reifferscheidt-Raitz 1840–1841
- Johann Baptist Spaur 1841–1848
- Maximilian Karl Lamoral O'Donnell 1848 (acting)
- Felix von Schwarzenberg 1848
- Franz Wimpffen 1848 (acting)
- Alberto Montecuccoli-Laderchi 1848–1849 (acting)
- Karl Borromäus Philipp zu Schwarzenberg 1849–1850 (acting)
- Michele Strassoldo-Grafenberg 1851–1857 (with the title of Lieutenant of Lombardy)
- Friedrich von Burger 1857–1859

=== Governors of Venetia ===
- Peter Goëss 1815–1819
- Ferdinand Ernst Maria von Bissingen-Nippenburg 1819–1820
- Carlo d'Inzaghi 1820–1826
- Johann Baptist Spaur 1826–1840
- Aloys Pálffy de Erdöd 1840–1848
- Ferdinand Zichy zu Zich von Vasonykeöy 1848 (acting)
- Laval Nugent von Westmeath 1848–1849 (military governor)
- Karl von Gorzowsky 1849
- Stanislaus Anton Puchner 1849–1850
- Georg Otto von Toggenburg-Sargans 1850–1855
- Kajetan von Bissingen-Nippenburg 1855–1860
- Georg Otto von Toggenburg-Sargans 1860–1866 (second time)

=== Flags and Coats of Arms ===
Official Flag of the Kingdom of Lombardy–Venetia (1815–1866)

1815–1866

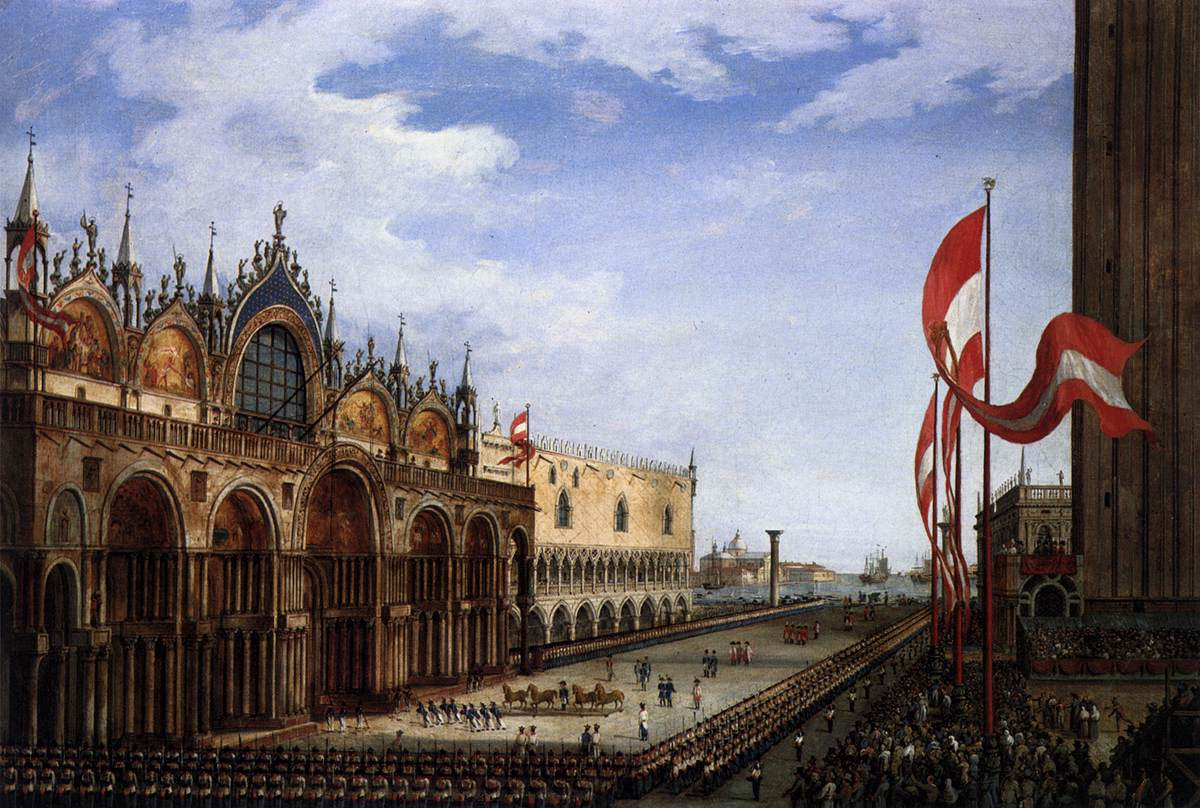
1815

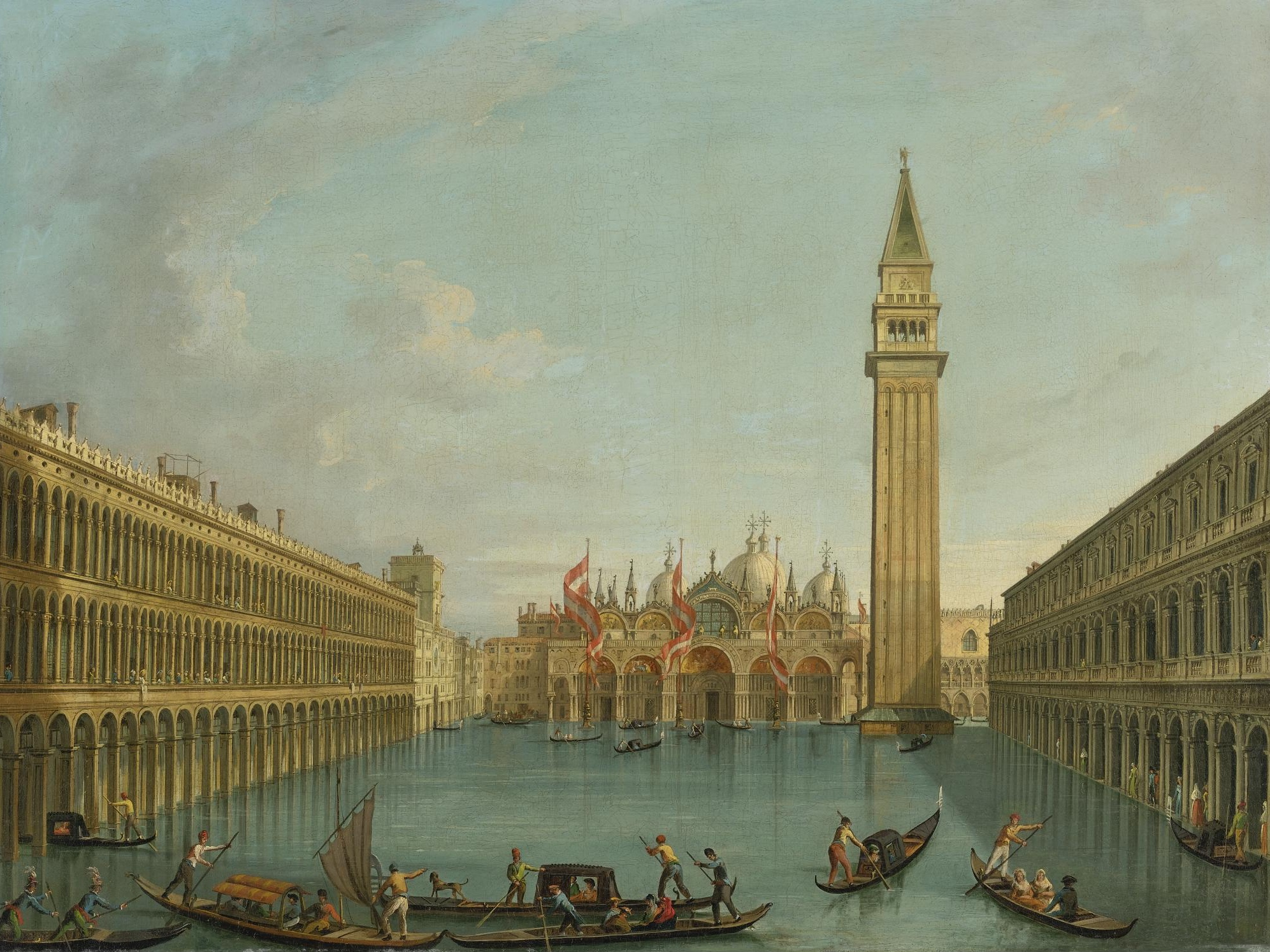
1825

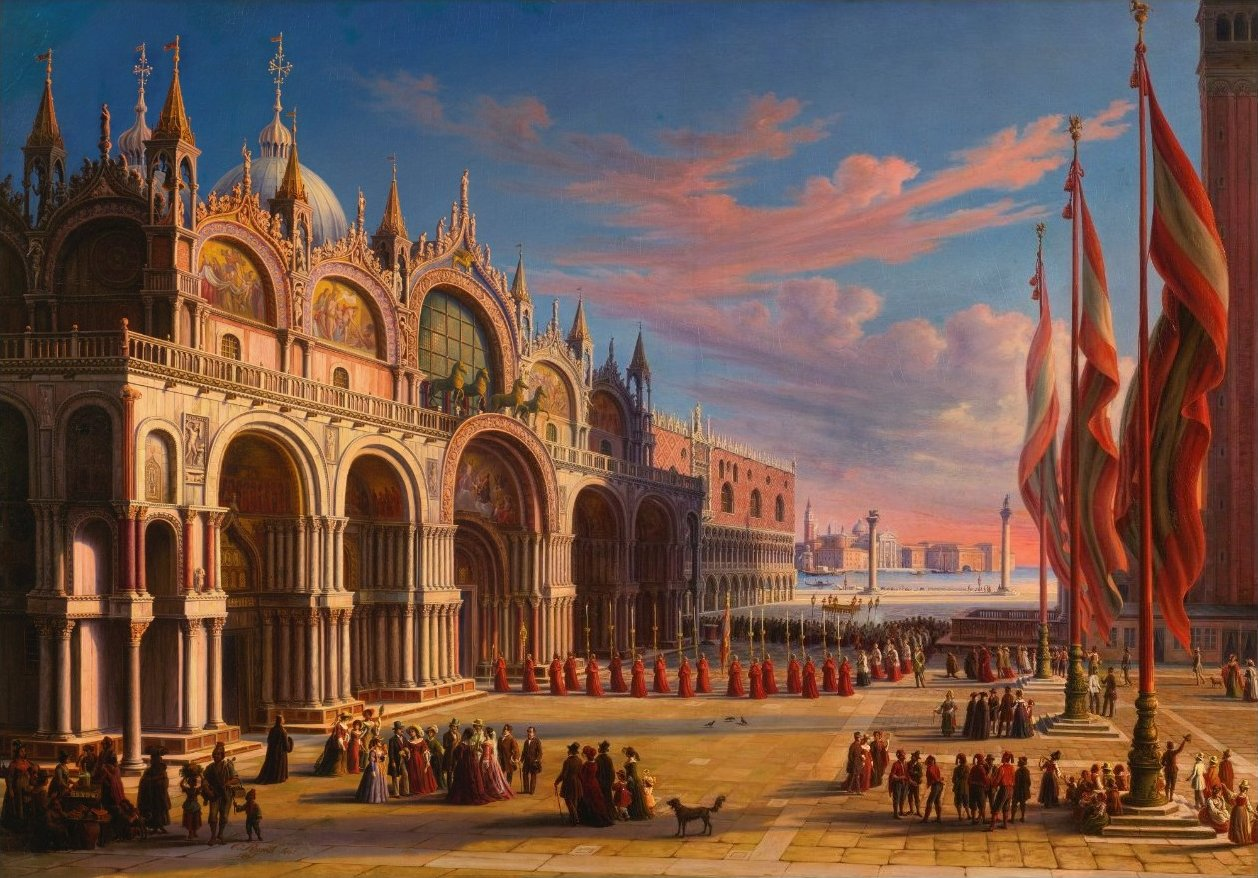
1850
Coats of Arms of the Kingdom of Lombardy–Venetia (1815–1866)

Lesser coat of arms

Middle coat of arms

Greater coat of arms
