= Horses of Saint Mark =

Ancient bronze horse statues in Venice

Coordinates: 45°26′4.17″N 12°20′21.73″E

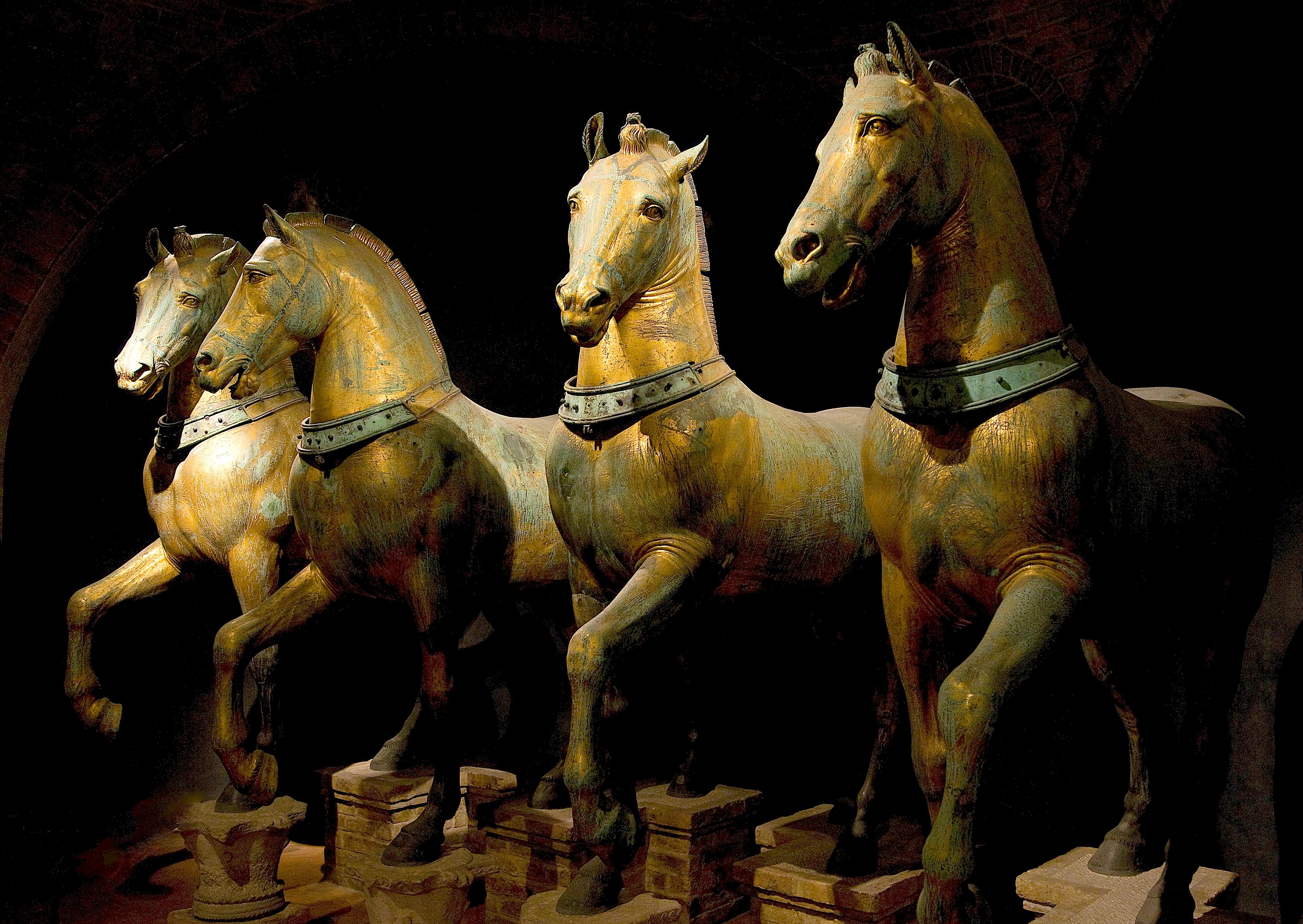
The original Horses inside the St Mark's Basilica

The Horses of Saint Mark (Italian: Cavalli di San Marco), also known as the Triumphal Quadriga or the Horses of the Hippodrome of Constantinople, are a group of ancient bronze statues of four horses that originally formed part of a monument depicting a quadriga — a four-horse chariot used in chariot racing and Roman triumphs.

The horses were placed on the façade, on the loggia above the porch, of St Mark's Basilica in Venice, northern Italy, after the sack of Constantinople in 1204. They remained there until they were looted by Napoleon in 1797, but were returned in his final defeat in 1815. The original sculptures have since been moved indoors for conservation, with replicas now occupying their former position on the loggia.

== Origins ==
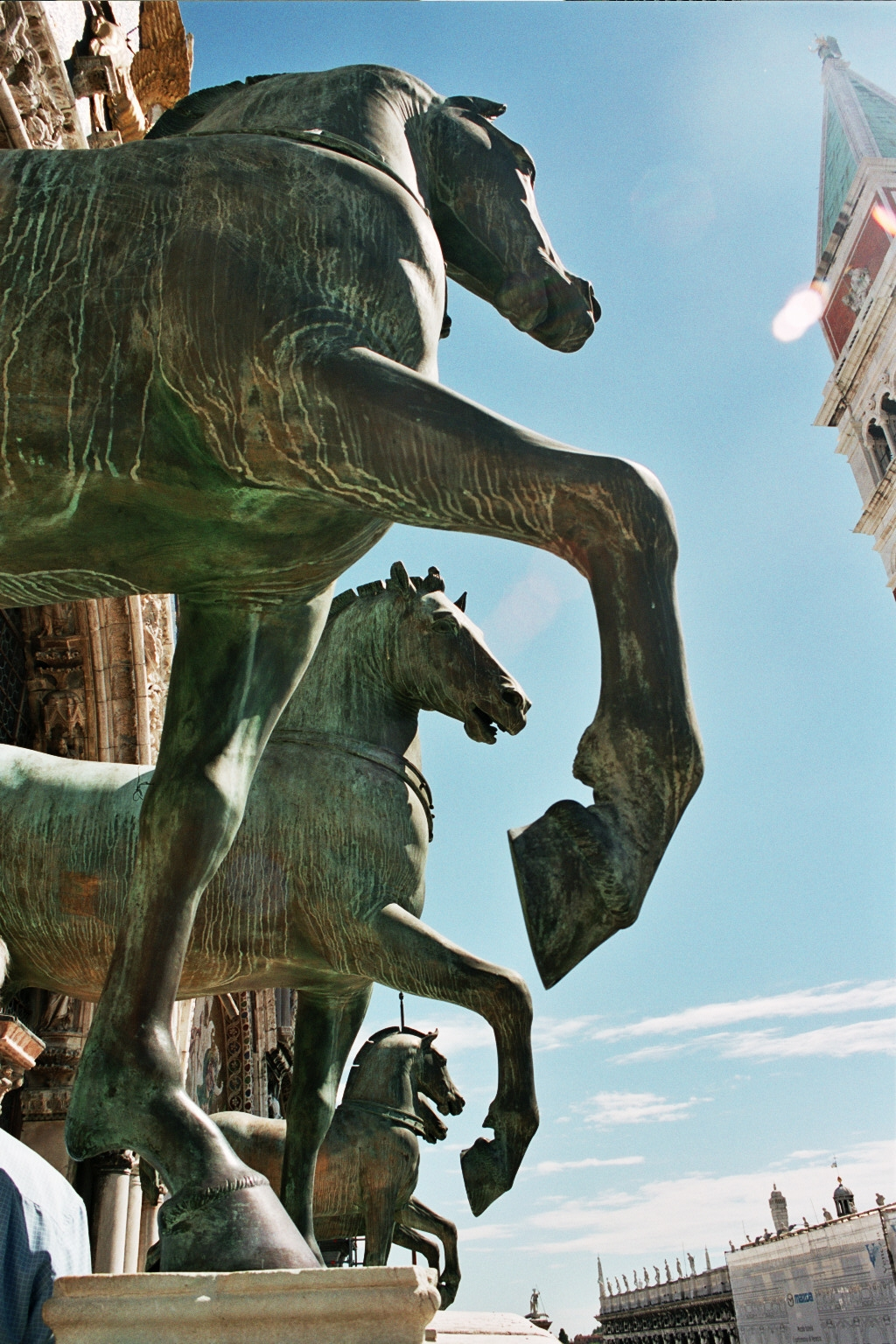
The replica Horses of Saint Mark

The sculptures date from classical antiquity. Many scholars believe they were sculpted in the 2nd or 3rd century AD, noting similarities to the Equestrian Statue of Marcus Aurelius in Rome (c. 175 AD). But some say the evident technical expertise and naturalistic rendering of the animals suggest they were made in Classical Greece of the 5th and 4th centuries BC.

In light of their short backs and long legs, it has been argued that they were originally situated above the eye line, probably created to top a triumphal arch or some other grand building. Perhaps commissioned by the Emperor Septimius Severus, they may originally have been made for the Eastern capital of Constantinople, where they were long displayed.

Analysis suggests that the sculptures are at least 96.67% copper, and therefore should be viewed not as made from bronze but of an impure copper. The relatively low tin content increased the casting temperature to 1200–1300 °C.

== History ==
The horses, along with the quadriga with which they were depicted, were long displayed at the Hippodrome of Constantinople; they may be the "four gilt horses that stand above the Hippodrome" that "came from the island of Chios under Theodosius II" mentioned in the 8th- or early 9th-century Parastaseis syntomoi chronikai. As part of the sack of the capital of the Byzantine Empire in the Fourth Crusade, they were looted by Venetian forces in 1204. That same year, the collars on the four horses were added to obscure where the animals' heads had been severed to allow them to be transported from Constantinople to Venice. Shortly after the Fourth Crusade, Doge Enrico Dandolo sent the horses to Venice, where they were installed on the terrace of the façade of St Mark's Basilica in 1254. Petrarch admired them there.

In 1797, Napoleon had the horses forcibly removed from the basilica and carried off to Paris, where they were used in the design of the Arc de Triomphe du Carrousel together with a quadriga.

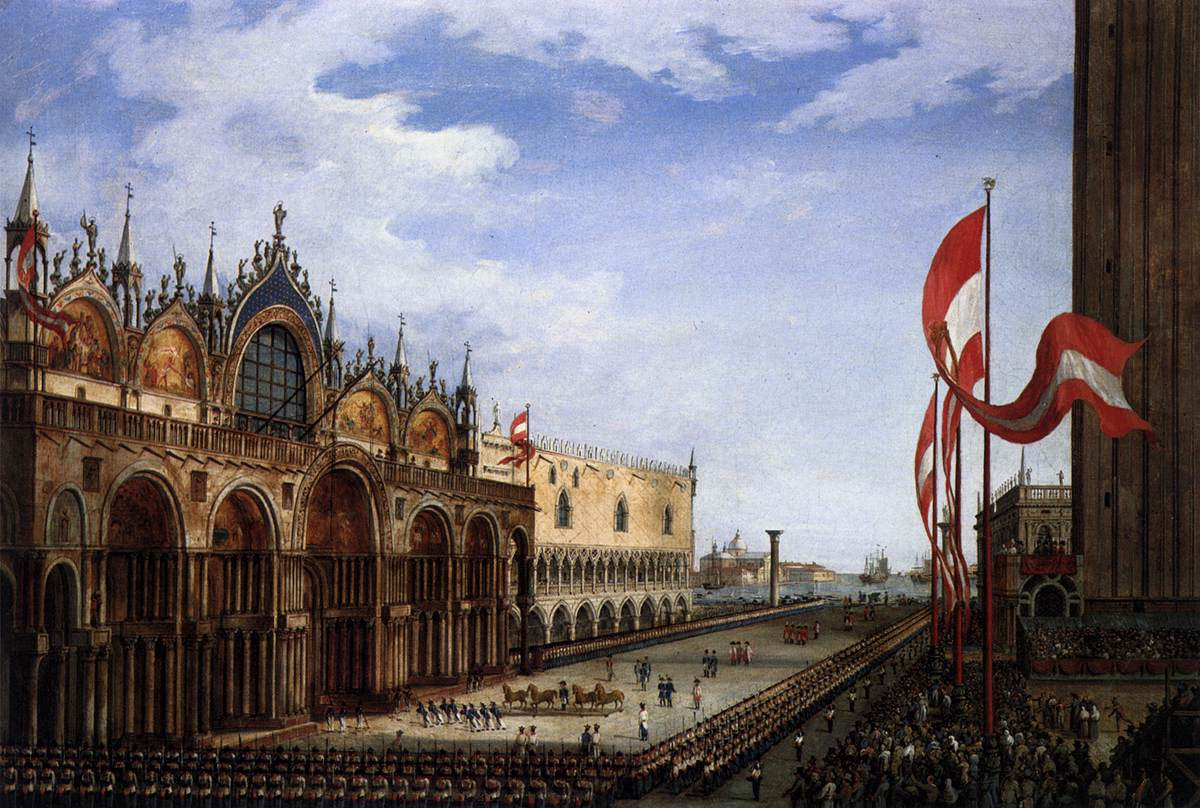
The Return of the Horses of San Marco by Vincenzo Chilone, depicting the return of the horses from France in 1815.

In 1815, following the final defeat of Napoleon, the horses were returned to Venice by Captain Dumaresq. He had fought at the Battle of Waterloo and was with the Coalition forces in Paris where he was selected, by the Emperor of Austria, to take the horses down from the Arc de Triomphe du Carrousel and return them to St Mark's in Venice. For the skillful manner in which he performed this work, the Emperor gave him a gold snuff box with his initials in diamonds on the lid.

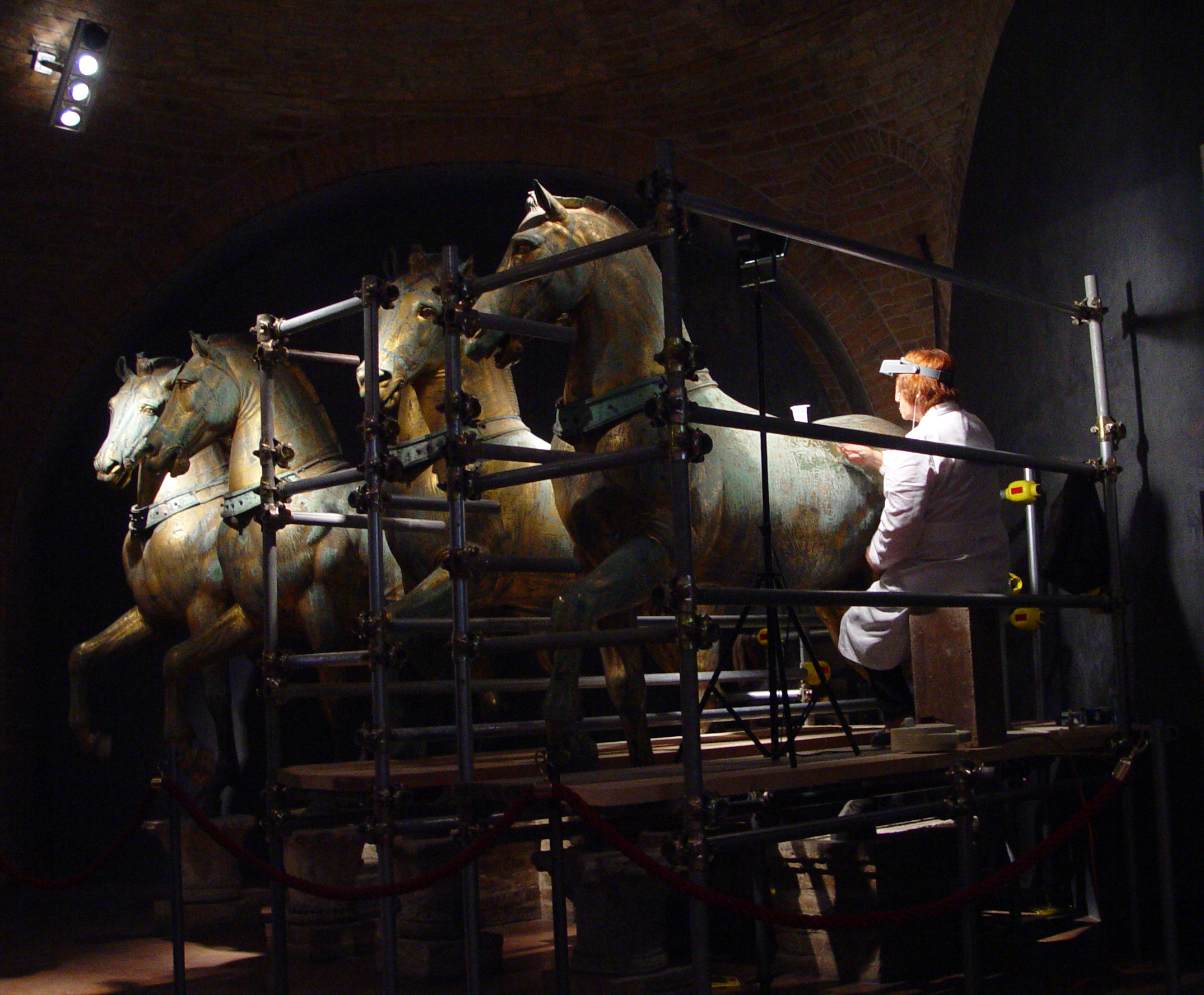
Conservation-restoration of the Horses of Saint Mark

The horses remained in place over St Mark's until the early 1980s, when damage from air pollution led them to be removed and put on display inside the basilica. They were replaced on the loggia with replicas.

== Image gallery ==
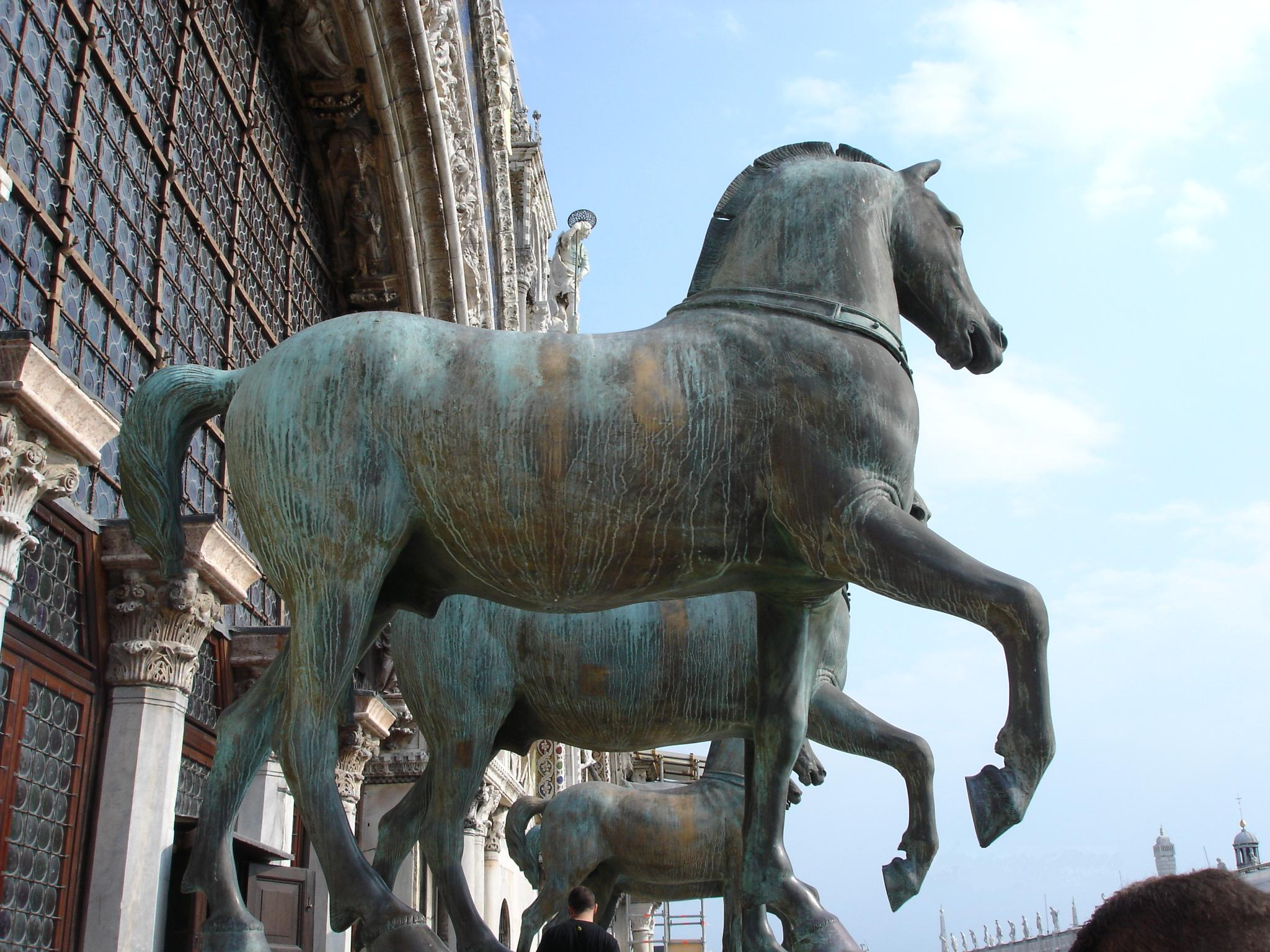
Side view, replicas

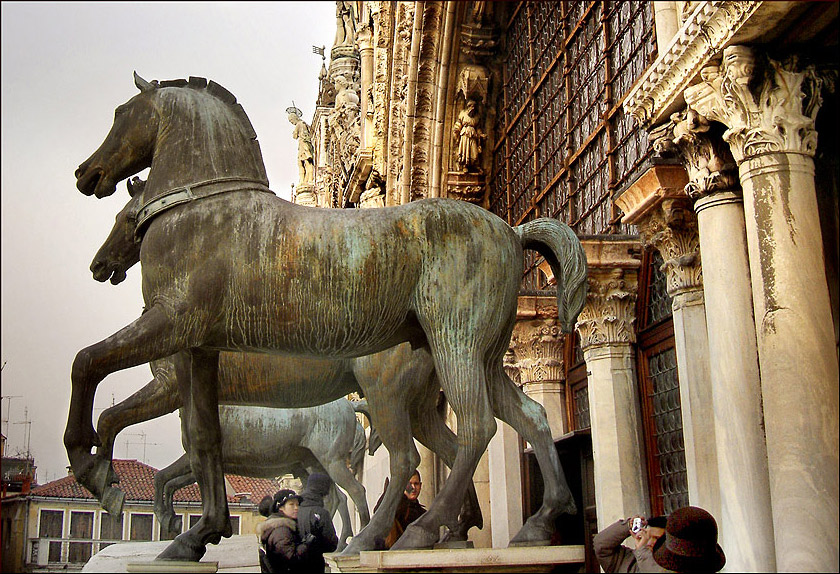
Side view, replicas

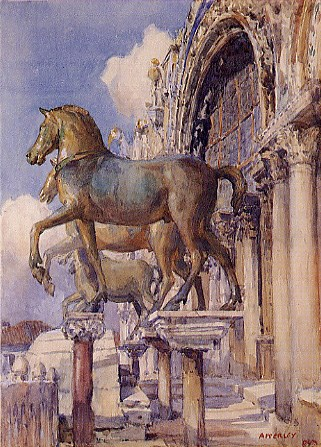
Painting by George Owen Wynne Apperley (1905)

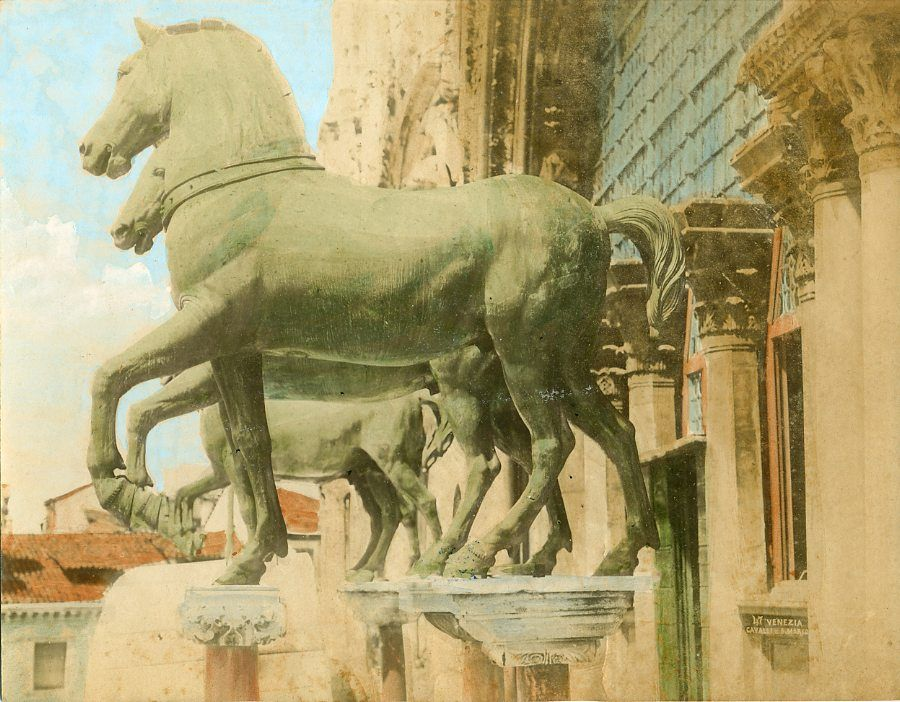
Colorized photograph by Carlo Naya

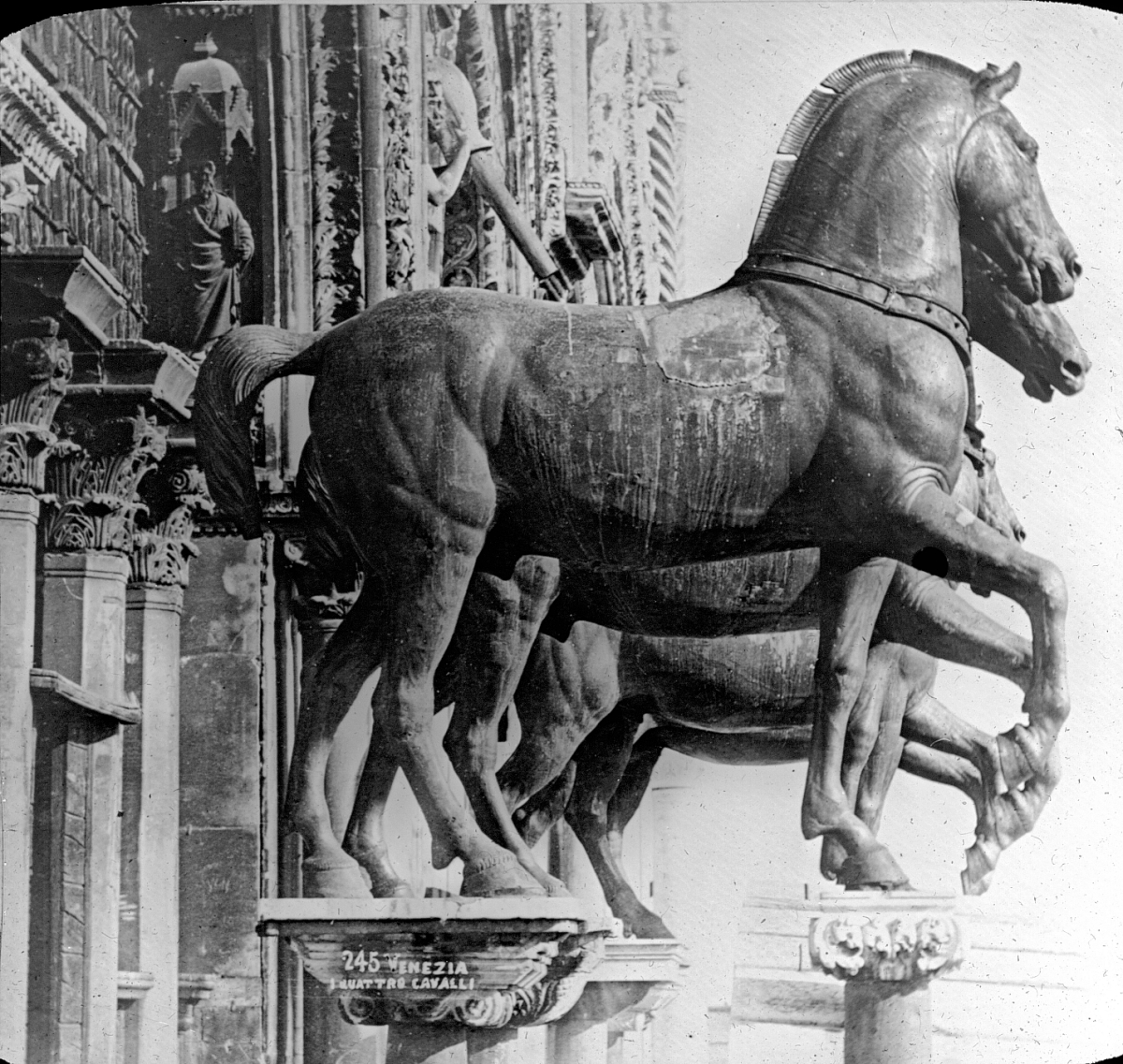
Black and white photo

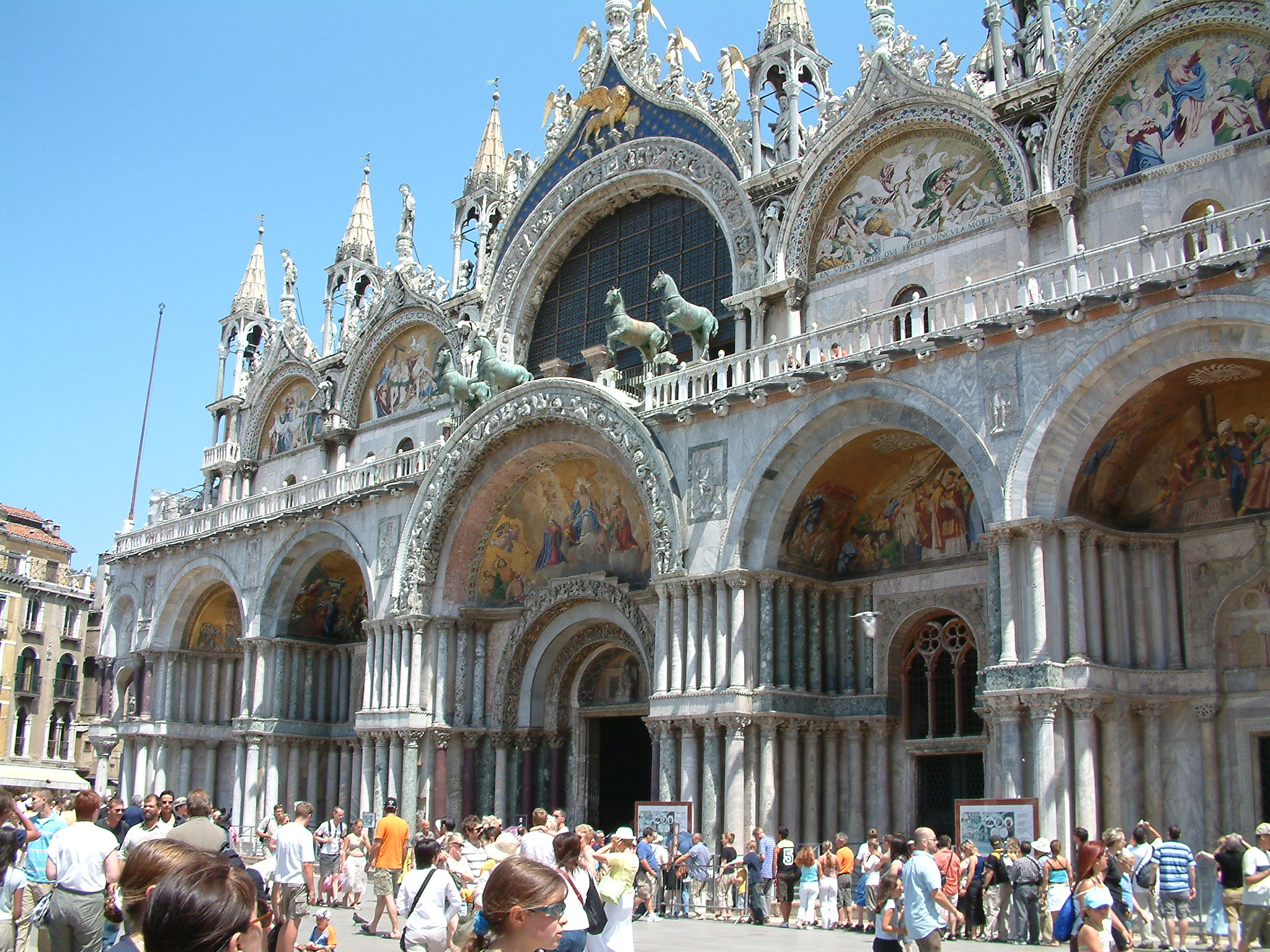
façade of St Mark's Basilica, replicas

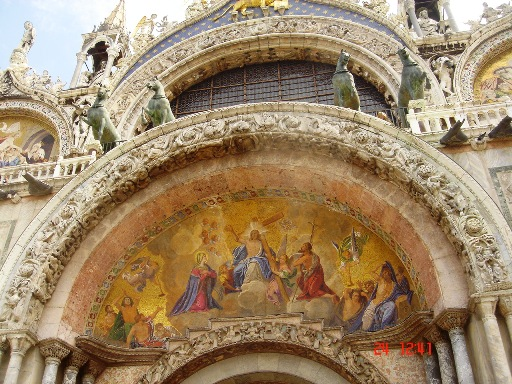
View from below, replicas

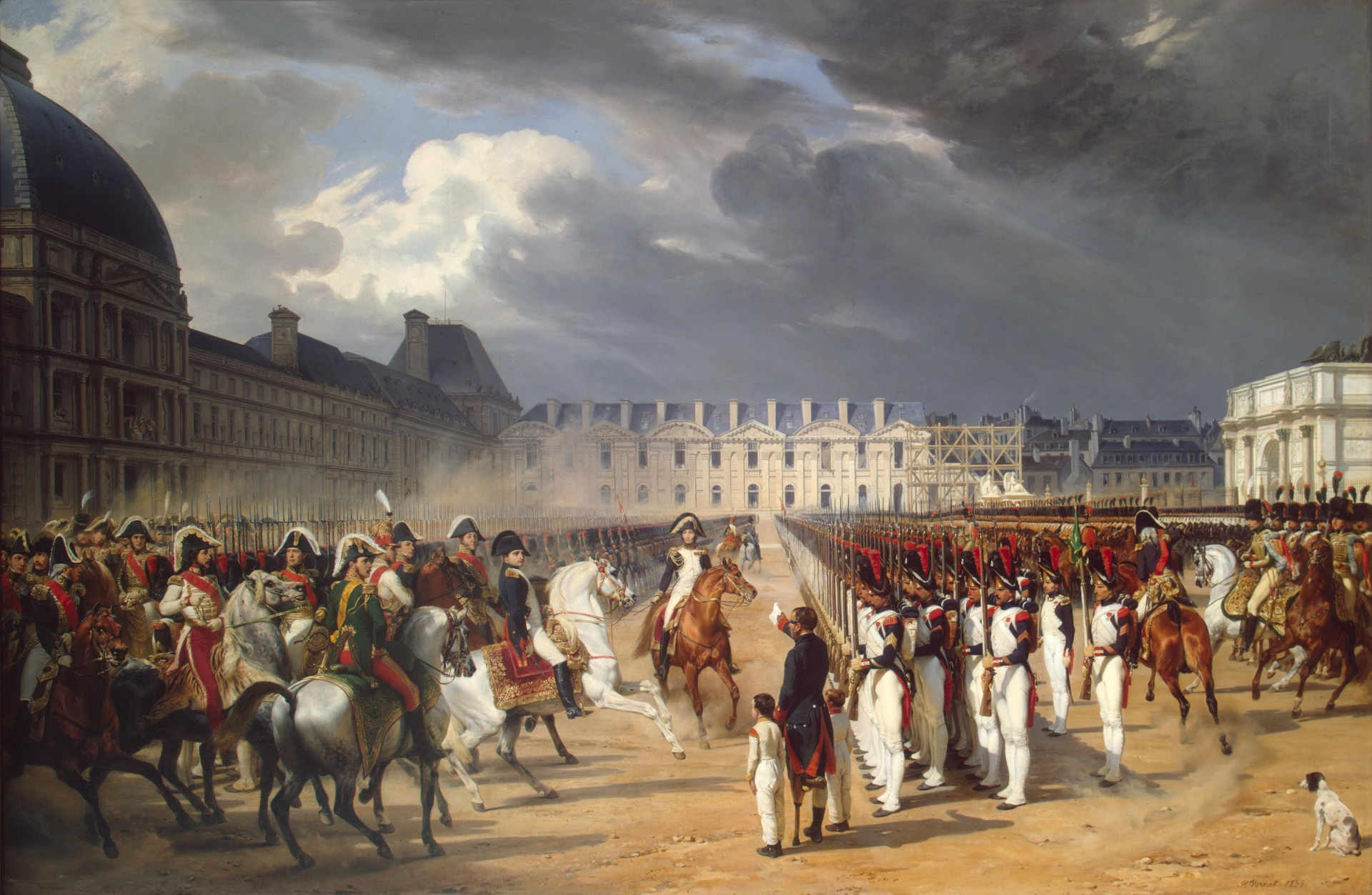
Napoleon at the Tuileries by Horace Vernet. The Horse of Saint Mark, then in Paris, visible on the right.
