= The Return of the Horses of San Marco =

Painting by Vincenzo Chilone

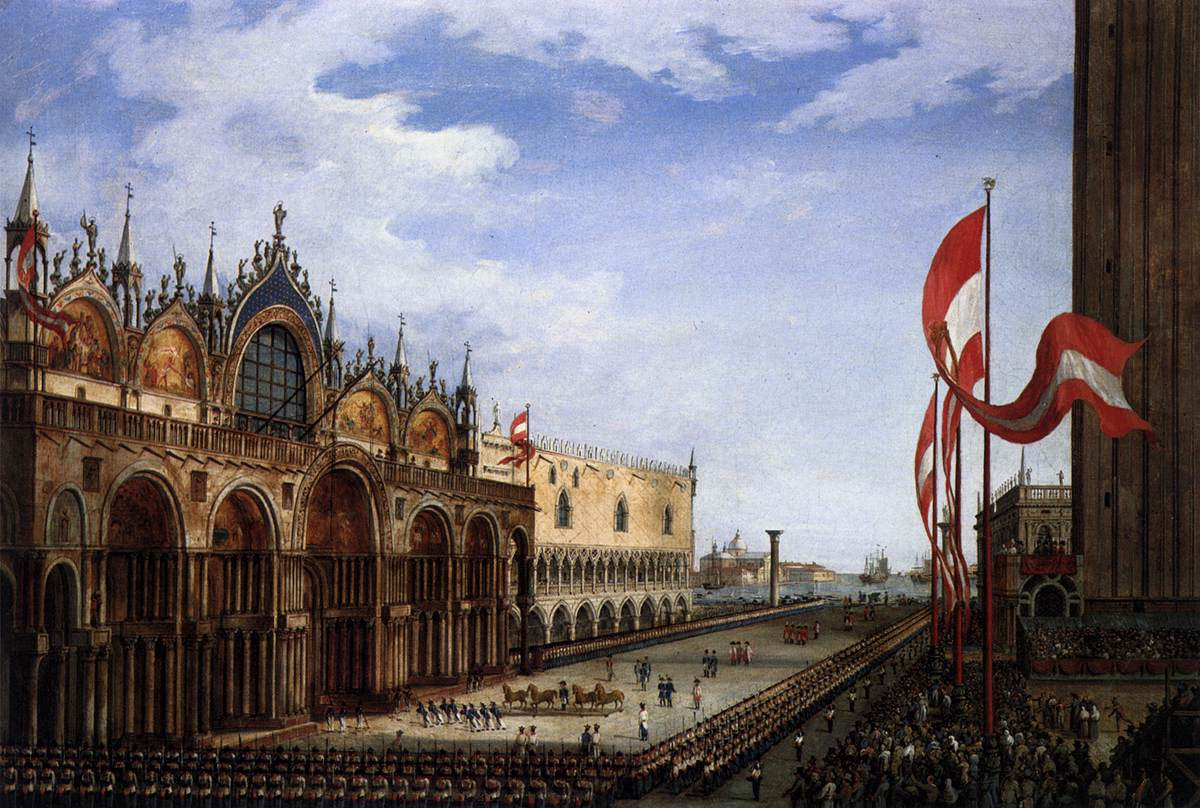
- Artist: Vincenzo Chilone
- Year: 1815
- Type: Oil on canvas, history painting
- Dimensions: 60 cm × 85 cm (24 in × 33 in)
- Location: Private Collection

The Return of the Horses of San Marco is an 1815 history painting by the Italian artist Vincenzo Chilone. It depicts the return of the Horses of Saint Mark to the city of Venice the same year. The four bronze statues dated back to classical antiquity and had been in Venice since 1204. In 1797 Napoleon invaded and dissolved the Republic of Venice, taking the Horses of Saint Mark as war booty to France. From 1807 they were displayed on top of the new Arc de Triomphe du Carrousel in Paris.

Following the first defeat of Napoleon, the Congress of Vienna awarded Venice to the Austrian Empire as part of the Kingdom of Lombardy–Venetia. After Napoleon's final defeat during the Hundred Days campaign, Paris was again occupied by the Allies and looted art treasures in the Louvre and elsewhere were returned to their original owners. Austria oversaw the restoration of the Horses to Venice in a grand ceremony. Chilone was a Venetian painter known for producing cityscapes in the style of the vedute of Canaletto. The painting displays the Piazza San Marco with Austrian troops on parade and civilians spectators off to the right.

== Bibliography ==
- De Grummond, Nancy Thomson. Encyclopedia of the History of Classical Archaeology. Routledge, 11 May 2015
- Keates, Jonathan. La Serenissima: The Story of Venice. Bloomsbury Publishing, 2022.
- Plant, Margaret. Venice: Fragile City, 1797-1997. Yale University Press, 2002.
- Rosenthal, Gertrude. Italian Paintings, XIV-XVIIIth Centuries, from the Collection of the Baltimore Museum of Art. Baltimore Museum of Art, 1981.
