= Napoleon at the Tuileries =

1838 painting by Horace Vernet

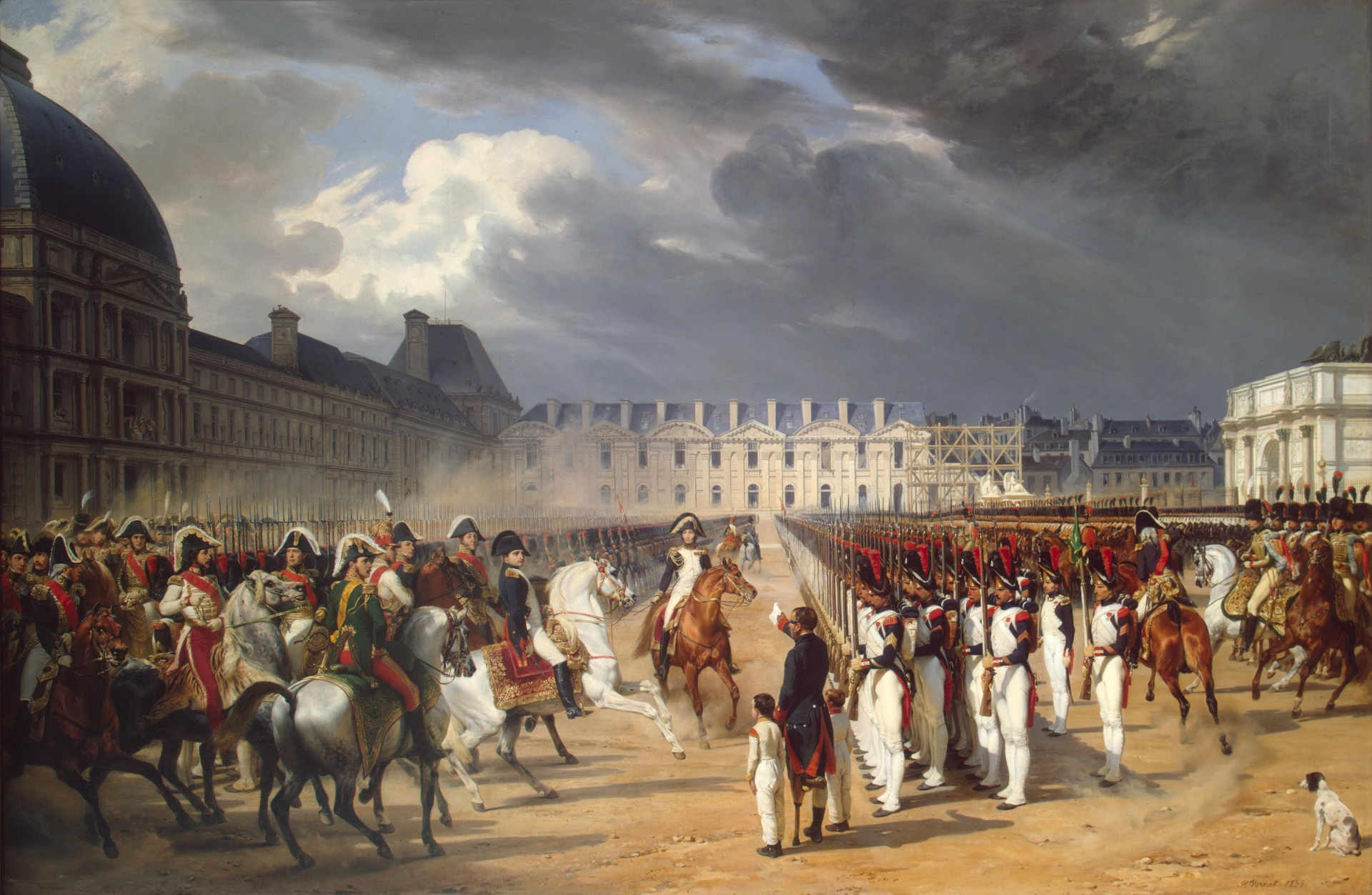
- Artist: Horace Vernet
- Year: 1838
- Type: Oil on canvas, history painting
- Dimensions: 215 cm × 326 cm (85 in × 128 in)
- Location: Hermitage Museum, Saint Petersburg

Napoleon at the Tuileries (French: Napoléon aux Tuileries) is an 1838 history painting by the French artist Horace Vernet. It depicts Napoleon, Emperor of France, inspecting a parade of the Imperial Guard in the Place du Carrousel outside the Tuileries Palace in Paris around 1808. He is approached by a wounded veteran holding out a petition. Amongst the officers accompanying the Emperor are Eugène de Beauharnais, Joachim Murat, Michel Ney, Jean-Andoche Junot and Géraud Duroc. The Horses of Saint Mark, looted from Venice but later returned in 1815, can be seen on the right.

The original painting is in the Hermitage Museum in Saint Petersburg having been acquired from the artist by Nicholas I. A copy is in the Wallace Collection in London.

== Bibliography ==
- Duffy, Stephen. The Wallace Collection. Scala, 2005.
- Kostenovich, Albert. French Art Treasures at the Hermitage. Harry N. Abrams, 1999.
- Neverov, Oleg & Piotrovskiĭ, Mikhail Borisovich. The Hermitage: Essays on the History of the Collection. Slavia Art Books, 1997.
