= Vincenzo Chilone =

Italian painter (1758–1839)

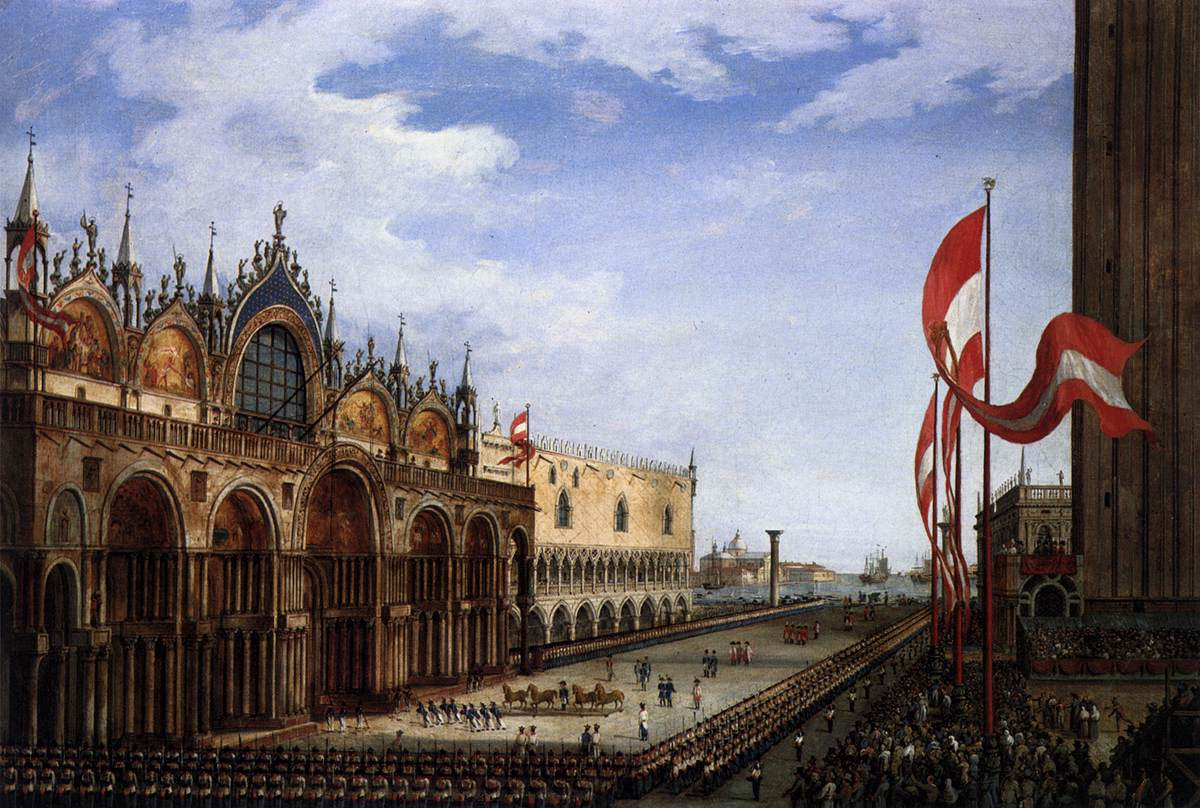
The Return of the Horses of San Marco (1815)

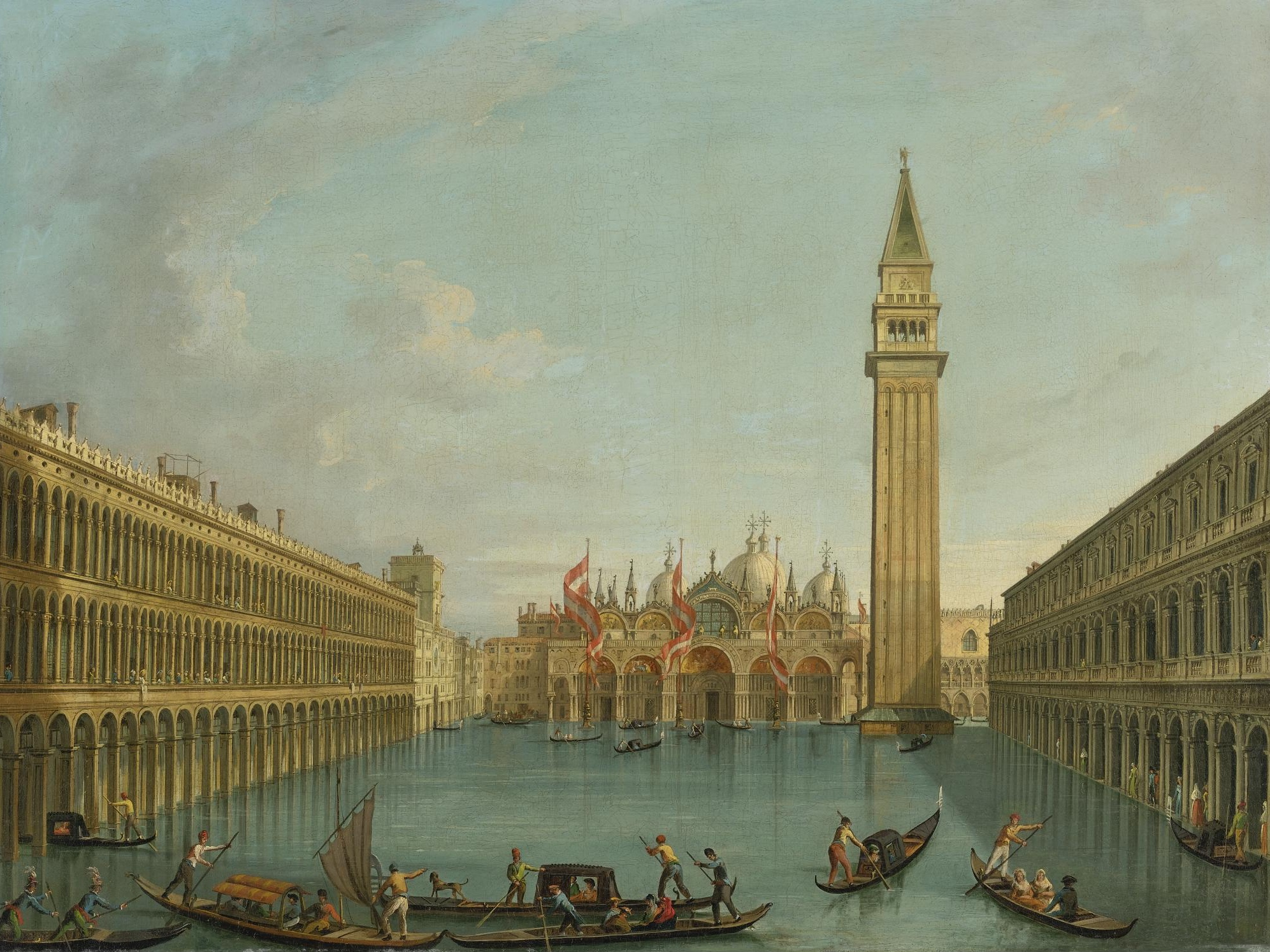
The Piazza di San Marco, Flooded (1825)

Vincenzo Chilone (10 July 1758, Venice – 12 January 1839, Venice) was an Italian painter who specialized in vedute, after the style of Canaletto.

== Biography ==
He was born into a poor family and lost his father at the age of two. When he was twelve, he worked as a maker of silk stockings. Later, he was apprenticed to a woodcarver. His neighbor there turned out to be a student of Francesco Battaglioli. Chilone was introduced to him and accepted into his school.

Economic needs and family misfortunes led him to become an assistant to Alessandro Mauro, a theater architect, and set designer. All of his work was done without credit. After Mauro's death, he tried briefly to work on his own but eventually accepted a position in Udine, collaborating with Antonio Mauro, to do the frescoes at a theater being decorated by the painter Giambattista Canal, whose eyesight was failing. He remained in Udine for some time and helped decorate the Palazzo Marcotti.

He returned to Venice in 1815, virtually forgotten, and was forced to work for other painters. Most of his canvases were sold cheaply to middlemen, some of whom made a huge profit by passing them off as works by Canaletto. Perhaps in response to this, he began to display more stylistic autonomy. Soon, he enjoyed the patronage of the nobility. In 1824, he was elected a member of the Accademia di Belle Arti di Venezia. That same year, he received a major commission from the expatriate Venetian musician, Domenico Dragonetti, who was also an art collector and dealer. Despite having this degree of success, he apparently died in poverty.
