= 1909 in Italy =

- Decades: 1880s; 1890s; 1900s; 1910s; 1920s
- See also: History of Italy; Timeline of Italian history; List of years in Italy

Events from the year 1909 in Italy.

== Kingdom of Italy ==
- Monarch – Victor Emmanuel III (1900–1946)
- Prime minister –
  1. Giovanni Giolitti (1906–1909)
  2. Sidney Sonnino (1909–1910)
- Population – 34,455,000

== Events ==
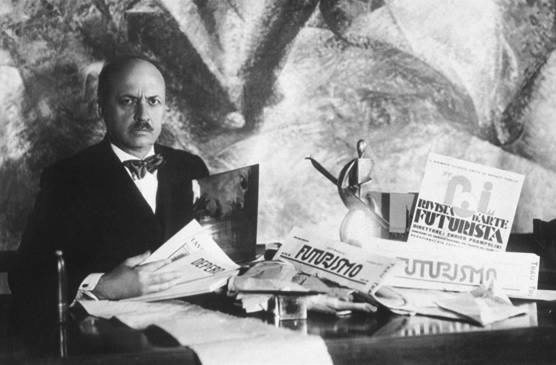
Filippo Tommaso Marinetti, author of the Futurist Manifesto

The poet Filippo Tommaso Marinetti publishes the Manifesto of Futurism (Italian: Manifesto del Futurismo) and initiates an artistic philosophy, Futurism, rejecting the past, and celebrating speed, machinery, violence, youth and industry; it also advocates the modernization and cultural rejuvenation of Italy. In February 1909 the manifesto was published in one of Europe's main newspapers, Le Figaro.

=== January ===
The government struggles to get relief aid to Messina and Calabria after the earthquake on December 28, 1908.

=== March ===
- March 7 – First round of the Italian general election.
- March 12 – New York City police lieutenant Joseph Petrosino, on a secret mission in Italy, is killed by the Sicilian Mafia in Palermo (Sicily).
- March 14 – Second round of the Italian general election. The "ministerial" bloc of the Historical Left led by Giovanni Giolitti remains the largest in Parliament, winning 329 of the 508 seats. The Historical Right loses its important position and is replaced by the Radical Party of Ettore Sacchi, who becomes an ally of Giolitti, and the Italian Socialist Party of Filippo Turati, which continues its strong opposition to the government.
  In the socialist newspaper Avanti!, Gaetano Salvemini publishes an article entitled 'The minister of the underworld' (Il ministro della malavita), in which he attacks Giolitti's power system.

=== October ===
- October 24 – At the Italian city of Racconigi, Tsar Nicholas II of Russia was hosted by King Victor Emmanuel III. The foreign ministers the two nations, Tommaso Tittoni and Aleksandr Izvolsky, exchanged diplomatic notes on an informal agreement, known as the Racconigi Bargain, for Russia and Italy to support each other's interests in the Balkans and in the Ottoman Empire. Italy and the Russian Empire concluded another agreement with Austro-Hungarian Empire a few days later disregarding this agreement.

=== December ===
- December 10 – Guglielmo Marconi receives the Nobel Prize for Physics.
- December 11 – Prime Minister Giovanni Giolitti resigns and is succeeded by Sidney Sonnino.

== Sports ==
Naples FBC wins the first Lipton Challenge Cup, a football competition competed between clubs from Southern Italy and Sicily.

- April 4 – Luigi Ganna wins the 3rd Milan–San Remo bicycle race.
- April 25 – F.C. Pro Vercelli 1892 wins the 1909 Italian Federal Football Championship.
- May 2 – Francesco Ciuppa wins the 1909 Targa Florio endurance automobile race on Sicily.
- May 13–30 – The first Giro d'Italia is organized by La Gazzetta dello Sport to increase sales of the newspaper. The Italian rider Luigi Ganna of the Atala team wins the stage bicycle race.
- June 6 – Juventus wins the 1909 Italian National Football Championship.
- November 7 – Giovanni Cuniolo wins the 5th Giro di Lombardia bicycle race.

== Births ==
- January 9 - Herva Nelli, Italian-American operatic soprano (d. 1994)
- February 4 – René Gruau, Italian fashion illustrator (d. 2004)
- April 16 – Pippo Starnazza, Italian jazz singer, composer, musician, entertainer and actor (d. 1975)
- April 22
  - Rita Levi-Montalcini, Italian neurologist, Nobel Prize laureate (d. 2012)
  - Indro Montanelli, Italian journalist (d. 2001)
- May 26 – Maria Ripamonti, Italian Roman Catholic professed religious from the Ancelle della carità (d. 1954)
- June 24 – Tatiana Menotti, Italian operatic soprano (d. 2001)
- June 27 – Giuseppe Ballerio, Italian footballer (d. 1999)
- June 28 – Walter Audisio, Italian partisan and communist politician (d. 1973)
- June 29 – Vittorio Castellano, Italian statistician (d. 1997)
- July 5 – Isa Miranda, Italian actress who won the Palme d'Or at the Cannes Film Festival (d. 1982)
- July 17 – Alfonso Gatto, Italian poet (d. 1976)
- July 22
  - Licia Albanese, Italian-American operatic soprano (d. 2014)
  - Egidio Armelloni, Italian gymnast (d. 1997)
- July 28 – Eva Magni, Italian stage and film actress (d. 2005)
- July 30 – Vittorio Erspamer, Italian pharmacologist and chemist (d. 1999)
- August 28 – Lamberto Maggiorani, Italian actor notable for his portrayal of Antonio Ricci in Bicycle Thieves (d. 1983)
- September 29 – Vasco Bergamaschi, Italian road racing cyclist (d. 1979)
- October 10 – Guido Seborga, pseudonym of Guido Hess, Italian journalist, poet, painter and writer (d. 1990)
- October 11 – Nathan Cassuto, Italian rabbi and Nazi resistance leader (d. 1945)
- October 18 – Norberto Bobbio, Italian philosopher of law and political sciences (d. 2004)

== Deaths ==
- January 11 – Nicola Petrina, Sicilian socialist and politician; one of the national leaders of the Fasci Siciliani (Sicilian Leagues) (b. 1861)
- February 8 – Giacinto Morera, Italian engineer and mathematician, known for Morera's theorem (b. 1856)
- April 24 – Giovanni Vailati, Italian philosopher, historian of science, and mathematician (b. 1863)
- June 30 – Antonio Gabaglio, Italian statistician (b. 1840)
- October 19 – Cesare Lombroso, Italian criminologist and physician (b. 1835)
- December 4 – Alessandro Fortis, Italian politician who served as the first Jewish prime minister of Italy (b. 1842)
- December 16 – Enrico Hillyer Giglioli, Italian zoologist and anthropologist (b. 1845)
