= 1908 in Italy =

- Decades: 1880s; 1890s; 1900s; 1910s; 1920s
- See also: History of Italy; Timeline of Italian history; List of years in Italy

Events from the year 1908 in Italy.

== Kingdom of Italy ==
- Monarch – Victor Emmanuel III (1900–1946)
- Prime Minister – Giovanni Giolitti (1906–1909)
- Population – 34,198,000

== Events ==
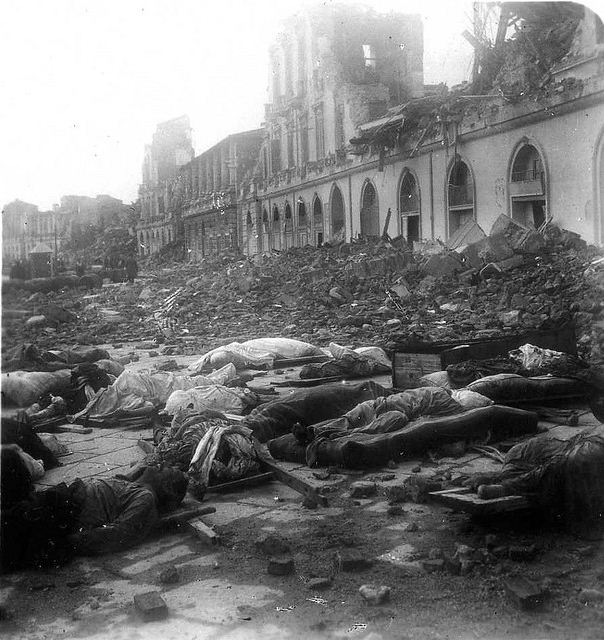
Corpses of victims of the earthquake in Messina, December 1908

Italian nationalism flourishes after 1908 in an uncertain and unstable international environment such as the Bosnian crisis and the First Moroccan Crisis in which colonial rivalry became intense and when alliances, such as the Triple Alliance to which Italy belonged and the Triple Entente that courted the Italians, became more fluid. Italy expected compensations in the Italia Irredenta's territories ruled by Austria-Hungary in exchange for its recognition of the annexation of Bosnia-Herzegovina, as it was agreed upon in the Triple Alliance treaties with Austria-Hungary.

- April 5 – The Italian Parliament enacts a basic law to unite all of the parts of southern Somalia into an area called Somalia Italiana.
- October 29 – The Italian business machine manufacturer Olivetti is founded in Ivrea, producing typewriters.
- December 27 – Italian newsstands saw the first issue of Il Corriere dei Piccoli, the first mainstream publication primarily dedicated to comics. The first issue introduced readers to the adventures of Bilbolbul, a little black kid drawn by Attilio Mussino that is considered the first Italian comic character.
- December 28 – A 7.1 magnitude earthquake hits in Sicily and Calabria, southern Italy. The cities of Messina and Reggio Calabria were almost completely destroyed and between 75,000 and 200,000 people died. Moments after the earthquake, a 12-meter (39-foot) tsunami struck nearby coasts, causing even more devastation.

== Sports ==
- March 8 – Juventus wins the 1908 Italian Football Championship.
- March 9 – Internazionale Milano, a professional Italian football club based in Milan is founded. Since its debut in 1909 the club features in the top tier of the Italian football league system.
- April 5 – Cyrille Van Hauwaert from Belgium wins the 2nd Milan–San Remo.
- April 27-October 31 – Italy competes at the 1908 Summer Olympics in London, England.
- September 6 – Vincenzo Trucco wins the 1907 Targa Florio endurance automobile race on Sicily.
- November 8 – François Faber from Luxembourg wins the 4th Giro di Lombardia.

== Births ==
- February 2 – Renzo Rossellini, Italian composer, best known for his film scores (d. 1982)
- February 6 – Amintore Fanfani, Italian politician and former Prime Minister of Italy (d. 1999)
- February 25 – Carlo Martini, Italian painter and academician (d. 1958)
- March 7 – Anna Magnani, Italian actress achieving international fame in Roberto Rossellini's Rome, Open City (1945), considered the first significant movie to launch the Italian neorealism movement in cinema (d. 1973)
- May 8 – Carlo Romano, Italian actor, voice actor and screenwriter (d. 1975)
- May 28 – Luigi Veronesi, Italian photographer, painter, scenographer and film director (d. 1998)
- June 24 – Tullio Pinelli, Italian screenwriter best known for his work on the Federico Fellini classics I Vitelloni, La Strada, La Dolce Vita and 8½ (d. 2009)
- June 30 – Luigi Rovere, film producer (d. 1996)
- September 5 – Cecilia Seghizzi, composer and painter (d. 2019)
- September 9 – Cesare Pavese, Italian poet, novelist, literary critic and translator (d. 1950)
- October 4 – Gaetano Stammati, Italian politician, minister, lecturer, public official and banker (d. 2002)
- November 3 – Giovanni Leone, former Prime Minister of Italy (d. 2001)
- November 28 – Roberto Lupi, Italian composer, conductor, and music theorist (d. 1971)
- December 21 – Luigi Barzini, Jr., Italian journalist, writer and politician most famous for his 1964 book The Italians (d. 1984)

== Deaths ==
- March 11 – Edmondo De Amicis, Italian novelist, journalist, poet and short-story writer (b. 1846)
- June 9 – Giulio Prinetti, Italian businessman and politician (b. 1851)
- August 7 – Antonio di Rudinì, former Prime Minister of Italy (b. 1839)
- August 14 – Anton Giulio Barrili, Italian novelist (b. 1836)
- December 15 – Alessandro Cruto, Italian inventor, who improved on Thomas Edisons incandescent light bulb (b. 1847)

=== Full date unknown ===
- Luigi Papafava, Italian painter and engraver (b. 1838)
