= 1905 in Italy =

- Decades: 1880s; 1890s; 1900s; 1910s; 1920s
- See also: History of Italy; Timeline of Italian history; List of years in Italy

Events from the year 1905 in Italy.

== Kingdom of Italy ==
- Monarch – Victor Emmanuel III (1900–1946)
- Prime minister –
  1. Giovanni Giolitti (1903–1905)
  2. Tommaso Tittoni (1905)
  3. Alessandro Fortis (1905–1906)
- Population – 33,489,000

== Events ==
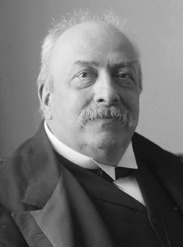
Prime Minister Alessandro Fortis

The year was marked by a crucial decision regarding the future of the railways – a choice between private ownership and state control – and the legal position of the railway workers. In February, the government introduced a bill proposing the full nationalisation of the railway system. The terms on which Prime Minister Alessandro Fortis agreed to take over the railways were so generous to the former private companies that the Historical Far Left denounced him for yielding to the interests of big business.

=== February ===
- February – Prime Minister Giovanni Giolitti brings a bill to the Chamber of Deputies for the nationalization of the railways that makes it a crime to stop or disturb railway service. The railway unions order a slowdown.

=== March ===
- March 5 – Pleading illness Giolitti resigns over the issue of national railways.
- March 12 – An interim government under Tommaso Tittoni takes over.
- March 28 – On the recommendation of Giolitti, Alessandro Fortis forms a new government, he is the first Jewish prime minister of Italy. The government undertakes the nationalization of the railways, after confronting a railroad strike in April that could have paralyzed transportation in the country.

=== April ===
- April – The Italian government acquired control (from a private Italian company called SACI) of the coastal area around Mogadishu, and creates the colony of Italian Somaliland.
- April 17 – Railroad workers go on strike on the eve of the presentation of the new railway bill to the Italian Chamber of Deputies. Fewer than half of the railwaymen complied. Fortis remained steadfast, and after four days, the strikers gradually returned to work.
- April 22 – The strike of railway workers ends with an agreement over arbitration between the government and railroad men. The Ferrovie dello Stato (State Railways) is instituted, taking control over the majority of the national railways, which were private until then, with a total of 10,557 km (6,560 mi) of lines. Railroad workers became public employees, which deprived them of the right to strike.

=== June ===
- June 11 – Pope Pius X promulgates the encyclical Il fermo proposito, which establishes Azione Cattolica as a non-political lay organization under the direct control of bishops. It was established after an earlier similar organization, Opera dei Congressi was disbanded in 1904 because many of its members were siding with modernism. Catholics were allowed by the pope to vote "to help the maintenance of the social order", but without lifting the Non Expedit of 1868 that prohibited Italian Catholics to participate in political elections in the Kingdom of Italy and, by extension, in Italian national political life. (Because of the Catholic opposition to the unification of Italy and capture of the Papal States).
- June 17 – The first Italian airship, the Aeronave Italia or Dirigibile Italia, designed and built by Count Almerico da Schio, took flight on from the city of Schio.

=== July ===
- July 1 – The three principal railway companies in Italy are brought together with a number of private operators into the nationalised Ferrovie dello Stato (State Railways), or FFSS, with a total of 10,557 km (6,560 mi) of lines.

=== September ===
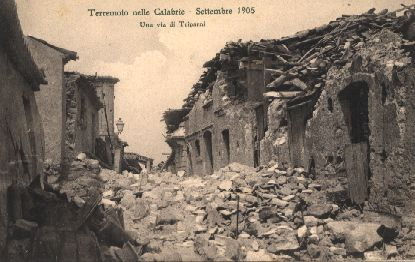
Damage of the earthquake in Triparni (Vibo Valentia)

- September 8 – An earthquake strikes southern Italy with a magnitude of 7.2, damaging parts of Lipari Island and Messina Province, and killing between 557 and 2,500 people. The earthquake particularly affects the Calabria region, destroying as many as 25 villages, and 14,000 homes. Fortis visited the area and introduced a special law to aid these southern regions. This measure was the first real acknowledgment by the Italian state of the fundamental problems underlying southern underdevelopment.

=== December ===
- December 3 – Foreign Minister Tittoni resigns over his proposal to reduce the duty on Spanish wine in connection with an Italo-Spanish commercial treaty that created turmoil among the rural classes.
- December 17 – The government of Prime Minister Fortis resigns because of the proposal to reduce the duty on Spanish wine in connection with an Italo-Spanish commercial treaty.
- December 23 – Fortis forms a new government, without Tittoni.

== Births ==
- January 8 – Giacinto Scelsi, Italian composer (d. 1988)
- February 1 – Emilio G. Segrè, Italian physicist, Nobel Prize laureate (d. 1989)
- April 13 – Bruno Rossi, Italian experimental physicist (d. 1993)
- May 5 - Maria Caniglia, Italian operatic soprano (d. 1979)
- June 21 - Tino Bianchi, Italian actor (d. 1996)
- July 13 - Eugenio Pagnini, Italian modern pentathlete (d. 1993)
- July 15 - Anita Farra, Italian actress (d. 2008)
- September 15 – Bernardo Mattarella, Italian politician (d. 1971)
- October 15 - Bruna Castagna, Italian operatic mezzo-soprano (d. 1983)
- October 29 - Giuseppe Alessi, Italian politician, president of Sicily (d. 2009)

== Deaths ==
- June 18 – Carmine Crocco, Italian brigand and folk hero (b. 1830)
- August 31 – Francesco Tamagno, Italian opera singer (b. 1850)
- September 14 – Pierre Savorgnan de Brazza, Franco-Italian explorer (b. 1852)
