= 1907 in Italy =

- Decades: 1880s; 1890s; 1900s; 1910s; 1920s
- See also: History of Italy; Timeline of Italian history; List of years in Italy

Events from the year 1907 in Italy.

== Kingdom of Italy ==
- Monarch – Victor Emmanuel III (1900–1946)
- Prime Minister – Giovanni Giolitti (1906–1909)
- Population – 33,952,000

== Events ==
In 1907, the Banco di Roma founds a branch in Tripoli and builds significant interests in banking, shipping and agriculture. The bank has powerful connections; the president Ernesto Pacelli is the uncle of the future Pope Pius XII, and the vice-president is Romolo Tittoni, the brother of Tommaso Tittoni, Italy's Prime Minister and Foreign Minister several times between 1903 and 1909. The bank also financed the important newspaper Corriere d'Italia that would campaign for the Italo-Turkish War in 1911.
Emigration out of Italy is expected to reach 1 million, mainly to the United States. Minimum wages in the US are five times higher than in Italy and remittances are an important source of income.

=== January ===
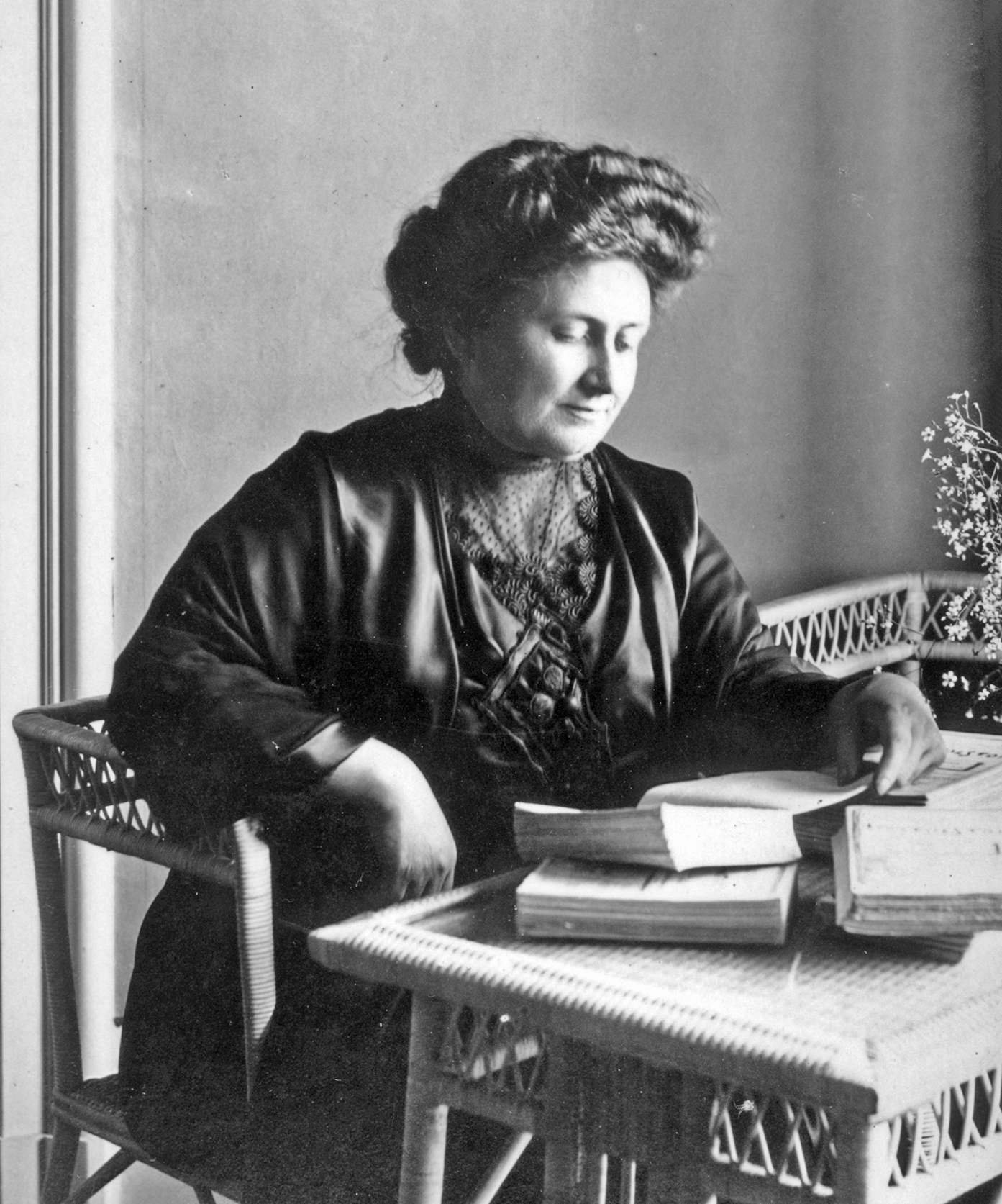
Maria Montessori

- January 6 – Education reformer Maria Montessori opens her first Casa dei Bambini, or Children's House, in Rome.

=== April ===
- April 28 – The volcano on the island of Stromboli is erupting large quantities of ash, damaging vineyards in Calabria and Sicily.

=== June ===
- June 22 – Bakers declare a general strike throughout the whole of Italy after the government postponed consideration of a bill prohibiting night work.

=== July ===
- July 15 – Former Minister of Public Instruction, Nunzio Nasi, is imprisoned on charges of embezzling USD 300,000.
- July 21 – Hundreds are wounded in Palermo (Sicily) in a clash between crowds and the police at a demonstration in favour of Nunzio Nasi, former Minister of Public Instruction, charged with embezzlement.

=== August ===
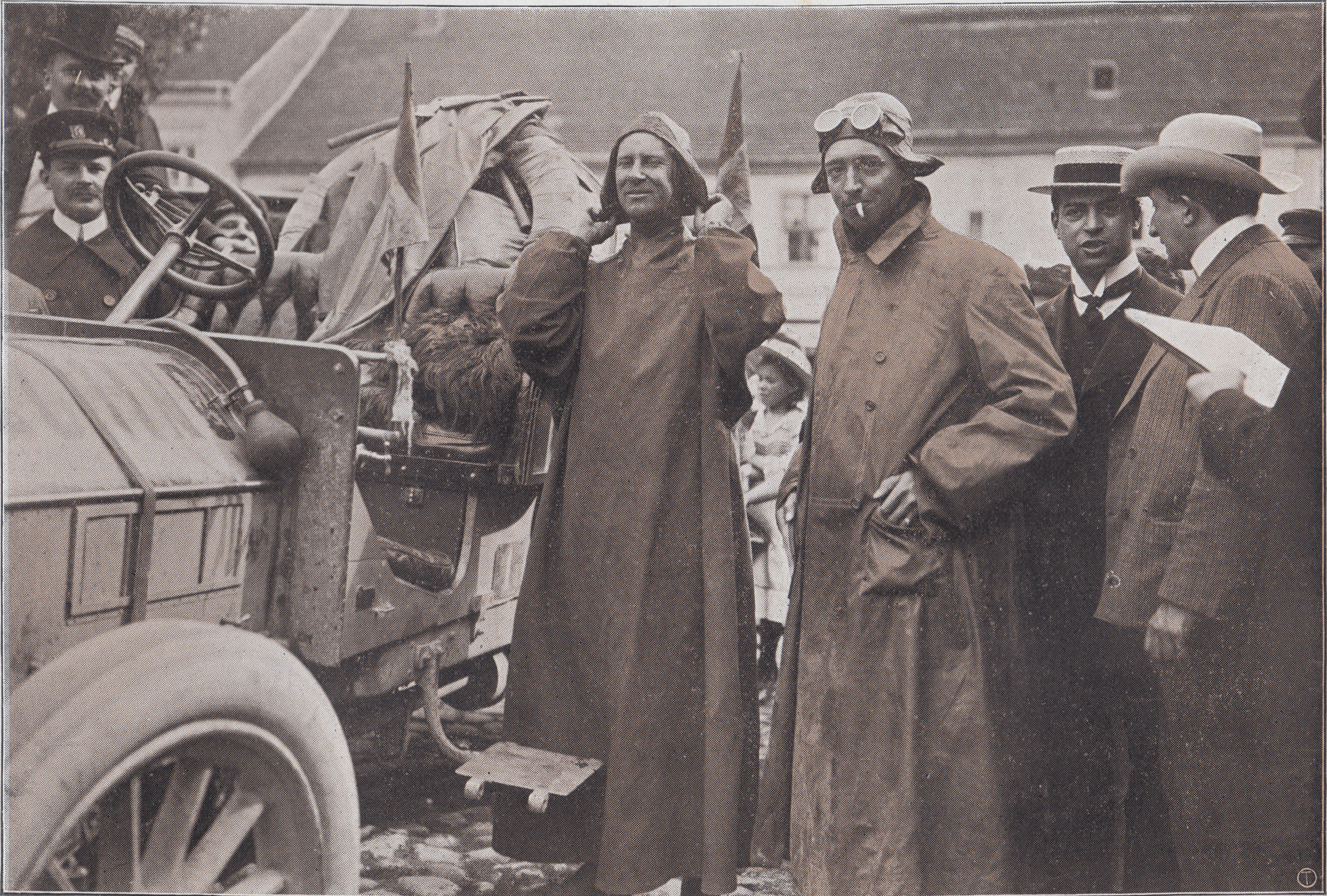
Borghese (left) and Barzini (right) in the 1907 Peking to Paris race

- August 10 – Prince Scipione Borghese and Ettore Guizardi, the prince's driver, win the Peking to Paris motor race with a 7-litre 35/45 hp Itala, accompanied by journalist Luigi Barzini, Sr.

=== October ===
- October 23 – A magnitude 5.9 earthquake strikes Calabria, at a depth of 33.0 km. The event caused 167 deaths and major damage. The town Ferruzzano was the epicentre where many houses collapsed almost completely, and 158 persons, or 8% of its population, were killed.

=== November ===
- November 11 – Due to financial difficulties in the United States, the stock exchange in Rome, unable to reverse a downward trend, is closed.
- November 17 – The area of Ferruzzano, Brancaleone and Bianco in Calabria was hit again by an earthquake.
- November 21 − Ernest Nathan is appointed the first Jewish mayor of Rome, after a victory of anti-clericals at the municipal elections.

== Sports ==
- April 14 – Lucien Petit-Breton wins the first official edition of Milan–San Remo, organised by La Gazzetta dello Sport.
- April 22 – Felice Nazzaro wins the 1907 Targa Florio endurance automobile race on Sicily.
- April 27 – A.C. Milan wins the 1907 Italian Football Championship.
- November 3 – Gustave Garrigou wins the Giro di Lombardia.

== Births ==
- March 2 – Lea Schiavi, Italian dissident journalist writing for left-wing journals in opposition to the Italian fascist government led by Benito Mussolini (d. 1942)
- June 25 – Franca Dominici, Italian actress (d. 1999)
- July 19 – Giulio Balestrini, Italian footballer (d. 1997)
- July 24 – Vitaliano Brancati, Italian novelist and screenwriter (d. 1954)
- August 31 – Altiero Spinelli, Italian political theorist and a European federalist (d. 1986)
- September 24 - Lina Bruna Rasa, Italian operatic soprano (d. 1984)
- November 21 – Giorgio Amendola, Italian writer and politician (d. 1980)
- November 28 – Alberto Moravia, Italian novelist (d. 1990)

== Deaths ==
- January 19 – Giuseppe Saracco, Italian politician and Prime Minister (b. 1821)
- February 16 – Giosuè Carducci, Italian writer, Nobel laureate (b. 1835)
- June 14 – Giuseppe Pellizza da Volpedo, Italian neo-impressionist painter (b. 1868)
