= 1906 in Italy =

- Decades: 1880s; 1890s; 1900s; 1910s; 1920s
- See also: History of Italy; Timeline of Italian history; List of years in Italy

Events from the year 1906 in Italy.

== Kingdom of Italy ==
- Monarch – Victor Emmanuel III (1900–1946)
- Prime Minister –
  1. Alessandro Fortis (1905–1906)
  2. Sidney Sonnino (1906)
  3. Giovanni Giolitti (1906–1909)
- Population – 33,718,000

== Events ==
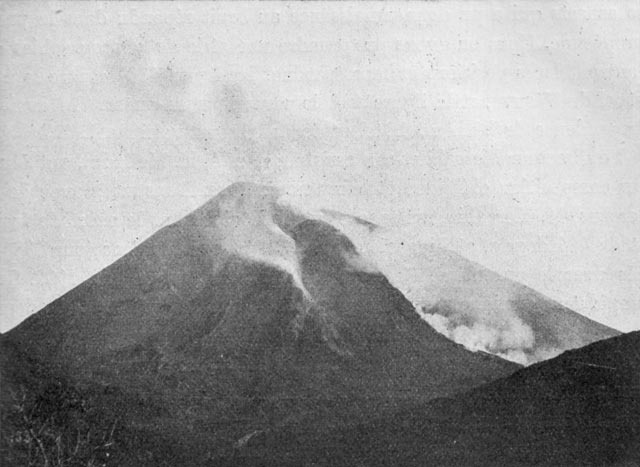
Mount Vesuvius immediately before its 1906 eruption

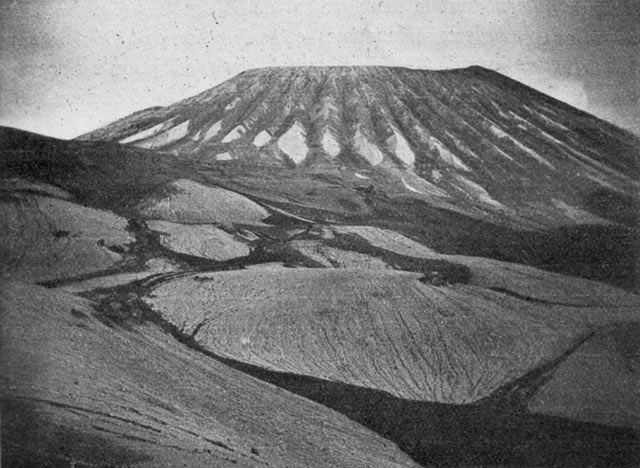
Mount Vesuvius immediately after its 1906 eruption.

The Italian film industry takes shape, led by three major organizations: Cines, founded in 1906 in Rome; and the Turin-based companies Ambrosio Film, founded by pioneering filmmaker Arturo Ambrosio in 1906, and Itala Film. Other companies soon followed in Milan and Naples, and these early companies quickly attained a respectable production quality and were able to market their products both within Italy and abroad.
Giosuè Carducci is the first Italian to win the Nobel Prize in Literature in 1906 "not only in consideration of his deep learning and critical research, but above all as a tribute to the creative energy, freshness of style, and lyrical force which characterize his poetic masterpieces".

=== January ===
- January 9 – Mount Vesuvius near Naples initiates activity; indications are that the volcano is becoming increasingly active.

=== February ===
- February 2 – Prime Minister Alessandro Fortis resigns.
- February 3 – Mount Vesuvius erupts again. The next weeks the activity of the volcano increases.
- February 8 – Sidney Sonnino forms a new Cabinet, representing the Historical Right. Giolitti does not openly oppose Sonnino, but his followers of the Historical Left do.
- February 24 – Opening of a Catholic congress in Florence. Creation of the Popular Union (Unione Popolare) and the Italian Catholic Electoral Union (Unione Elettorale Cattolica Italiana, UECI), after the suppression of the Opera dei Congressi ("Work of the Congress") following the encyclical Il fermo proposito of Pope Pius X on 11 June 1905.

=== April ===
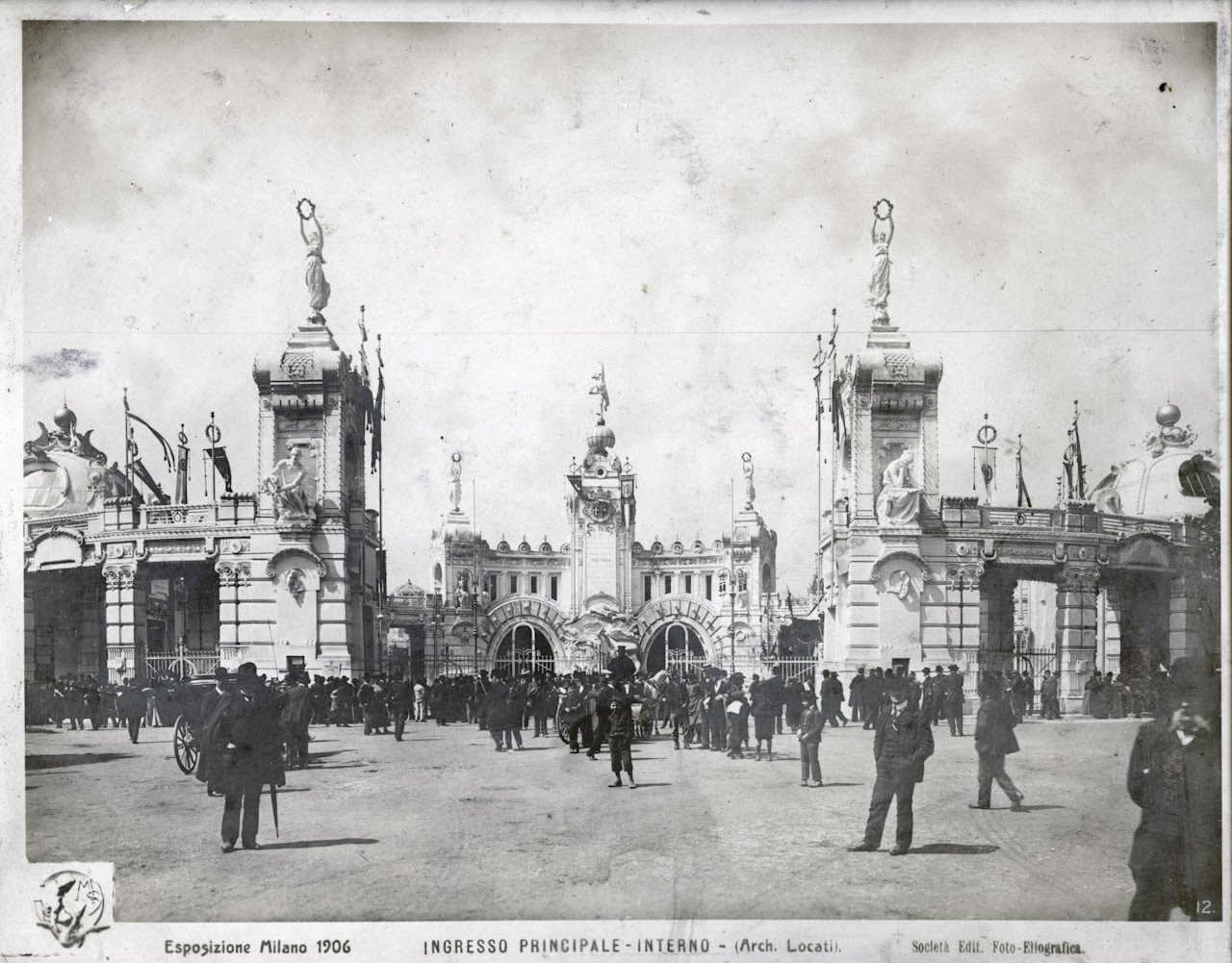
Main entrance of the 1906 Expo in Milan

- April 5 – Mount Vesuvius in Campania erupts, killing over 100 people and ejecting the most lava ever recorded from a Vesuvian eruption. Italian authorities were preparing to hold the 1908 Summer Olympics when Mount Vesuvius erupted, devastating the province of Naples. Funds were diverted to the reconstruction of Naples, requiring a new location for the Olympics to be found.
- April 10 – The lava flow from Mount Vesuvius, which had almost ceased, starts again in the direction of Torre Annunziata; reaches the cemetery of that town and then turns in the direction of Pompeii.
- April 28 – The Milan International world's fair opens in Milan. It would receive 4,012,776 visits and covered 100 hectares (250 acres).

=== May ===
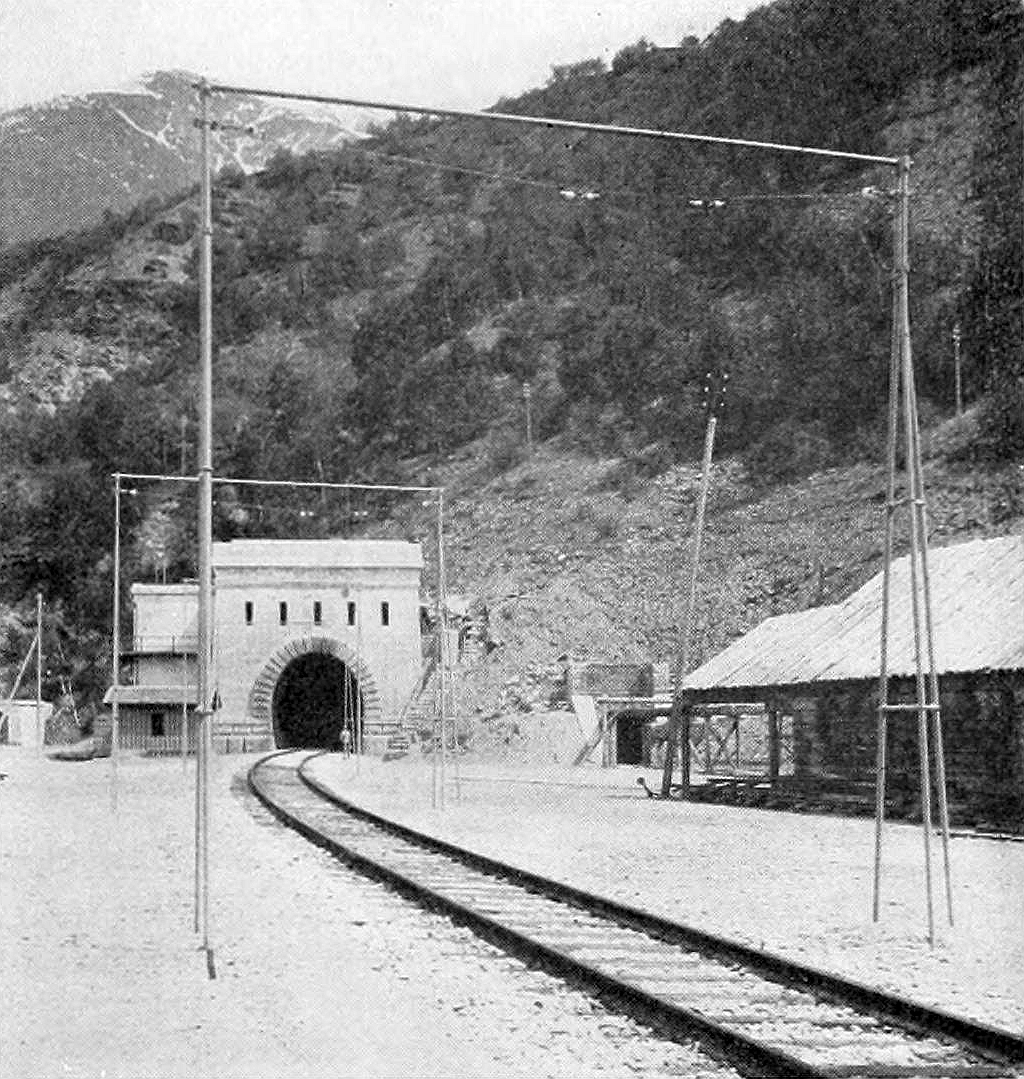
Simplon Tunnel, 1906

- May 6 – The first Targa Florio, an open road endurance automobile race, starts in the mountains of Sicily near Palermo. The race was initiated by Vincenzo Florio and is considered to be the oldest sports car racing event.
- May 18 – Prime Minister Sidney Sonnino is forced to resign. He proposed major changes to transform Southern Italy, which provoked opposition from the ruling groups.
- May 19 – The Simplon railway tunnel, connecting Brig, Switzerland and Domodossola, Italy, through the Alps, is inaugurated by the Italian king Victor Emmanuel III and the president of the Swiss Confederation (presiding the Federal Council of Switzerland for that year) Ludwig Forrer. Work on the first tube of tunnel commenced in 1898.
- May 29 – Giovanni Giolitti forms a new Cabinet. Giolitti's third government (until December 1909) was known as the "long ministry" (lungo ministero). The strong economic performance and the careful budget management of this government led to currency stability; this was also caused by a mass emigration and especially on remittances that Italian migrants sent to their relatives back home. The 1906–1909 triennium is remembered as the time when "the lira was premium on gold".

=== June ===
- June 6 – Murder of Gennaro Cuocolo and his wife, Maria Cutinelli, suspected of being police informers, and opposing the leadership of the Camorra. The murder case would develop into one of the most complicated legal cases of the early twentieth century in Italy against the Camorra.

=== October ===
- October 1 – Foundation of the Socialist labour union, the Confederazione Generale del Lavoro (General Confederation of Labour) in Milan.

== Births ==
- May 8 – Roberto Rossellini, Italian film director (died 1977)
- May 12 – Mario Martinelli, Italian politician (died 2001)
- June 2 – Carlo Scarpa, Italian architect (died 1978)
- June 12 – Sandro Penna, Italian poet (died 1977)
- June 13 – Bruno de Finetti, Italian probabilist, statistician and actuary (died 1985)
- July 12 – Pietro Tordi, Italian actor (died 1990)
- August 5 – Ettore Majorana, Italian theoretical physicist who worked on neutrino masses (disappeared 1938)
- October 16 – Dino Buzzati, Italian author and journalist (died 1972)
- November 2 – Luchino Visconti, Italian theatre and cinema director and writer (died 1976)
- December 30 – Alziro Bergonzo, Italian architect and painter (died 1997)

== Deaths ==
- September 1 – Giuseppe Giacosa, Italian poet and librettist (b. 1847)
- October 9 – Adelaide Ristori, Italian actress (b. 1822)

== Sources ==
- Bourgin, Georges (2018) [1929]. La formation de l'unité italienne (in French) (2 ed.). Paris: FeniXX. ISBN 978-2706204326.
- Mola, Aldo Alessandro (2002). Storia della monarchia in Italia (in Italian) (1. ed.). Milan: Bompiani. ISBN 978-8845252945.
- Seton-Watson, Christopher (1967). Italy from liberalism to fascism, 1870–1925. London: Methuen & Co Ltd. ISBN 0-416-18940-7.
