= 1903 in Italy =

- Decades: 1880s; 1890s; 1900s; 1910s; 1920s
- See also: History of Italy; Timeline of Italian history; List of years in Italy

The following events occurred in the year 1903 in Italy.

== Kingdom of Italy ==
- Monarch – Victor Emmanuel III (1900–1946)
- Prime Minister –
  1. Giuseppe Zanardelli (1901–1903)
  2. Giovanni Giolitti (1903–1905)
- Population – 33,004,000

== Events ==
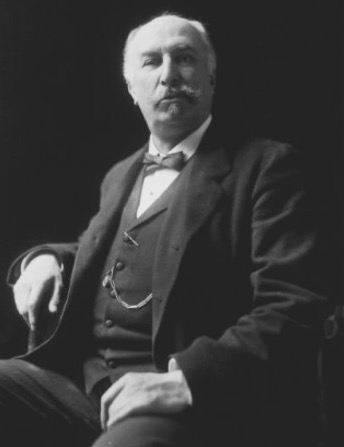
Giovanni Giolitti

The year is marked by the return of Giovanni Giolitti as Prime Minister. He will dominate Italian politics until World War I, a period known as the Giolittian Era in which Italy experienced an industrial expansion, the rise of organised labour and the emergence of an active Catholic political movement.

=== February ===
- February 13 – Venezuelan crisis. After agreeing to arbitration in Washington, Britain, Germany and Italy reach a settlement with Venezuela, resulting in the Washington Protocols. The naval blockade that began in December 1902 will be lifted, and Venezuela commit 30% of its customs duties to settling claims.

=== May ===
- May 31 – Law no. 254 is passed on aimed at improving living conditions for workers and to control housing speculation, with the establishment of a Public Housing Institute (Istituto per la Case Popolari). The law was also known as the Luzzatti law, since it was introduced by the deputy Luigi Luzzatti, a member of the opposition at that time.

=== June ===
- June 13 – Prime Minister Giuseppe Zanardelli resigns after losing a vote in the Italian Chamber of Deputies. However, after several attempts the Cabinet is reconstructed. The Interior Minister Giovanni Giolitti resigns and is replaced.

=== July ===
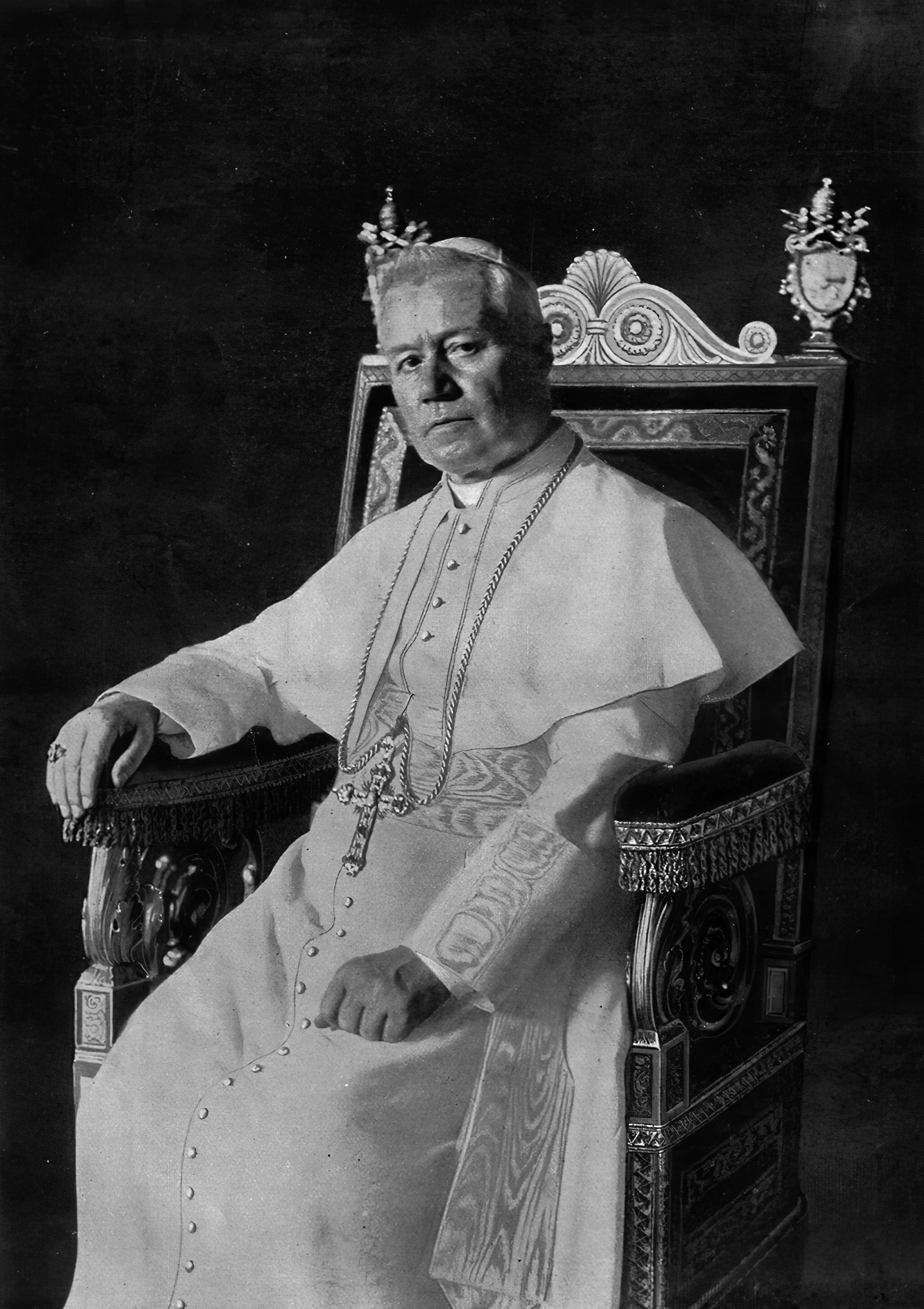
Pope Pius X in 1903

- July 20 – The 93-year-old Pope Leo XIII dies of pneumonia, followed by hemorrhagic pleurisy. He is remembered for his 1891 encyclical Rerum novarum, in which he outlined the rights of workers to a fair wage, safe working conditions, and the formation of trade unions, while affirming the rights to property and free enterprise, opposing both atheistic socialism and laissez-faire capitalism.
- July 31 – Start of the Papal conclave after the death of Pope Leo XIII. Giuseppe Melchiorre Sarto was elected on August 4 as Pope Pius X. Pius X's papacy would feature vigorous condemnation of what he termed 'modernists' and 'relativists' whom he regarded as dangers to the Catholic faith (see for example his Oath Against Modernism).

=== October ===
- October 12-17 – Visit of King Victor Emmanuel III and the Queen of Italy to Paris, accompanied by the Italian Foreign Minister Tommaso Tittoni, to mark the rapprochement between Italy and France, which could seriously affect the Triple Alliance.
- October 21 – Due to ill health Prime Minister Giuseppe Zanardelli resigns. He dies two months later.

=== November ===
- November 3 – Giovanni Giolitti forms his second government that would last until 12 March 1905. Giolitti tried to sign an alliance with the Italian Socialist Party, which was growing fast in the popular vote, but did not succeed. He strongly opposed the repression of labour union strikes. According to him, the government had to act as a mediator between entrepreneurs and workers.

== Births ==
- January 9 – Gioacchino Colombo, Italian automobile engine designer for Alfa Romeo and Ferrari (d. 1988)
- February 16 – Beniamino Segre, Italian mathematician (d. 1977)
- February 26 – Giulio Natta, Italian chemist, Nobel Prize laureate (d. 1979)
- March 18 – Galeazzo Ciano, Italian diplomat and Foreign Minister of Fascist Italy 1936–1943 (d. 1944)
- March 20 – Maria Giuseppa Robucci, Italian supercentenarian (d. 2019)
- July 14 – Corrado Bafile, Italian Catholic cardinal (d. 2005)
- July 16 – Adalberto Libera, Italian Modernist architect (d. 1963)
- September 13 – Leopoldo Rubinacci, Italian politician, lawyer and trade unionist (d. 1969)

== Deaths ==
- June 10 – Luigi Cremona, Italian mathematician (b. 1830)
- July 20 – Pope Leo XIII, Italian Roman Catholic Pope (b. 1810)
- December 26 – Giuseppe Zanardelli, Italian politician and Prime Minister (b. 1826)
