= Tommaso Tittoni =

Italian diplomat and politician (1855–1931)

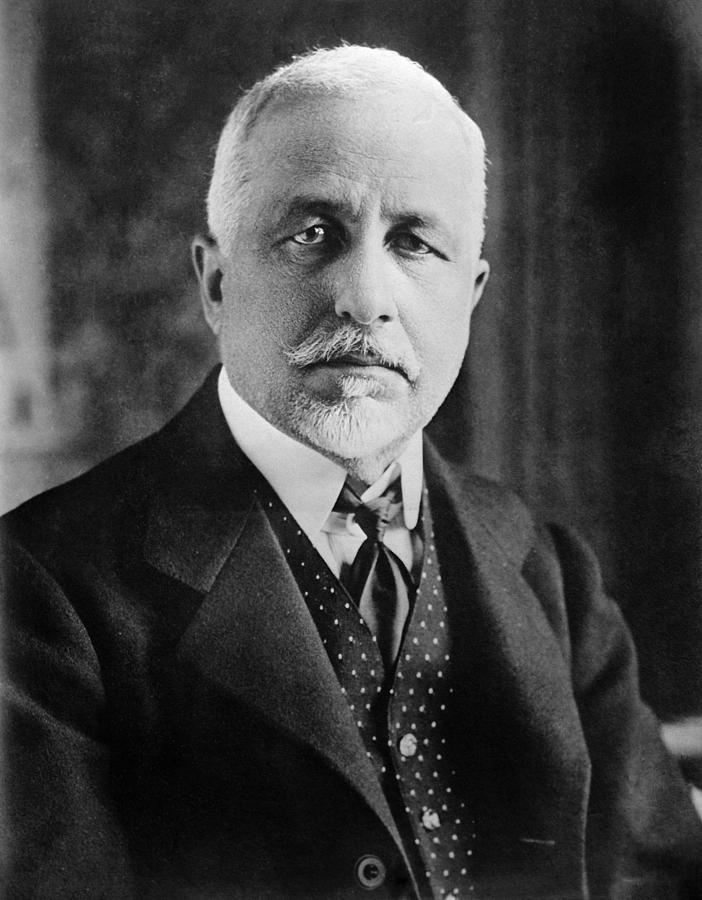

Prime Minister of Italy
- In office 12 March 1905 – 28 March 1905
- Monarch: Victor Emmanuel III
- Preceded by: Giovanni Giolitti
- Succeeded by: Alessandro Fortis

Minister of Foreign Affairs
- In office 23 June 1919 – 25 November 1919
- Prime Minister: Giovanni Giolitti
- Preceded by: Sidney Sonnino
- Succeeded by: Vittorio Scialoja
- In office 29 May 1906 – 11 December 1909
- Prime Minister: Giovanni Giolitti
- Preceded by: Francesco Guicciardini
- Succeeded by: Francesco Guicciardini
- In office 3 November 1903 – 24 December 1905
- Prime Minister: Giovanni Giolitti; Himself; Alessandro Fortis
- Preceded by: Giulio Prinetti
- Succeeded by: Antonino Paternò Castello

President of the Senate
- In office 1 December 1919 – 21 January 1929
- Preceded by: Adeodato Bonasi
- Succeeded by: Luigi Federzoni
Parliamentary offices
Member of the Senate of the Kingdom
In office 25 November 1902 – 7 February 1931
Appointed by	Victor Emmanuel III
Member of the Chamber of Deputies
In office 10 June 1886 – 2 March 1897
Constituency	Rome (1886–1892); Civitavecchia (1892–1897)

Personal details
- Born: 16 November 1855 Rome, Papal States
- Died: 7 February 1931 (aged 75) Rome, Kingdom of Italy
- Party: Historical Right

Tommaso Tittoni (Italian: [tomˈmaːzo titˈtoːni]; 16 November 1855 – 7 February 1931) was an Italian diplomat, politician and Knight of the Annunziata. He was Italy's foreign minister from 1903 until 1909, except for a five-month period. He also was interim prime minister for about two weeks in March 1905, making him the shortest-serving prime minister in the history of Italy.

== Early life ==
Tommaso Tittoni was born in Rome. His father, Vincenzo, a tenant farmer on a large scale at La Manziana, had taken part in the defence of the Roman Republic under Giuseppe Garibaldi in 1849, was exiled by Pius IX, and re-entered Rome in 1870 through the breach of Porta Pia. Tittoni was educated first at Naples, and subsequently at Oxford and Liège.

Tittoni became an alderman of Rome, before becoming a deputy in the Chamber of Deputies for Civitavecchia in 1886, aligning himself with the right wing. He resigned his seat in 1897, having been appointed prefect of Perugia. Three years later he went to Naples in a similar capacity, and in 1902 he entered the Senate.

== Foreign minister and prime minister ==
When Giovanni Giolitti became premier for the second time in 1903, Tittoni became his foreign minister. He aimed at improving relations with Austria-Hungary, and also tried to bring about a reconciliation with France. It was under his auspices that French President Émile Loubet visited Rome.

On the resignation of Giolitti in March 1905, Tittoni became interim premier for a few days and remained in Alessandro Fortis's cabinet as foreign minister. His proposal to reduce the duty on Spanish wines in connection with an Italo-Spanish commercial treaty aroused a storm of indignation among the agricultural classes and caused the fall of the cabinet on 24 December 1905, and although Fortis composed a new administration, Tittoni did not enter it.

== Foreign policy ==
A few months later he was appointed ambassador in London (March 1906), but in May, on the fall of Sidney Sonnino's ministry and the return of Giolitti to power, he was again summoned to the Consulta (the Foreign Ministry). He continued the policy of improving relations with Austria-Hungary, which did not contribute to his popularity. After the Bosnian crisis and the annexation of Bosnia-Herzegovina by Austria-Hungary, his imprudently worded speech at Carate created the illusion that Italy was to be compensated, perhaps by the cession of the Trentino, and the disappointment when nothing of the kind materialized greatly weakened his prestige. He remained in office until the fall of Giolitti in December 1909.

As foreign minister, Tittoni prudently advanced Italian claims on Tripolitania, at the time part of the Ottoman Empire, without resorting to outright threats of annexation. The Tittoni family had interests in the area. In 1907, the Banco di Roma founded a branch in Tripoli and built significant interests in banking, shipping and agriculture. The bank's vice-president was Romolo Tittoni, the brother of Tommaso Tittoni. The bank also financed the important newspaper Corriere d'Italia, which campaigned for the Italo-Turkish War in 1911.

On 24 October 1909, Tittoni and the Russian diplomat Aleksandr Izvolsky exchanged diplomatic notes on an informal agreement, known as the Racconigi Bargain, for Russia and Italy to support each other's interests in the Balkans and in the Ottoman Empire, at the Italian city of Racconigi, Tsar Nicholas II of Russia was hosted by King Victor Emmanuel III. Italy and the Russian Empire concluded another agreement with Austro-Hungarian Empire a few days later disregarding this agreement. In April 1910, he was appointed ambassador in Paris.

== World War I and Paris Peace Conference ==
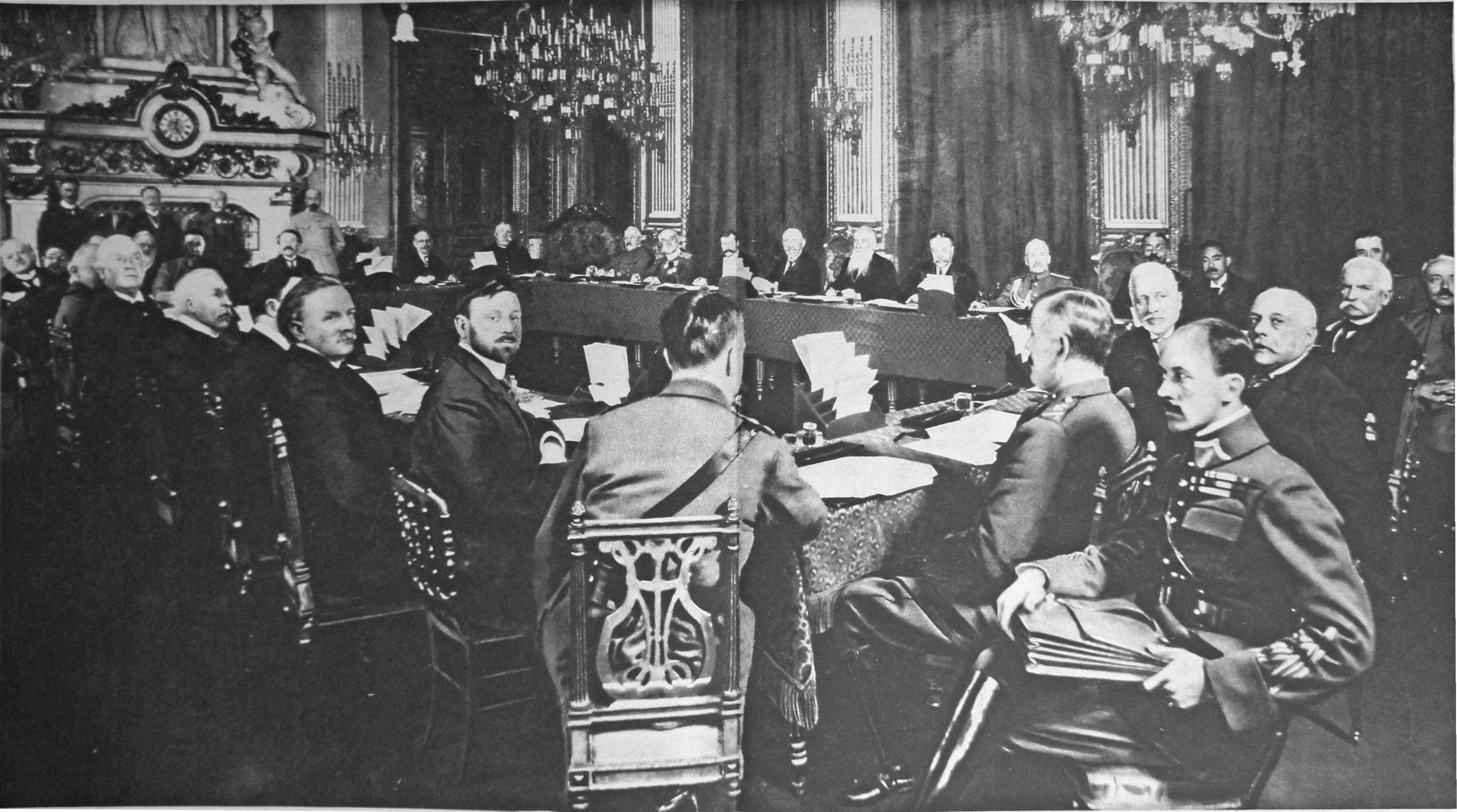
Tittoni and Prime Minister Antonio Salandra at a conference of the Allied Powers on 27–28 March 1916 in Paris

When World War I broke out, in spite of his Triplicist policy (supporting the Triple Alliance, the Triplice, of Germany, Austria-Hungary and Italy) he openly expressed himself in favour of Italian neutrality, and on Italy's entry into the war he was careful not to compromise himself with Giolitti's attitude. But he was not at his ease in the French capital, and in November 1916 he resigned from the Paris embassy. On the fall of the Orlando Cabinet in June 1919, the new Premier, Francesco Saverio Nitti, chose Tittoni as foreign minister and first delegate at the Paris Peace Conference. Nitti and Tittoni played down Italy's territorial claims, which disappointed interventionist like Gabriele D'Annunzio.

In July 1919, Tittoni and the Prime Minister of Greece, Eleftherios Venizelos, agreed on a secret non-binding agreement, known as the Venizelos–Tittoni agreement about the conflicting territorial claims of the two countries. Greece pledged to support the Italian claims over Vlorë and the establishment of an Italian protectorate over Albania. Greece would also secure for Italy a free zone at the port of Smyrna (under Greek administration from May 1919), while Italy pledged to support the Greek territorial claims over Northern Epirus and transfer the Dodecanese to Greece, except for the island of Rhodes, which would remain under Italian rule until such time as Cyprus would be ceded to Greece by Britain.

The severe strain of the work told on his health forced Tittoni to resign in November 1919. He was chosen president of the Italian Senate in December 1919, and soon after was appointed Italian delegate on the Council and Assembly of the League of Nations, but ill-health again forced him to relinquish the latter two appointments. He remained president of the Senate until January 1929.

== Support of Mussolini ==
After the March on Rome, Tittoni supported Mussolini's government and later became the first president of Royal Academy of Italy (28 October 1929 – 16 September 1930), the most important cultural institution of the fascist dictatorship. On 8 April 1923, he had received the supreme honour of the knighthood of the Annunziata by King Victor Emmanuel.

He died from a heart attack in Rome on 7 February 1931.

Political offices
Preceded by Giulio Prinetti	Italian Minister of Foreign Affairs; 1903–1905	Succeeded by Antonino Paternò Castello
Preceded by Giovanni Giolitti	Prime Minister of Italy; 1905	Succeeded by Alessandro Fortis
Preceded by Giovanni Giolitti	Italian Minister of the Interior; 1905	Succeeded by Alessandro Fortis
Preceded by Francesco Guicciardini	Italian Minister of Foreign Affairs; 1906–1909	Succeeded by Francesco Guicciardini
Preceded by Sidney Sonnino	Italian Minister of Foreign Affairs; 1919	Succeeded by Vittorio Scialoja
Preceded by Adeodato Bonasi	President of the Italian Senate; 1919–1929	Succeeded by Luigi Federzoni
