= Luigi Papafava =

Italian painter and engraver

Luigi Papafava (1838–1908) was an Italian painter and engraver.

== Biography ==
He was born and resident of Padua then part of the Austrian Empire. He trained under Vincenzo Gazzotto and painted genre, portraits, and religious subjects. He was also active in restorations of paintings and frescoes.

He worked in the studio of Luigi Naccari. He completed an engraved portrait of Lodovico Menin in that studio. In 1881, he exhibited at Venice, Il Marendino; in 1884 at Turin, Venditore di capre al vecchio mercato; I primi passi; and at the 1884 Promotrice of Turin, Invasione and Venditore di Zolfanelli. In 1890 at Florence, he exhibited La bozzetta dell'ogio; in 1908, Inverno and Partita a briscola. He painted an altarpiece of St Joseph for the church of San Salvatore a Camin in Padua.
