= Almerico da Schio =

Italian scientist

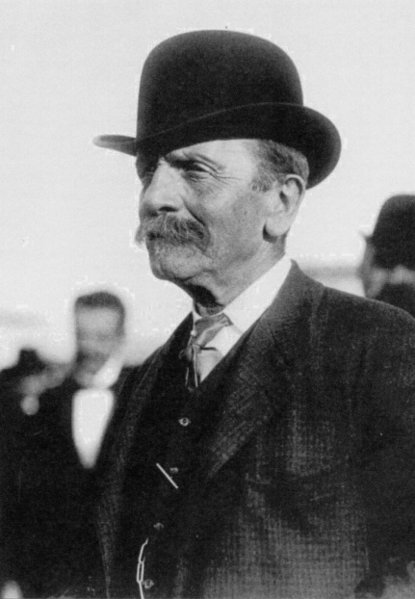

Count Almerico Alvise Cassiano da Schio (25 November 1836 – 28 November 1930) was an Italian nobleman, meteorologist, mountaineer, and a pioneer dirigible airship inventor.

== Life and work ==
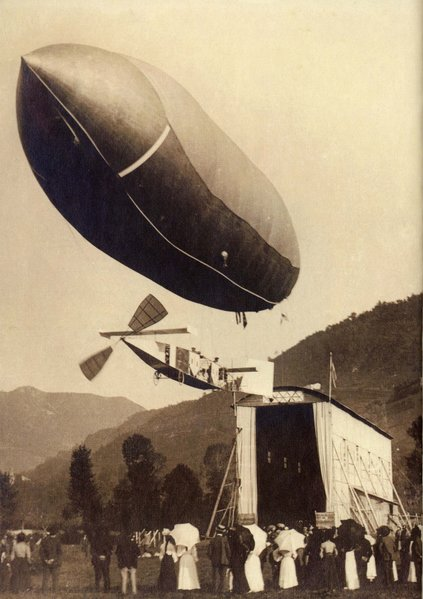
Dirigible Italia, 1905

Da Schio was born in Longare, son of Count Giovanni and Maria Calvi. He studied in Vicenza, lived in Venice and after wartime interruption in 1848 went to Padua to study law. He graduated in 1860 and worked for a while but became more interested in astronomy at the Padua observatory. He then studied mathematics and became a director at the observatory in Vicenza. In 1918 he began to organize meteorological observatories in Veneto, Trentino and Emilia and began to collate data in Rome. This also included phenological observations including the flowering, fruit ripening, leaf production and leaf fall of nearly 102 plant species. Data was collected from 1876 to 1884 from nearly 16 locations. In 1868 he served as councillor for Schio and served until 1909. He founded a group of alpinists in Vicenza in 1874 who merged with the Italian Alpine Club. In 1884 he became interested in airship design along with professor Pasquale Cordenons. He tried to produce a light engine to drive a propeller that could be mounted on the airship. After the death of Pasquale, his son Federico who also worked on the project gave up in 1895. Da Schio then continued the work on his own. In 1905 a nearly 38 m long airship Italia was finally launched and test flights were made.
