= Alessandro Fortis =

Italian politician (1842–1909)

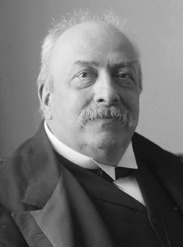

Prime Minister of Italy
- In office 28 March 1905 – 8 February 1906
- Monarch: Victor Emmanuel III
- Preceded by: Tommaso Tittoni
- Succeeded by: Sidney Sonnino

Personal details
- Born: 16 September 1842 Forlì, Papal States
- Died: 4 December 1909 (aged 67) Rome, Kingdom of Italy
- Party: Historical Left

Alessandro Fortis (Italian: [alesˈsandro ˈfɔrtis]; 16 September 1842 – 4 December 1909) was an Italian politician who served as the 18th prime minister of Italy from 1905 to 1906.

== Early career ==
Fortis was born in Forlì, in Emilia-Romagna, Italy, and became a lawyer. A republican follower of Giuseppe Mazzini, he joined Giuseppe Garibaldi in 1866 and fought with him first in Trentino then at Mentana and in France. After being elected to the Chamber of Deputies in 1880, Fortis initially worked under Francesco Crispi as Under Secretary of the Interior (1887–1890). He served as Agriculture Minister from 1898 to 1899 in the first government of Luigi Pelloux (June 1898–May 1899).

He resigned in 1899 and subsequently joined the liberal opposition of Giovanni Giolitti, whose liberal reformism was closest to Fortis’s own political views that had moderated over time. Fortis argued that a view of the state "which abstains from everything, which increasingly reduces its actions and its responsibilities; the state which is feared, rather than appealed to ... is, it seems to me, doomed to die out."

The moderate liberals opposed the repressive measures of Pelloux restricting political activity and free speech, and aimed to uphold constitutional liberties. Fortis supported the governments of Giuseppe Zanardelli (February 1901 – November 1903) and Giolitti (November 1903 – March 1905).

== Prime minister ==
In March 1905 on the recommendation of Giolitti, he formed his first government, mainly related to the nationalization of the railways, after confronting a railroad strike on April 17–22 that year, which could have paralyzed transportation in the country. Railroad workers became public employees, which deprived them of the right to strike.

In September 1905, Fortis visited Calabria and Sicily to examine firsthand the extent of the damage of the 1905 Calabria earthquake. Subsequently he introduced a special law to aid these southern regions. This measure was the first real acknowledgment by the Italian state of the fundamental problems underlying southern underdevelopment.

His government was defeated in the Chamber of Deputies (the lower house of Parliament) in December 1905, when a trade treaty with Spain that would have significantly reduced Italian tariffs on Spanish wine, met with severe parliamentary and public opposition and was rejected. Fortis resigned, was reappointed and formed a new government, which did not gain the confidence of the Chamber of Deputies, after which Fortis definitively resigned in February 1906.

== Death and family ==
Fortis was Jewish. He died on 4 December 1909 in Rome.

Political offices
Preceded by Tommaso Tittoni	Prime Minister of Italy; 1905–1906	Succeeded by Sidney Sonnino
Preceded by Tommaso Tittoni	Italian Minister of the Interior; 1905–1906	Succeeded by Sidney Sonnino
