= Giulio Prinetti =

Italian politician

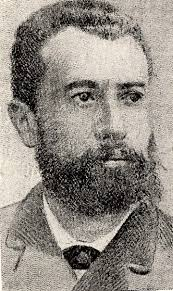
A portrait of Giulio Prinetti

Giulio Nicolò Marchese Prinetti (6 June 1851 – 9 June 1908) was an Italian businessman and politician from Milan.

He was the Italian Minister of Foreign Affairs in Giuseppe Zanardelli's period between 1901 and 1903, and signed the Triple Alliance (1882) renewal in 1902. Before that, he was deputy to the department of public works, elected in 1882. He became the Italian Minister of Public Works under Antonio Starabba, Marchese di Rudinì between March 1896 and December 1897. Between 1883 and 1901, he was the co-owner of the Prinetti & Stucchi automobile manufacturer. Prinetti left politics after being struck by apoplexy in 1904, and died in Rome four years later.

== Honours ==
- 1903 : Created Marquis by Royal decree.
- 1903 : Knight grand Cross in the Order of Saints Maurice and Lazarus.
- Russian Empire: Knight Grand Cordon of the Imperial Order of Saint Alexander Nevsky - July 1902.
- Kingdom of Prussia: Knight of the Order of Merit of the Prussian Crown - August 1902 - during the visit to Germany of King Victor Emmanuel III of Italy
- France: Grand Cross of the Legion d'Honneur – November 1902 – ″in testimony of the good relations between France and Italy″.
