= Racconigi Bargain =

1909 secret agreement between Italy and Russia

The Racconigi Bargain (Italian: L'accordo di Racconigi, Russian: сделка в Раккониджи, also known in Russia as the Russo-Italian Agreement, Русско-итальянское соглашение) was a secret agreement between King Victor Emmanuel III of Italy and Tsar Nicholas II of the Russian Empire, concluded on 24 October 1909 at the Castle of Racconigi, in Italy.

Its terms included:

- If Russia or Italy concluded agreements concerning Eastern Europe with another power, the other party of the agreement would also participate in such new agreement.
- Italy recognised that Russian interests in the Turkish Straits should be controlled by Russia. In return, Russia recognised Italian interests in Tripoli and Cyrenaica.

From Italy's point of view, the Racconigi Bargain facilitated Italy's preparations for the Italo-Turkish War two years later during which Italy conquered Tripoli and Cyrenaica.
