= Demographics of Italy =

- Population pyramid of Italy as of 1 January 2023
- Population: ▼58,934,177 (31 December 2024)
- Density: ▼201/km^{2} (520/sq mi) (2024)
- Growth rate: ▼ −0.06% (2024)
- Birth rate: ▼6.3 births/1,000 population (2024)
- Death rate: ▼10.4 deaths/1,000 population (2024)
- Life expectancy: ▲83.4 years (2024)
  - male: ▲81.4 years
  - female: ▲85.5 years
- Fertility rate: ▼1.18 children born/woman (2024)
- Infant mortality: ▼3.6 deaths/1,000 live births (2015)
- Net migration rate: ▲1.3 migrant(s)/1,000 population (2020)
- Immigrant share: 11.0% (2024)

Age structure
- 0–14 years: ▼11.7% (2025 est.)
- 15–64 years: ▼63.2% (2025 est.)
- 65 and over: ▲25.1% (2025 est.)

Nationality
- Nationality: noun: Italian(s) adjective: Italian
- Major ethnic: Italians (89.9%) (Native)
- Minor ethnic: Romanians (2.04%); Albanians (1.36%); Moroccans (0.78%); Ukrainians (0.71%); Germans (0.68%); Chinese (0.56%); Bengali (0.51%); French (0.51%); Indians (0.35%); Brazilians (0.27%); Egyptians (0.24%); Tunisians (0.22%); Poles (0.21%); Greeks (0.2%); Peruvians (0.2%); Russians (0.2%); Filipinos (0.18%); Slovenes (0.14%)

Language
- Official: Italian
- Spoken: Languages of Italy

Animated population pyramid 1982–2021. Those born during the World wars are marked in dark

The demography of Italy is monitored by the Italian National Institute of Statistics (Istat).

At the beginning of 2024, Italy had an estimated population of 58.9 million. Its population density, at 195.7 inhabitants per square kilometre (507/sq mi), is higher than both the EU (106.6/km^{2}) and European (72.9/km^{2}) average. The geographic distribution of the population is very uneven. The most densely populated areas are the Po Valley in northern Italy, with about a third of Italy's population, and the metropolitan areas of Rome and Naples in central and southern Italy. Landlocked, rural and mountainous areas are very sparsely populated, notably the Alps and Apennines ranges, the plateaus of Basilicata and Puglia, the inland highlands of Sicily and the Mediterranean island of Sardinia.

Italy's population almost doubled during the 20th century. The pattern of growth was extremely uneven due to large-scale internal migration from the impoverished, largely rural South to the industrial cities of the North, especially during the Italian economic miracle of the 1950s and 1960s. After decades of net emigration, since the late 1980s Italy has experienced large-scale international immigration. As a result, in 2024 there were 5.4 million foreign-born residents in Italy, or about 9.2% of Italy's total population.

High fertility and birth rates persisted through the 1970s, then declined sharply in the 1980s and 1990s, leading to rapid population aging. At the end of the 2000s, one in five Italians was over 65 years old. In 2024, Italy's total fertility rate was 1.18, well below the EU average (1.38) and one of the lowest in the world.

Since the revision of the Lateran Treaty in 1984, Italy has no official religion, although the Catholic Church enjoys a privileged legal status and plays a prominent role in Italian society and politics. In 2017, 78% of the population identified as Catholic, 15% as non-believers or atheists, 2% as other Christians and 6% adhered to other religions.

== Historical overview ==
=== 1861 to early 20th century ===
A map of the global Italian diaspora

After achieving its unification in 1861, Italy experienced a prolonged period of net emigration, mainly caused by the breakdown of traditional agrarian structures coupled with slow industrialization, that peaked in the years before World War I. Between 1898 and 1914, at the height of Italian diaspora, up to 750,000 Italians left the country every year in search of brighter prospects. As a consequence, significant numbers of people with Italian ancestry are found in Brazil (32 million Italian Brazilians), Argentina (25 million Italian Argentines), United States (18 million Italian Americans), France (5 million Italian French), Venezuela (5 million Italian Venezuelans), Paraguay (2.5 million Italian Paraguayans), Colombia (2 million Italian Colombians), Uruguay (1.5 million Italian Uruguayans), Peru (1.5 million Italian Peruvians), Canada (1.5 million Italian Canadians), Germany (1.2 million Italian Germans) and Australia (1 million Italian Australians).

Italian communities once thrived in the former Italian colonial empire. There were about 100,000 settlers living in Eritrea and Somalia, and about 150,000 in Libya, that mostly left Africa after World War II and decolonization.

=== After 1945 ===
==== Outcomes of World War II and decolonization ====
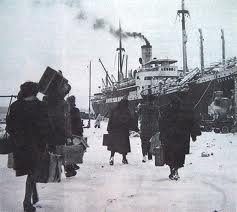
Istrian Italians leave Pola in 1947 during the Istrian-Dalmatian exodus

After communist Yugoslavia annexed Istria, Kvarner, most of the Julian March as well as the Dalmatian city of Zara following the Treaty of Peace with Italy, 1947, up to 350,000 local ethnic Italians (Istrian Italians and Dalmatian Italians) fled to Italy in the Istrian–Dalmatian exodus. In addition, World War II itself caused half a million military and civilian casualties. In 1970 about 20,000 Italians were expelled from Libya by Muammar Gaddafi's regime.

==== Post-war economic miracle ====
Rapid economic growth in the 1950s, 1960s and early 1970s caused massive inflows of migrants from rural areas of Southern Italy to the so-called "industrial triangle", the area containing the major industrial cities of Milan and Turin and the seaport of Genoa, in north-west Italy. Between 1955 and 1971, around 9 million people are estimated to have been involved in inter-regional migrations, uprooting entire communities and creating large metropolitan areas.

==== 21st century ====
The rapid transition from agrarian to post-industrial society accelerated numerous demographic trends, including a sharp decline in fertility and birth rates, fast population aging and a shrinking workforce; by the 1980s emigration had all but stopped and Italy started to have a positive net migration rate. By the 1990s, as Italy's TFR dropped below 1.2 and deaths outpaced births, international migration became the main driver of population growth. Foreign-born residents in Italy increased from 1.3 million in 2001, to 4 million in 2011, and 5.2 million in 2021.

In the 2010s, as a combined effect of the global financial crisis, the Eurozone crisis double-dip recession and the Arab Spring, Italy experienced a significant slowdown in legal international migration, that coincided with the arrival of more than 150,000 illegal asylum seekers.

As a direct effect of the 2020–2023 COVID-19 pandemic, Italy registered more than 198,000 excess deaths, while the associated economic uncertainty and disruption of social relations have been linked to a marked decline in fertility rates across numerous Western countries, including Italy. In subsequent years, the average number of births in Italy fell from 494,000 in 2010–19 to 399,000 in 2020–22, while deaths increased from 617,000 to 719,000; as a result, the natural balance declined form −123,000 to –320,000, largely not compensated by net migration, discouraged by COVID-19 restrictions and the economic impact of the COVID-19 pandemic.

== Population ==
Historic population of Italy

Historical population
Year	Pop.	±% p.a.
1861	21,777,334	—
1871	26,801,154	+2.10%
1881	28,459,628	+0.60%
1901	32,475,253	+0.66%
1911	34,671,377	+0.66%
1921	37,973,977	+0.91%
1931	41,176,671	+0.81%
1936	42,993,602	+0.87%
1951	47,515,537	+0.67%
1961	50,623,569	+0.64%
1971	54,136,547	+0.67%
1981	56,556,911	+0.44%
1991	56,778,031	+0.04%
2001	56,995,744	+0.04%
2011	59,433,744	+0.42%
2021	59,236,213	−0.03%
2026	58,942,828	−0.10%
Source: ISTAT

View source data.
View source data.

=== Life expectancy ===
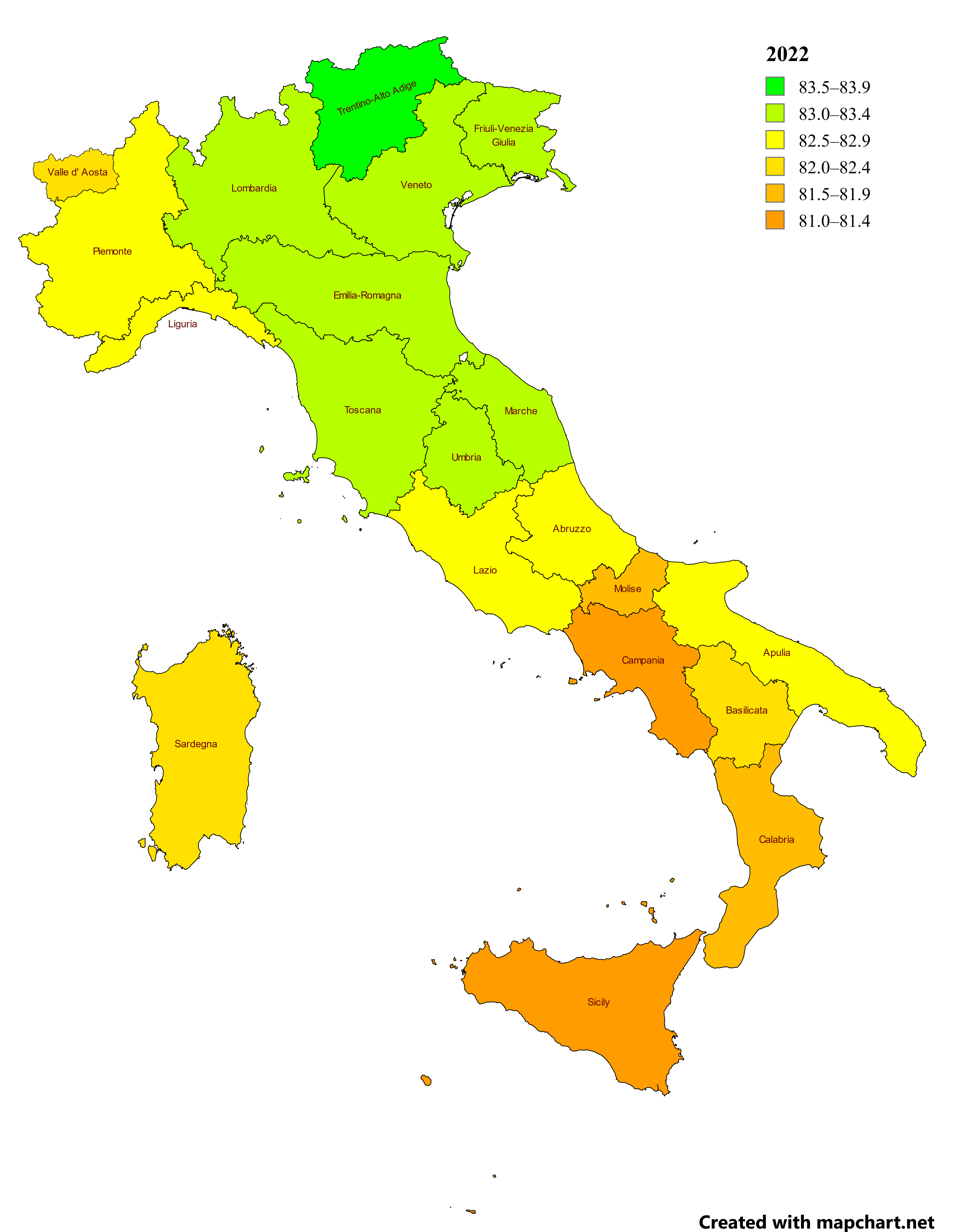
Italian regions by life expectancy in 2022

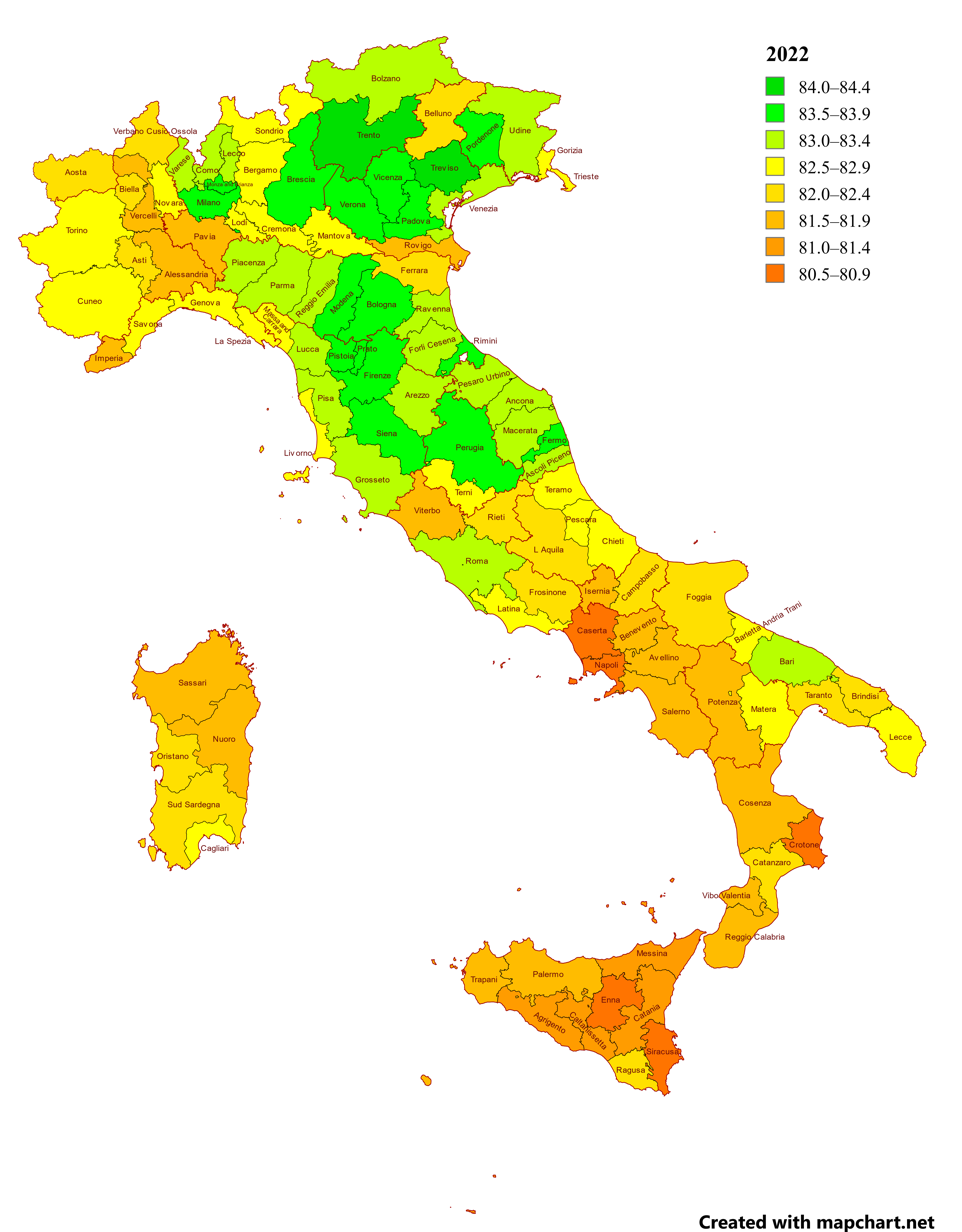
Italian provinces by life expectancy in 2022

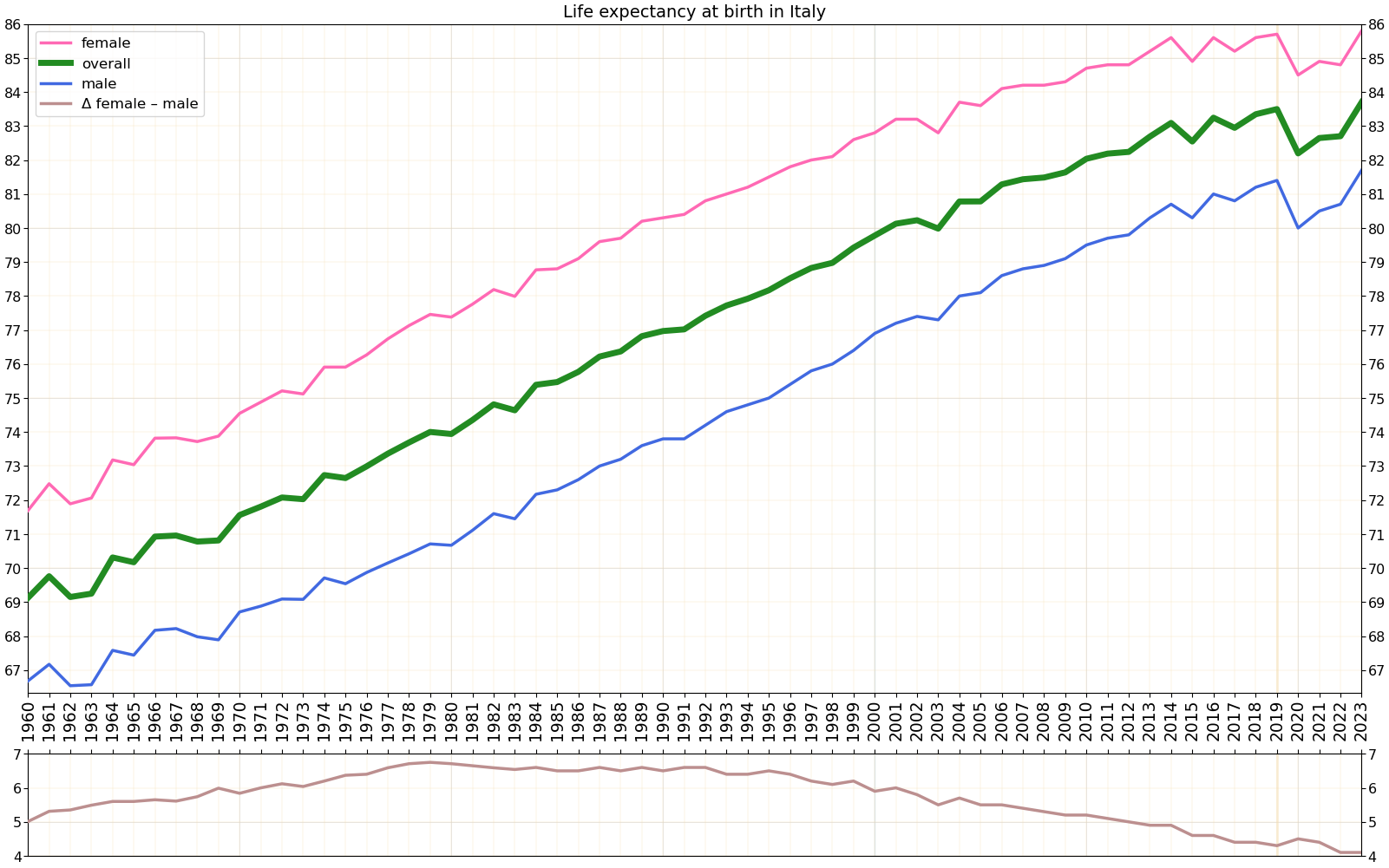
Life expectancy in Italy since 1960 with sex gap

Life expectancy in Italy since 1872

Sources: Our World In Data and the United Nations. 1871–1950

Life expectancy in Italy
Years	1871	1872	1873	1874	1875	1876	1877	1878	1879	1880
Life expectancy	29.8	29.7	31.6	31.8	31.3	33.6	34.9	34.3	34.0	32.8
Years	1881	1882	1883	1884	1885	1886	1887	1888	1889	1890
Life expectancy	34.2	34.3	35.2	36.6	36.9	35.1	36.0	37.0	39.1	38.5
Years	1891	1892	1893	1894	1895	1896	1897	1898	1899	1900
Life expectancy	38.5	38.9	39.8	40.0	39.6	40.7	43.3	42.3	43.7	67.8
Years	1901	1902	1903	1904	1905	1906	1907	1908	1909	1910
Life expectancy	43.5	43.0	43.1	44.4	43.9	45.1	45.4	43.1	44.6	46.7
Years	1911	1912	1913	1914	1915	1916	1917	1918	1919	1920
Life expectancy	44.7	48.9	48.4	49.9	42.5	39.6	38.1	25.8	42.3	45.5
Years	1921	1922	1923	1924	1925	1926	1927	1928	1929	1930
Life expectancy	49.2	50.0	51.4	51.5	51.3	50.9	52.5	52.6	52.3	55.2
Years	1931	1932	1933	1934	1935	1936	1937	1938	1939	1940
Life expectancy	54.8	54.7	56.3	56.8	56.2	56.7	55.5	56.1	57.6	57.0
Years	1941	1942	1943	1944	1945	1946	1947	1948	1949	1950
Life expectancy	54.7	52.5	49.4	52.4	54.9	59.0	61.2	63.4	64.1	65.8

1950–2020

Period	Life expectancy in Years	Period	Life expectancy in Years
1950–1955	66.5	1985–1990	76.4
1955–1960	68.4	1990–1995	77.5
1960–1965	69.7	1995–2000	78.8
1965–1970	70.9	2000–2005	80.3
1970–1975	72.2	2005–2010	81.5
1975–1980	73.6	2010–2015	82.4
1980–1985	74.9	2015–2020	83.3

Source: UN World Population Prospects

=== Fertility ===
Italy experienced a short-term growth in fertility and birth rates in the 2000s. The TFR temporarily rose from an all-time low of 1.18 children per woman in 1995 to 1.46 in 2010. By 2024, Italy's TFR dropped again to 1.18. The decline in fertility, that in Italy and Spain is more pronounced that in northern European countries, has long puzzled demographers; some tentative explanations could be rooted in the lack of affordable childcare services and sociocultural norms regarding family building and female work participation.

In 2021 this was 1.47 children born/woman

Mother's mean age at first birth; 31.1 years (2017 est.)

=== Historical Total Fertility Rate ===
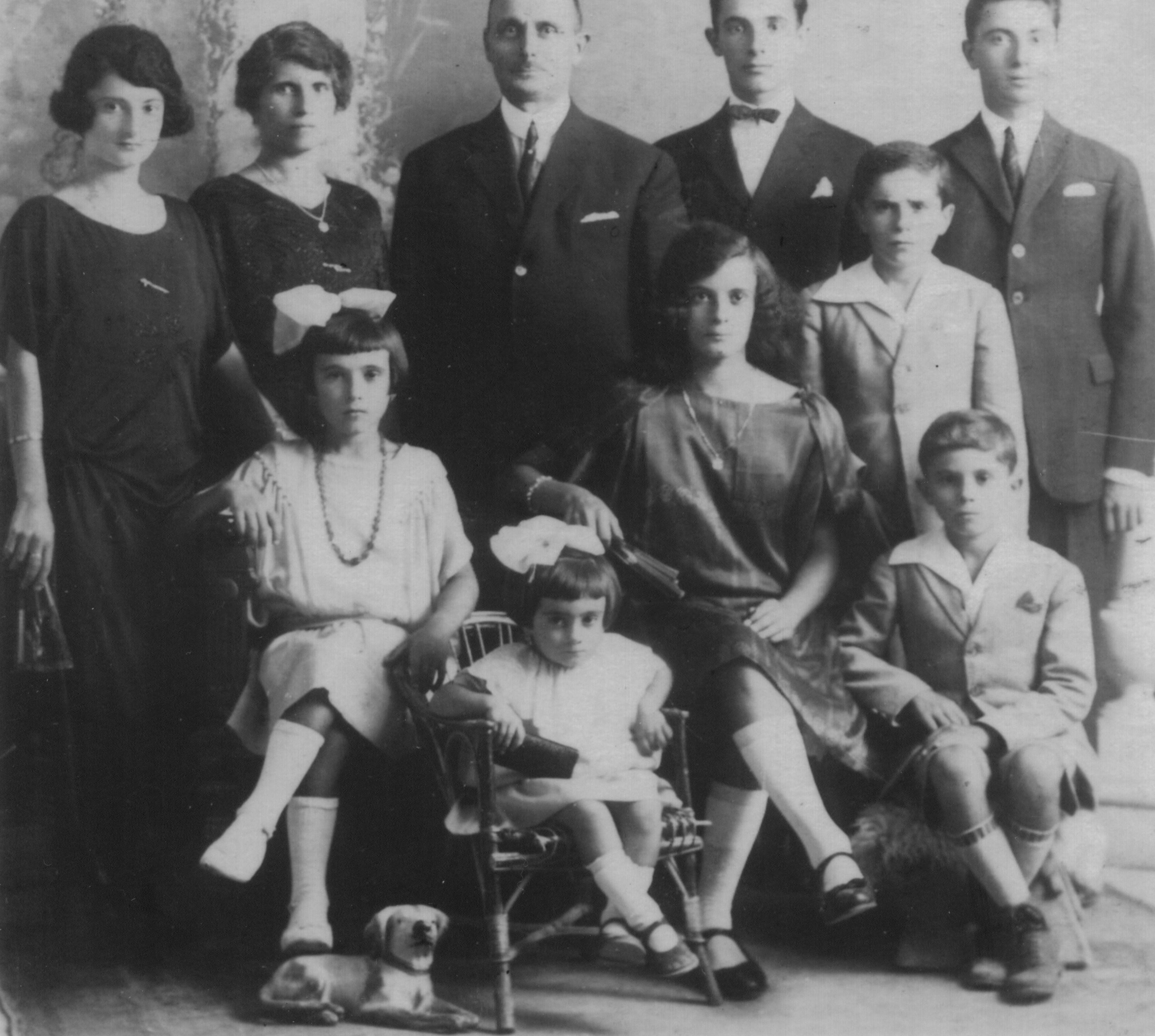
The Sicilian photographer Giuseppe Riggio (1871–1960) with his large nuclear family in 1925

=== Age structure ===
0–14 years: 0–14 years: 13.45% (male 4,292,431/female 4,097,732)
15–24 years: 9.61% (male 3,005,402/female 2,989,764)
25–54 years: 40.86% (male 12,577,764/female 12,921,614)
55–64 years: 14% (male 4,243,735/female 4,493,581)
65 years and over: 22.08% (male 5,949,560/female 7,831,076) (2020 est.)

Median age

total: 46.5 years. Country comparison to the world: 5th
male: 45.4 years
female: 47.5 years (2020 est.)

=== Cities ===
70.4% of Italian population is classified as urban, a relatively low figure among developed countries. Italy's administrative boundaries have seen significant devolution in recent decades; the metropolitan area was created as a new administrative unit, and major cities and metro areas now have a provincial status.

In 2008, the largest conurbations were:

- Milan – 7.4 million
- Rome – 3.7 million
- Naples – 3.1 million
- Turin – 2.2 million

Urbanization

urban population: 71% of total population (2020)
rate of urbanization: 0.29% annual rate of change (2015–20 est.)

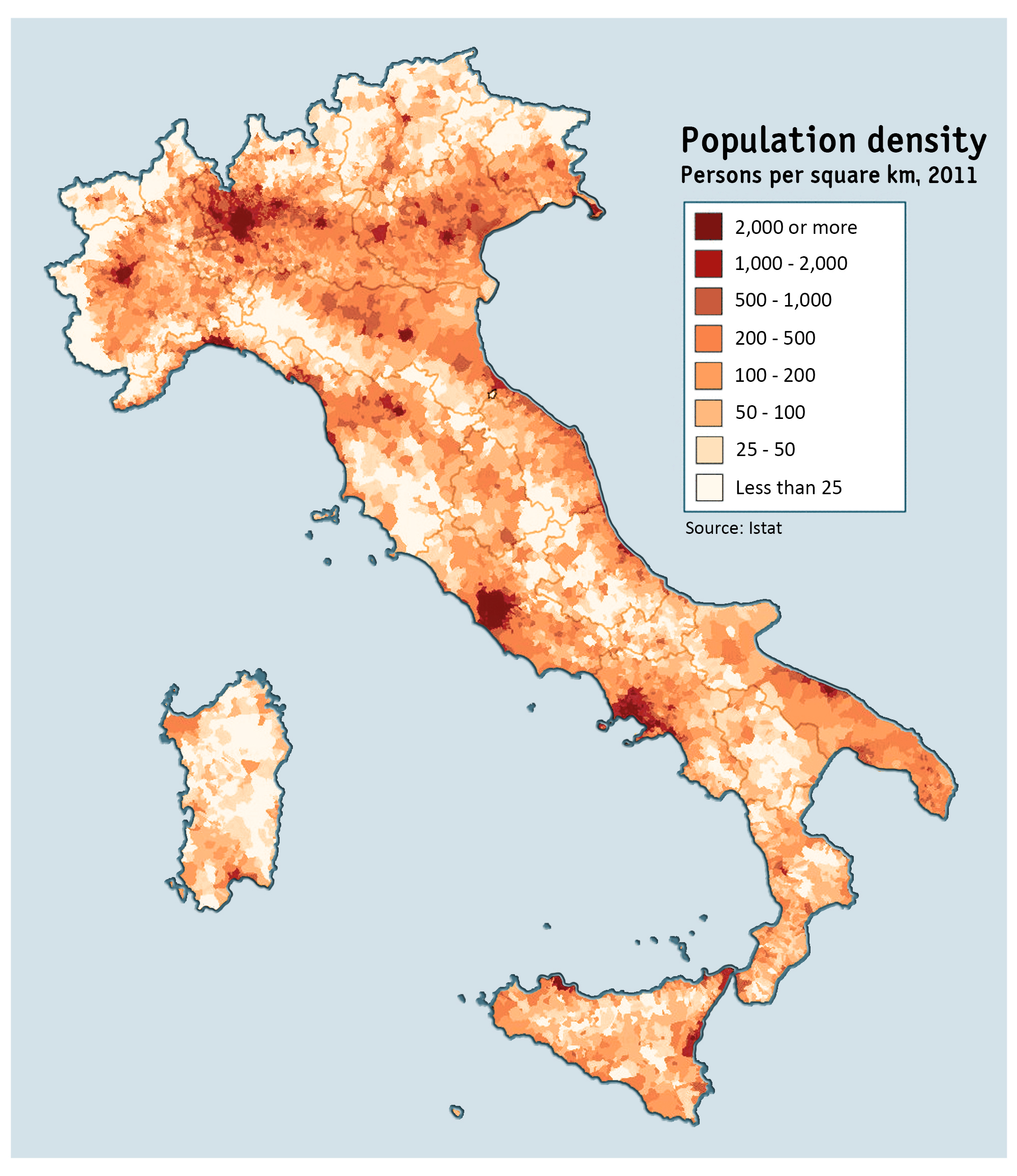
A map of Italy's population density at the 2011 census

Metropolitan cities and larger urban zone
Metropolitan city	Region	Area (km^{2})	Population (1 January 2025)	Functional Urban Areas (FUA) Population (2016)
Rome	Lazio	5,352	4,223,885	4,414,288
Milan	Lombardy	1,575	3,247,623	5,111,481
Naples	Campania	1,171	2,958,410	3,418,061
Turin	Piedmont	6,829	2,207,873	1,769,475
Palermo	Sicily	5,009	1,194,439	1,033,226
Bari	Apulia	3,821	1,218,191	749,723
Catania	Sicily	3,574	1,058,563	658,805
Florence	Tuscany	3,514	989,460	807,896
Bologna	Emilia-Romagna	3,702	1,020,865	775,247
Genoa	Liguria	1,839	818,651	713,243
Venice	Veneto	2,462	833,934	561,697
Messina	Sicily	3,266	595,948	273,680
Reggio Calabria	Calabria	3,183	511,935	221,139
Cagliari	Sardinia	1,248	417,079	488,954

== Vital statistics ==
=== Statistics since 1862 ===
Notable events in Italian demography:

- 1867, 1880, 1911 – Major Cholera outbreaks
- 1908 – Messina earthquake
- 1915–1918 – World War I
- 1940–1945 – World War II
- 2020–2023 – COVID-19 pandemic

	Average population (1 January)	Live births	Deaths	Natural change	Crude birth rate (per 1,000)	Crude death rate (per 1,000)	Natural change (per 1,000)	Crude migration change (per 1,000)	Total fertility rates (Note: In fertility rates, 2.1 and above is a stable population and has been marked blue, 2 and below leads to an aging population and the result is that the population decreases.)
1862	26,328,000	991,000	815,000	176,000	37.7	30.9	6.7		4.93
1863	26,507,000	1,026,000	824,000	202,000	38.7	31.1	7.6	−0.9	4.90
1864	26,712,000	1,000,000	802,000	198,000	37.4	30.0	7.4	0.3	4.90
1865	26,915,000	1,024,000	812,000	212,000	38.0	30.1	7.9	−0.3	4.91
1866	27,131,000	1,044,000	798,000	246,000	38.5	29.4	9.1	−1.1	4.91
1867	27,381,000	991,000	935,000	56,000	36.2	34.1	2.0	7.1	4.92
1868	27,440,000	964,000	844,000	120,000	35.1	30.8	4.4	−2.2	4.92
1869	27,561,000	1,016,000	777,000	239,000	36.9	28.2	8.7	−4.3	4.91
1870	27,801,000	1,016,000	840,000	176,000	36.5	30.2	6.3	2.3	4.90
1871	27,974,000	1,026,000	845,000	181,000	36.7	30.2	6.5	−0.3	4.90
1872	28,151,000	1,060,000	868,000	192,000	37.7	30.9	6.8	−0.5	4.89
1873	28,314,000	1,023,000	854,000	169,000	36.1	30.1	6.0	−0.2	4.88
1874	28,459,000	985,000	868,000	117,000	34.6	30.5	4.1	1.0	4.89
1875	28,551,000	1,072,000	885,000	187,000	37.5	31.0	6.5	−3.3	4.90
1876	28,709,000	1,121,000	835,000	286,000	39.0	29.1	10.0	−4.5	4.90
1877	28,964,000	1,063,000	823,000	240,000	36.7	28.4	8.3	0.5	4.91
1878	29,169,000	1,046,000	850,000	196,000	35.8	29.1	6.7	0.3	4.92
1879	29,334,000	1,097,000	873,000	224,000	37.4	29.7	7.6	−2.0	4.95
1880	29,516,000	989,000	906,000	83,000	33.5	30.7	2.8	3.4	4.98
1881	29,552,000	1,112,000	819,000	293,000	37.7	27.7	9.9	−8.7	5.00
1882	29,791,000	1,090,000	825,000	265,000	36.6	27.7	8.9	−0.9	5.03
1883	30,005,000	1,101,000	830,000	271,000	36.7	27.7	9.0	−1.9	5.06
1884	30,221,000	1,162,000	816,000	346,000	38.5	27.0	11.4	−4.3	5.05
1885	30,511,000	1,156,000	823,000	333,000	37.9	27.0	10.9	−1.4	5.04
1886	30,776,000	1,117,000	882,000	235,000	36.3	28.7	7.6	1.0	5.04
1887	30,937,000	1,184,000	864,000	320,000	38.2	27.9	10.4	−5.2	5.03
1888	31,160,000	1,149,000	855,000	294,000	36.9	27.4	9.4	−2.3	5.02
1889	31,325,000	1,178,000	801,000	377,000	37.6	25.6	12.0	−6.8	4.98
1890	31,611,000	1,110,000	830,000	280,000	35.1	26.2	8.9	0.2	4.95
1891	31,792,000	1,159,000	829,000	330,000	36.5	26.1	10.4	−4.7	4.92
1892	31,992,000	1,137,000	837,000	300,000	35.6	26.2	9.4	−3.1	4.88
1893	32,189,000	1,154,000	809,000	345,000	35.9	25.2	10.7	−4.6	4.84
1894	32,417,000	1,130,000	808,000	322,000	34.9	24.9	10.0	−2.9	4.79
1895	32,608,000	1,120,000	817,000	303,000	34.4	25.1	9.3	−3.4	4.74
1896	32,770,000	1,123,000	790,000	333,000	34.3	24.1	10.2	−5.2	4.69
1897	32,955,000	1,128,000	725,000	403,000	34.2	22.0	12.2	−6.6	4.64
1898	33,200,000	1,097,000	762,000	335,000	33.0	22.9	10.1	−2.7	4.59
1899	33,369,000	1,116,000	734,000	382,000	33.5	22.0	11.4	−6.4	4.56
1900	32,377,000	1,067,376	768,917	298,459	33.0	23.7	9.2	−3.9	4.53
1901	32,550,000	1,057,763	715,036	342,727	32.5	22.0	10.5	−3.2	4.49
1902	32,787,000	1,093,074	727,181	365,893	33.3	22.2	11.2	−4.6	4.46
1903	33,004,000	1,042,090	736,311	305,779	31.6	22.3	9.3	−2.2	4.43
1904	33,237,000	1,085,431	698,604	386,827	32.7	21.0	11.6	−4.0	4.44
1905	33,489,000	1,084,518	730,340	354,178	32.4	21.8	10.6	−3.8	4.45
1906	33,718,000	1,070,978	696,875	374,103	31.8	20.7	11.1	−4.2	4.45
1907	33,952,000	1,062,333	700,333	362,000	31.3	20.6	10.7	−3.5	4.46
1908	34,198,000	1,138,813	770,054	368,759	33.3	22.5	10.8	−3.3	4.47
1909	34,455,000	1,115,831	738,460	377,371	32.4	21.4	11.0	−2.4	4.43
1910	34,751,000	1,144,410	682,459	461,951	32.9	19.6	13.3	−5.2	4.39
1911	35,033,000	1,093,545	742,811	350,734	31.2	21.2	10.0	−3.9	4.36
1912	35,246,000	1,133,985	635,788	498,197	32.2	18.0	14.1	−11.1	4.32
1913	35,351,000	1,122,482	663,966	458,516	31.8	18.8	13.0	−3.1	4.28
1914	35,701,000	1,114,091	643,355	470,736	31.2	18.0	13.2	2.8	4.04
1915	36,271,000	1,109,183	809,703	299,480	30.6	22.3	8.3	−2.5	3.80
1916	36,481,000	881,626	854,703	26,923	24.2	23.4	0.7	−4.5	3.56
1917	36,343,000	691,207	948,710	−257,503	19.6	26.1	−7.1	−4.5	3.32
1918	35,922,000	640,263	1,268,290	−628,027	18.2	35.3	−17.5	11.8	3.08
1919	35,717,000	770,620	676,329	94,291	21.6	18.9	2.6	4.2	3.24
1920	35,960,000	1,158,041	681,749	476,292	32.2	19.0	13.2	39.9	3.41
1921	37,869,000	1,118,344	670,234	448,110	30.7	17.7	13.0	−4.4	3.57
1922	38,196,000	1,127,444	690,054	437,390	30.8	18.1	12.7	−2.9	3.74
1923	38,571,000	1,107,505	654,827	452,678	29.9	17.0	11.7	−2.5	3.90
1924	38,927,000	1,124,470	663,077	461,393	28.9	17.0	11.9	−3.2	3.81
1925	39,265,000	1,109,761	669,695	440,066	28.2	17.1	11.2	−2.9	3.72
1926	39,590,000	1,094,587	680,274	414,313	27.7	17.2	10.5	−2.0	3.64
1927	39,926,000	1,093,772	639,843	453,929	27.4	16.0	11.4	−2.5	3.55
1928	40,281,000	1,072,316	645,654	426,662	26.6	16.0	10.6	−2.5	3.46
1929	40,607,000	1,037,700	667,223	370,477	25.6	16.4	9.1	−0.5	3.42
1930	40,956,000	1,092,678	576,751	515,927	26.7	14.1	12.6	−3.2	3.38
1931	41,339,000	1,026,197	609,405	416,792	24.8	14.7	10.1	−4.2	3.21
1932	41,584,000	990,995	610,646	380,349	23.8	14.7	9.1	−0.8	3.06
1933	41,928,000	995,979	574,113	421,866	23.8	13.7	10.1	−1.8	3.04
1934	42,277,000	992,966	563,339	429,627	23.5	13.3	10.2	−1.8	3.00
1935	42,631,000	996,708	594,722	401,986	23.4	14.0	9.4	−1.6	2.98
1936	42,965,000	962,686	593,380	369,306	22.4	13.8	8.6	−1.5	2.87
1937	43,269,000	991,867	618,290	373,577	22.9	14.3	8.6	−1.0	2.93
1938	43,596,000	1,037,180	614,988	422,192	23.8	14.1	9.7	0	3.05
1939	44,018,000	1,040,213	591,483	448,730	23.6	13.4	10.2	0	3.07
1940	44,467,000	1,046,479	606,907	439,572	23.5	13.6	9.9	−1.7	3.07
1941	44,830,000	937,546	621,735	315,811	20.9	13.9	7.0	−1.0	2.74
1942	45,098,000	926,063	643,607	282,456	20.5	14.3	6.3	−16.4	2.69
1943	44,641,000	882,105	679,708	202,397	19.8	15.2	4.5	−1.1	2.61
1944	44,794,000	814,746	685,171	129,575	18.3	15.3	2.9	0.5	2.39
1945	44,946,000	815,678	615,092	200,586	18.2	13.7	4.5	2.3	2.37
1946	45,253,000	1,036,098	547,952	488,146	23.0	12.1	10.8	−2.2	3.01
1947	45,641,000	1,011,490	524,019	487,471	22.2	11.5	10.8	5.4	2.89
1948	46,381,000	1,005,851	490,450	515,401	21.8	10.6	11.2	−3.6	2.83
1949	46,733,000	937,146	485,277	451,869	20.1	10.4	9.7	−1.8	2.62
1950	47,104,000	908,622	455,169	453,453	19.3	9.7	9.6	−3.0	2.50
1951	47,417,000	860,998	485,208	375,790	18.2	10.2	7.9	−2.6	2.35
1952	47,666,000	863,661	488,470	375,191	17.7	10.0	7.7	−1.6	2.34
1953	47,957,000	860,345	484,527	375,818	17.5	9.9	7.6	−0.5	2.31
1954	48,299,000	881,845	445,902	435,943	18.0	9.1	8.9	−2.0	2.35
1955	48,633,000	879,130	449,058	430,072	17.9	9.2	8.7	−2.8	2.33
1956	48,920,000	884,043	499,504	384,539	17.9	10.2	7.7	−2.4	2.34
1957	49,181,000	885,812	483,558	402.254	17.9	9.8	8.0	−2.0	2.33
1958	49,475,000	880,361	459,366	420,995	17.6	9.3	8.3	−1.1	2.31
1959	49,831,000	910,628	454,547	456,081	18.1	9.1	9.0	−1.6	2.38
1960	50,198,000	923,004	480,848	442,156	18.1	9.6	8.6	−2.1	2.41
1961	50,523,000	924,203	460,009	464,194	18.4	9.3	9.1	−2.1	2.41
1962	50,878,000	945,842	503,106	442,736	18.4	10.0	8.4	−1.1	2.46
1963	51,251,000	978,143	514,000	464,143	18.8	10.1	8.7	−0.4	2.56
1964	51,675,000	1,035,207	488,601	546,606	19.7	9.5	10.2	−1.7	2.70
1965	52,112,000	1,017,944	516,922	501,022	19.1	10.0	9.1	−1.3	2.66
1966	52,518,000	999,316	493,562	505,754	18.7	9.5	9.2	−1.9	2.62
1967	52,900,000	962,197	507,845	454,352	18.0	9.7	8.3	−2.0	2.53
1968	53,235,000	944,837	530,738	414,099	17.6	10.1	7.5	−1.8	2.49
1969	53,538,000	949,155	530,348	418,807	17.5	10.1	7.4	−2.1	2.51
1970	53,821,000	917,496	528,622	388,874	16.8	9.7	7.1	−2.4	2.42
1971	54,073,000	911,084	515,318	395,766	16.8	9.7	7.1	−1.4	2.41
1972	54,381,000	893,061	518,020	375,041	16.3	9.6	6.7	0.1	2.36
1973	54,751,000	887,953	544,461	343,492	16.0	10.0	6.0	0.6	2.34
1974	55,111,000	886,310	532,753	353,557	15.8	9.7	6.1	−0.1	2.33
1975	55,441,000	841,858	556,019	285,839	14.9	10.0	4.9	0.1	2.20
1976	55,718,000	806,358	556,143	250,215	14.0	9.9	4.1	0.2	2.11
1977	55,955,000	757,281	547,011	210,270	13.2	9.8	3.5	0.1	1.97
1978	56,155,000	720,545	539,685	180,860	12.6	9.6	3.0	−0.1	1.87
1979	56,318,000	682,742	541,825	140,917	11.9	9.6	2.3	−0.2	1.76
1980	56,434,000	657,278	559,376	97,902	11.3	9.8	1.5	−0.3	1.68
1981	56,502,000	628,113	540,764	87,349	11.0	9.7	1.4	−0.7	1.60
1982	56,544,000	634,678	537,727	96,951	10.9	9.5	1.5	−1.1	1.60
1983	56,564,000	612,936	563,807	49,129	10.6	10.0	0.7	−0.5	1.54
1984	56,577,000	597,560	535,661	61,899	10.4	9.5	0.9	−0.6	1.48
1985	56,593,000	589,233	549,529	39,704	10.2	9.7	0.5	−0.4	1.45
1986	56,596,000	562,512	545,189	17,323	9.8	9.5	0.3	−0.2	1.37
1987	56,602,000	560,265	534,993	25,272	9.7	9.3	0.5	0	1.35
1988	56,629,000	577,856	537,545	40,311	10.1	9.5	0.5	0.3	1.38
1989	56,672,000	567,268	531,557	35,711	9.9	9.4	0.5	0.3	1.35
1990	56,719,000	580,761	544,397	36,364	10.0	9.6	0.5	0.2	1.36
1991	56,759,000	556,175	547,131	9,044	9.9	9.8	0.2	0.5	1.32
1992	56,797,000	575,216	545,038	30,178	10.0	9.6	0.4	0.2	1.32
1993	56,832,000	552,587	555,043	−2,456	9.7	9.7	−0.1	0.3	1.26
1994	56,843,000	536,665	557,513	−20,848	9.4	9.8	−0.4	0.4	1.22
1995	56,844,000	526,064	555,203	−29,139	9.2	9.8	−0.5	0.8	1.19
1996	56,860,000	536,740	557,756	−21,016	9.3	9.8	−0.5	1.0	1.22
1997	56,890,000	540,048	564,679	−24,631	9.4	9.9	−0.5	0.8	1.23
1998	56,907,000	532,843	576,911	−44,068	9.3	10.1	−0.8	1.0	1.21
1999	56,917,000	537,242	571,356	−34,114	9.4	10.0	−0.5	0.9	1.23
2000	56,942,000	543,039	560,241	−17,202	9.5	9.8	−0.3	0.9	1.26
2001	56,974,000	535,282	548,254	−12,972	9.4	9.8	−0.4	1.9	1.25
2002	57,059,000	538,198	557,393	−19,195	9.4	9.8	−0.4	4.9	1.27
2003	57,313,000	544,063	586,468	−42,405	9.5	10.3	−0.7	7.2	1.29
2004	57,685,000	562,599	546,658	15,941	9.8	9.5	0.3	4.6	1.34
2005	57,969,000	554,022	567,304	−13,282	9.5	9.8	−0.2	3.2	1.33
2006	58,144,000	560,010	557,892	2,118	9.6	9.6	0.0	5.1	1.37
2007	58,438,000	563,933	570,801	−6,868	9.6	9.8	−0.2	6.9	1.39
2008	58,827,000	576,659	585,126	−8,467	9.8	9.9	−0.1	4.7	1.44
2009	59,095,000	568,857	591,663	−22,806	9.6	9.8	−0.3	3.4	1.44
2010	59,277,000	561,944	587,488	−25,544	9.4	9.7	−0.3	2.0	1.44
2011	59,379,000	546,585	593,402	−46,817	9.1	9.9	−0.8	3.5	1.44
2012	59,540,000	534,186	612,883	−78,697	8.9	10.2	−1.3	13.0	1.42
2013	60,234,000	514,308	600,744	−86,436	8.5	10.0	−1.4	10.6	1.39
2014	60,789,000	502,596	598,364	−95,768	8.3	9.9	−1.6	1.7	1.38
2015	60,796,000	485,780	647,571	−161,791	8.1	10.7	−2.7	0.6	1.36
2016	60,666,000	473,438	615,261	−141,823	7.9	10.2	−2.4	1.0	1.36
2017	60,579,000	458,151	649,061	−190,910	7.6	10.8	−3.2	1.6	1.34
2018	60,484,000	439,747	633,133	−193,386	7.3	10.6	−3.2	−7.8	1.31
2019	59,816,673	420,084	634,417	−214,333	7.0	10.6	−3.6	0.7	1.27
2020	59,641,488	404,892	740,317	−335,425	6.8	12.4	−5.6	−1.2	1.24
2021	59,236,213	400,249	701,346	−301,097	6.8	11.8	−5.2	1.7	1.25
2022	59,030,133	393,333	715,077	−321,744	6.8	12.1	−5.4	4.8	1.24
2023	58,997,201	379,890	671,065	−291,175	6.4	11.2	−4.8	4.7	1.20
2024	58,971,230	369,944	653,109	−283,165	6.3	10.8	−4.5	4.1	1.18
2025	58,943,464	355,772	651,830	−296,058	6.0	11.1	−5.1	5.0	1.14
2026	58,942,828								

In 2025, 80,442 babies were born to at least one foreign parent, which was 22.61 percent of all newborns in that year. 20,528 or 5.77 percent were born to foreign mothers, 10,912 or 3.07 percent to foreign fathers, and 49,002 or 13.77 percent to two foreign parents. In Southern Italy, including Sicily and Sardinia, 10.26 percent of all newborns had 1 or 2 foreign parents. In Central and Northern Italy, their share was 24.66 and 31.2 percent, respectively.

=== Current vital statistics ===
Period	Live births	Deaths	Natural change
January—August 2025	230,636	432,753	–202,117
January—August 2026	227,718	438,791	–211,073
Difference	▼ –2,918 (–1.3%)	▲ +6,038 (+1.4%)	▼ –8,956

=== Total fertility rates by region ===
Total fertility rate (TFR) in Italy by region as of 2025:

2025
Region	TFR
Trentino-Alto Adige	1.40
Sicily	1.22
Campania	1.22
Calabria	1.19
Veneto	1.16
Lombardy	1.16
Friuli-Venezia Giulia	1.15
Emilia-Romagna	1.14
Italy	1.14
Apulia	1.11
Liguria	1.11
Marche	1.11
Aosta Valley	1.11
Piedmont	1.10
Tuscany	1.08
Basilicata	1.08
Abruzzo	1.07
Lazio	1.06
Umbria	1.06
Molise	1.02
Sardinia	0.85

==== Total fertility rates by province ====
2025
Provinces	TFR
Bolzano	1.54
Gorizia	1.35
Reggio Calabria	1.28
Catania	1.27
Palermo	1.27
Trapani	1.27
Ragusa	1.26
Piacenza	1.26
Agrigento	1.25
Napoli	1.25
Caserta	1.25
Crotone	1.24
Modena	1.24
Cuneo	1.24
Trentino	1.24
Vicenza	1.23
Treviso	1.23
Vibo Valentia	1.22
Brescia	1.21
Cremona	1.21
Reggio nell'Emilia	1.20
Bergamo	1.20
Parma	1.20
Salerno	1.18
Mantua	1.18
Pordenone	1.18
Barletta-Andria-Trani	1.18
Vercelli	1.18
Sondrio	1.17
Lecco	1.17
Verona	1.17
Foggia	1.17
Siracusa	1.17
Novara	1.16
Varese	1.16
Pavia	1.16
Caltanissetta	1.15
Monza and Brianza	1.15
Genova	1.15
Matera	1.15
Trieste	1.14
Macerata	1.14
Ancona	1.14
Italy	1.14
Arezzo	1.13
Catanzaro	1.13
Milano	1.13
Lodi	1.12
Como	1.12
Siena	1.12
Pisa	1.12
Cosenza	1.12
Enna	1.12
Belluno	1.11
Latina	1.11
Ascoli Piceno	1.11
Aosta Valley	1.11
Forlì-Cesena	1.10
Bari	1.10
Venice	1.10
Firenze	1.10
Ferrara	1.10
Asti	1.09
Bologna	1.09
Alessandria	1.09
Pistoia	1.09
Rovigo	1.09
Padova	1.08
Udine	1.08
Benevento	1.08
Lecce	1.08
Taranto	1.08
Pescara	1.08
Terni	1.08
Avellino	1.08
Pesaro e Urbino	1.08
Ravenna	1.07
Rieti	1.07
Teramo	1.07
Chieti	1.07
Messina	1.07
Savona	1.07
L'Aquila	1.06
Torino	1.06
Roma	1.06
Perugia	1.06
Imperia	1.05
Verbano-Cusio-Ossola	1.05
La Spezia	1.04
Livorno	1.04
Potenza	1.04
Biella	1.04
Grosseto	1.03
Lucca	1.03
Fermo	1.03
Brindisi	1.02
Massa-Carrara	1.02
Campobasso	1.02
Isernia	1.02
Prato	1.01
Frosinone	1.00
Rimini	0.99
Nuoro	0.99
Viterbo	0.98
Sassari	0.89
Sud Sardegna	0.84
Oristano	0.80
Cagliari	0.74

=== Structure of the population ===
Population Estimates by Sex and Age Group (01.I.2021):

Age group	Male	Female	Total	%
Total	28 866 226	30 369 987	59 236 213	100
0–4	1 138 845	1 077 665	2 216 510	3.74
5–9	1 326 061	1 252 279	2 578 340	4.35
10–14	1 463 873	1 377 822	2 841 695	4.80
15–19	1 476 815	1 380 198	2 857 013	4.82
20–24	1 549 500	1 407 840	2 957 340	4.99
25–29	1 566 265	1 479 314	3 045 579	5.14
30–34	1 633 887	1 592 259	3 226 146	5.45
35–39	1 747 529	1 735 723	3 483 252	5.88
40–44	2 001 502	2 007 068	4 008 570	6.77
45–49	2 329 457	2 363 044	4 692 501	7.92
50–54	2 377 041	2 440 634	4 817 675	8.13
55–59	2 261 108	2 362 857	4 623 965	7.81
60–64	1 901 209	2 044 887	3 946 096	6.66
65–69	1 652 948	1 821 385	3 474 333	5.87
70–74	1 609 510	1 831 661	3 441 171	5.81
75–79	1 140 634	1 406 576	2 547 210	4.30
80–84	953 118	1 324 845	2 277 963	3.85
85–89	513 213	882 889	1 396 102	2.36
90–94	186 194	443 464	629 658	1.06
95–99	34 670	123 247	157 917	0.27
100–104	2 728	13 404	16 132	0.03
105–109	117	907	1 024	<0.01
110+	2	19	21	<0.01
Age group	Male	Female	Total	Percent
0–14	3 928 779	3 707 766	7 636 545	12.89
15–64	18 844 313	18 813 824	37 658 137	63.57
65+	6 093 134	7 848 397	13 941 531	23.54

== Health ==
Obesity – adult prevalence rate

19.9% (2016) Country comparison to the world: 108

== Employment and income ==
Unemployment, youth ages 15–24:

total: 32.2%. Country comparison to the world: 26th
male: 30.4%
female: 34.8% (2018 est.)

== Immigration ==
Italian and foreign residents, as of January 1st of 2026.

Since the fall of the Berlin Wall in 1989, and the 2004 and 2007 enlargements of the European Union, Italy received growing flows of migrants from the former socialist countries of Eastern Europe, especially Romania, Albania, Ukraine and Poland. The second most important area of immigration to Italy has always been North Africa, especially Morocco, Egypt, Tunisia and Algeria. In recent years, growing migration fluxes from the Far East (notably, China and the Philippines) and Latin America (Ecuador, Peru) have been recorded.

Italy does not collect data on ethnicity or race of the country, but does collect data on nationality of its residents.

In 2021, Istat estimated that 5,171,894 foreign citizens lived in Italy, representing about 8.7% of the total population. These figures do not include naturalized foreign-born residents (121,457 foreigners acquired Italian citizenship in 2021) or illegal immigrants, the so-called clandestini, whose numbers, difficult to determine, are thought to be at least 670,000. Romanians made up the largest community in Italy (1,145,718, around 10% of them being ethnic Romani people), followed by Albanians (441,027) and Moroccans (422,980).

In 2019, the fourth largest community of foreign residents in Italy were Chinese. The majority of Chinese living in Italy are from the city of Wenzhou in the province of Zhejiang. Breaking down the foreign-born population by continent, in 2020 the figures were as follows: Europe (54%), Africa (22%), Asia (16%), the Americas (8%) and Oceania (0.06%). The distribution of immigrants is largely uneven: 83% of immigrants live in the northern and central parts of Italy, the most economically developed areas. 17% live in the southern half of Italy.

Net migration rate
3.21 migrant(s)/1,000 population (2021 est.) Country comparison to the world: 34th

Nationality groups	2002		2005		2010		2015		2019		2021		2023		2025	
Nationality groups	Number	%	Number	%	Number	%	Number	%	Number	%	Number	%	Number	%	Number	%
(Italy) Italians	55,651,856	97.64	55,775,350	96.09	55,853,967	93.57	55,460,252	91.98	54,820,515	91.65	54,064,319	91.27	53,855,860	91.29	53,383,937	90.57
Foreigners	1,341,414	2.36	2,269,018	3.91	3,836,349	6.43	4,835,245	8.02	4,996,158	8.35	5,171,894	8.73	5,141,341	8.71	5,559,527	9.43
(European Union) EU-27	–	–	–	–	–	–	–	–	1,472,847	2.46%	1,406,623	2.47%	1,393,782	2.36%		
Other European	–	–	–	–	–	–	–	–	1,036,761	1.73%	1,053,765	1.78%	1,024,029	1.74%		
Northern Africa	–	–	–	–	–	–	–	–	639,994	1.07%	689,649	1.16%	689,083	1.17%		
Central and South Asia	–	–	–	–	–	–	–	–	528,182	0.88%	605,000	1.02%	619,671	1.05%		
Eastern Asia	–	–	–	–	–	–	–	–	464,557	0.78%	521,686	0.88%	489,804	0.83%		
Western Africa	–	–	–	–	–	–	–	–	389,602	0.65%	400,112	0.68%	401,218	0.68%		
Central and South America	–	–	–	–	–	–	–	–	345,466	0.58%	366,062	0.62%	370,415	0.63%		
Western Asia	–	–	–	–	–	–	–	–	36,914	–	44,272	–	71,761	–		
Eastern Africa	–	–	–	–	–	–	–	–	37,131	–	35,486	–	35,833	–		
Central and South Africa	–	–	–	–	–	–	–	–	24,919	–	25,343	–	25,299	–		
Northern America	–	–	–	–	–	–	–	–	17,082	–	21,216	–	17,812	–		
Oceania	–	–	–	–	–	–	–	–	2,120	–	2,248	–	1,991	–		
Stateless	–	–	–	–	–	–	–	–	583	–	432	–	643	–		
Total	56,993,270	100	58,044,368	100	59,690,316	100	60,295,497	100	59,816,673	100	59,236,213	100	58,997,201	100	58,943,464	100

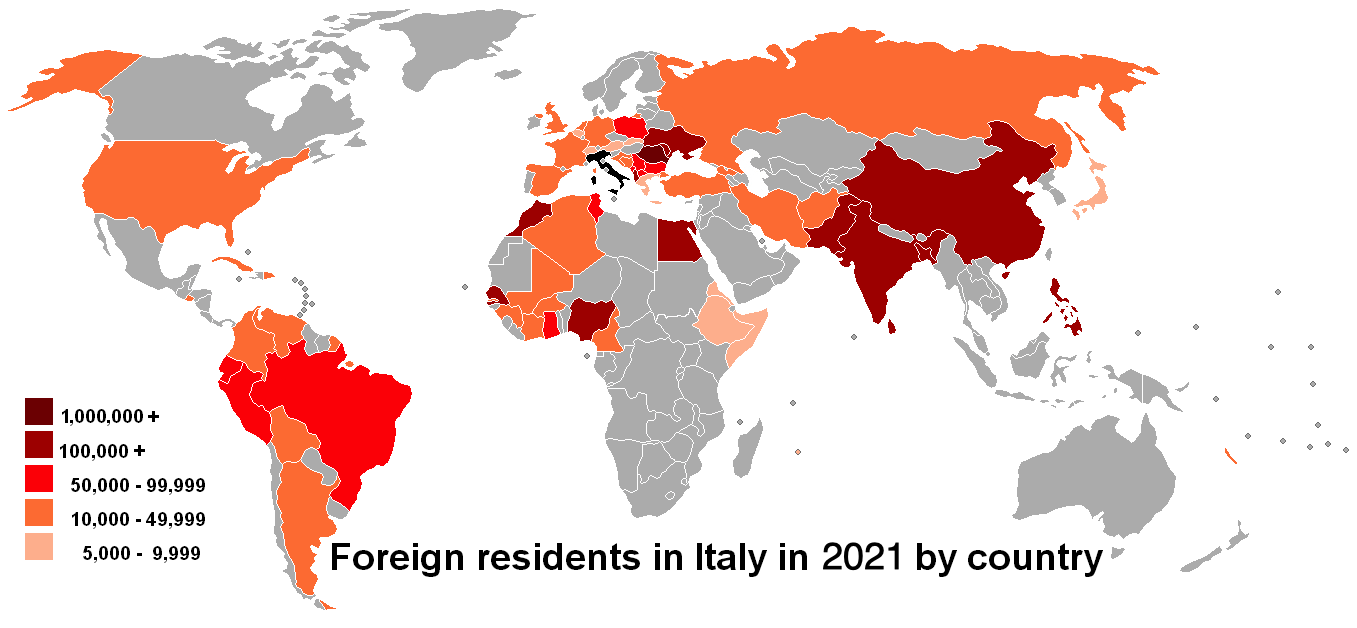
Foreign residents in Italy in 2021, by country

Total foreign resident population on 1 January (Note: The figures for 2002–2011 have been revised downwards as a result of the 15th General Census of Italy which offered more precise data. The figures since 2012 are calculated adding to the foreign population enumerated by the census the foreign population inflows and outflows recorded in all Italian municipalities during each calendar year.)
Year	Population	Ref.
2002	1,341,209	
2003	1,464,663	
2004	1,854,748	
2005	2,210,478	
2006	2,419,483	
2007	2,592,950	
2008	3,023,317	
2009	3,402,435	
2010	3,648,128	
2011	3,879,224	
2012	4,052,081	
2013	4,387,721	
2014	4,922,085	
2015	5,014,437	
2016	5,026,153	
2017	5,047,028	
2018	5,144,440	
2019	5,255,503	
2020	5,171,894	
2021	5,030,716	
2022	5,141,341	
2023	5,253,658	
2024	5,371,251	

In 2022, there were 5,030,716 Foreign-born residents, accounting for 8.5% of the total population.

Their distribution by country of origin was as follows:

Country	Population
(European Union) Romania	1,053,042
Albania	414,622
Morocco	412,457
China	311,250
Ukraine	287,187
Bangladesh	213,622
India	171,429
Philippines	153,455
Egypt	174,141
Pakistan	171,179
Nigeria	132,129
Senegal	119,067
Sri Lanka	113,705
Moldova	94,141
Tunisia	123,828
Peru	116,169
(European Union) Poland	72,212
Ecuador	57,980
Brazil	54,338
North Macedonia	47,372
(European Union) Bulgaria	47,465
Ghana	46,327
Russia	43,119
Kosovo	36,180
(European Union) Germany	36,427
Serbia	28,426
(European Union) France	31,956
Dominican Republic	30,200
Georgia	36,490
Ivory Coast	35,436
(European Union) Spain	30,074
United Kingdom	25,745
Cuba	26,476
El Salvador	25,880
Gambia	28,598
Mali	27,214
Colombia	26,395
Bosnia and Herzegovina	18,600

=== Italy migration data ===
Italy Migration Data of Italian nationals (1971–2014)
Year	Emigration	Immigration	Net Migration
1971	167,721	128,572	−39,149
1972	141,852	138,246	−3,606
1973	123,802	125,168	1,366
1974	112,020	116,708	4,688
1975	92,666	122,774	30,108
1976	97,247	115,997	18,750
1977	87,655	101,985	14,330
1978	85,550	89,897	4,347
1979	88,950	91,693	2,743
1980	84,877	90,463	5,586
1981	89,221	88,886	−335
1982	98,241	92,423	−5,818
1983	85,138	87,804	2,666
1984	77,318	77,002	−316
1985	66,737	67,277	540
1986	57,862	56,006	−1,856
1987	38,305	57,665	19,360
1988	36,660	52,562	15,902
1989	59,894	53,893	−6,001
1990	48,916	70,035	21,119
1991	51,478	56,004	4,526
1992	50,226	54,849	4,623
1993	54,980	49,261	−5,719
1994	59,402	46,761	−12,641
1995	34,886	28,472	−6,414
1996	39,017	28,816	−10,201
1997	38,984	30,352	−8,632
1998	38,148	29,946	−8,202
1999	56,283	32,152	−24,131
2000	47,480	34,411	−13,069
2001	46,901	35,416	−11,485
2002	34,056	44,476	10,420
2003	39,866	47,530	7,664
2004	39,155	41,794	2,639
2005	41,991	37,326	−4,665
2006	46,308	37,666	−8,642
2007	36,299	36,693	394
2008	39,536	32,118	−7,418
2009	39,024	29,330	−9,694
2010	39,545	28,192	−11,353
2011	50,057	31,466	−18,591
2012	67,998	29,467	−38,531
2013	82,095	28,433	−53,662
2014	88,859	29,271	−59,588

Italy Immigration and Emigration Data
Year	Immigration	Emigration	Net Migration
2002	213,202	41,756	171,446
2003	440,301	48,706	391,595
2004	414,880	49,910	364,970
2005	304,960	53,931	251,029
2006	279,714	58,407	221,307
2007	527,123	51,113	476,010
2008	494,394	67,671	426,723
2009	421,859	64,921	356,938
2010	447,744	67,501	380,243
2011	385,793	82,461	303,332
2012	350,772	106,216	244,556
2013	307,454	125,735	181,719
2014	277,631	136,328	141,303
2015	280,078	146,955	133,123
2016	300,823	157,065	143,758
2017	343,440	155,110	188,330
2018	332,324	159,960	172,364
2019	332,778	179,505	153,273
2020	247,526	158,884	88,642
2021	318,366	158,312	160,054
2022	410,985	150,189	260,796
2023	439,658	158,438	281,220
2024	451,583	188,903	262,680
2025	439,916	144,157	295,759

== Languages ==
Local languages spoken in Italy

Italy's official language is Italian. In 2005, there were about 55 million speakers of Italian in Italy and a further 6.7 million outside of it, primarily in the neighboring countries and in the Italian diaspora worldwide. Italian, adopted by the central state after the unification of Italy, is a language based on the Florentine variety of the Tuscan language, and is somewhat intermediate between the Italo-Dalmatian languages and the Gallo-Romance languages. Its development was also influenced by the Germanic languages of the post-Roman invaders. When Italy unified in 1861, 3% of the population spoke Italian. An estimated 90% of Italians speak Italian as their L1 today.

Italy is one of the most linguistically diverse countries in Europe, as there are varieties of Italian specific to each cultural region, and distinct regional and minority languages. The establishment of the national education system has led to the predominance of Italian and a decrease in the use of minority languages. The spread of Italian was further expanded in the 1950s and 1960s, because of the economic growth and the rise of mass media and television, with the state broadcaster (RAI) setting a colloquial variety of Italian to which the population would be exposed.

As a way to distance itself from the Italianization policies promoted because of nationalism, Italy recognized twelve languages as Italy's "historical linguistic minorities", which are promoted alongside Italian in their respective territories. French is co-official in the Aosta Valley as the province's prestige variety, under which the more commonly spoken Franco-Provencal dialects have been historically roofed. German has the same status in the province of Bolzano as, in some parts of that province and in parts of the neighbouring Trentino, does Ladin.

Slovene and Friulian are officially recognised in the provinces of Trieste, Gorizia and Udine in Venezia Giulia. In Sardinia, the Sardinian language has been the language traditionally spoken and is often regarded by linguists as constituting its own branch of Romance. In the 1990s, Sardinian has been recognized as "having equal dignity" with Italian, the introduction of which to the island officially started under the rule of the House of Savoy in the 18th century.

In these regions, official documents are either bilingual, trilingual in Ladin communities, in the co-official languages by default, or available as such upon request. Traffic signs are multilingual. In the Valle d'Aosta, French toponyms are generally used, with the exception of Aosta itself, which has retained its Latin form in Italian and English. Attempts to Italianize them, especially during the Fascist period, have been formally abandoned. Education is possible in minority languages where such schools are operating. UNESCO and other authorities recognize a number of other languages which are not legally protected by Italian government: Piedmontese, Venetian, Ligurian, Lombard, Emilian-Romagnolo, Neapolitan and Sicilian.

== Religion ==
Religion in Italy according to the Eurobarometer survey, 2021
1. Catholicism (79.2%)
2. Eastern Orthodoxy (3.50%)
3. Protestantism (0.30%)
4. Other Christian (1.40%)
5. Islam (1.00%)
6. Buddhism (0.40%)
7. Hinduism (0.30%)
8. Judaism (0.10%)
9. Other (1.40%)
10. Agnosticism (7.50%)
11. Atheism (4.10%)
12. Undeclared (1.00%)
13. Sikhism (0.30%)

Catholicism is by far the largest religion in the country, although the Catholic Church is no longer officially the state religion. In 2006, 87.8% of Italy's population self-identified as Catholic, although only about one-third of these described themselves as active members (36.8%). In 2016, 71.1% of Italian citizens self-identified as Catholic. This increased again to 78% in 2018.

Most Italians believe in God, or a form of a spiritual life force. According to a Eurobarometer Poll in 2005: 74% of Italian citizens responded that 'they believe there is a God', 16% answered that 'they believe there is some sort of spirit or life force' and 6% answered that 'they do not believe there is any sort of spirit, God, or life force'. There are no data collected through census.

=== Christianity ===
The Italian Catholic Church is part of the global Catholic Church, under the leadership of the Pope, curia in Rome, and the Conference of Italian Bishops. In addition to Italy, two other sovereign nations are included in Italian-based dioceses, San Marino and Vatican City. There are 225 dioceses in the Italian Catholic Church, see further in this article and in the article List of Catholic dioceses in Italy. Even though by law Vatican City is not part of Italy, it is in Rome, and along with Latin, Italian is the most spoken and second language of the Roman Curia.

Italy has a rich Catholic culture, especially as numerous Catholic saints, martyrs and popes were Italian themselves. Catholic art in Italy especially flourished during the Middle Ages, Renaissance and Baroque periods, with numerous Italian artists, such as Michelangelo, Leonardo da Vinci, Raphael, Caravaggio, Fra Angelico, Gian Lorenzo Bernini, Sandro Botticelli, Tintoretto, Titian and Giotto. Catholic architecture in Italy is equally as rich and impressive, with churches, basilicas and cathedrals such as St Peter's Basilica, Florence Cathedral and St Mark's Basilica. Catholicism is the largest religion and Christian denomination in Italy, with around 71.1% of Italians considering themselves Catholic. Italy is also home to the greatest number of cardinals in the world, and is the country with the greatest number of Catholic churches per capita.

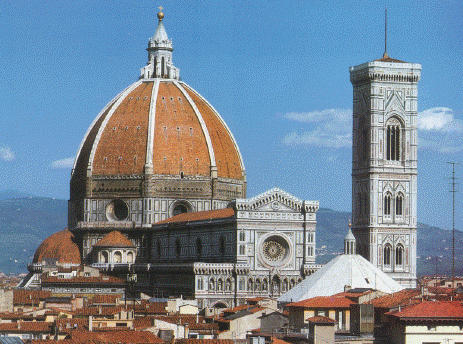
The Santa Maria del Fiore cathedral in Florence, which has the biggest brick dome in the world, and is considered a masterpiece of Italian architecture.

Even though the main Christian denomination in Italy is Catholicism, there are some minorities of Protestant, Waldensian, Eastern Orthodox and other Christian churches.

Immigration from Western, Central, and Eastern Africa at the beginning of the 21st century has increased the size of Baptist, Anglican, Pentecostal and Evangelical communities in Italy, while immigration from Eastern Europe has produced large Eastern Orthodox communities.

In 2006, Protestants made up 2.1% of Italy's population, and members of Eastern Orthodox churches comprised 1.2% or more than 700,000 Eastern Orthodox Christians including 180,000 Greek Orthodox, 550,000 Pentecostals and Evangelists (0.8%), of whom 400,000 are members of the Assemblies of God, about 250,000 are Jehovah's Witnesses (0.4%), 30,000 Waldensians, 25,000 Seventh-day Adventists, 22,000 Mormons, 15,000 Baptists (plus some 5,000 Free Baptists), 7,000 Lutherans, 4,000 Methodists (affiliated with the Waldensian Church).

=== Other religions ===
The longest-established religious faith in Italy is Judaism, Jews having been present in Ancient Rome before the birth of Christ. Italy has seen many influential Italian-Jews, such as prime minister Luigi Luzzatti, who took office in 1910, Ernesto Nathan served as mayor of Rome from 1907 to 1913 and Shabbethai Donnolo (died 982). During the Holocaust, Italy took in many Jewish refugees from Nazi Germany. However, with the creation of the Nazi-backed puppet Italian Social Republic, about 15% of 48,000 Italian Jews were killed. This, together with the emigration that preceded and followed the Second World War, has left only a small community of around 45,000 Jews in Italy today.

Due to immigration from around the world, there has been an increase in non-Christian religions. As of 2009, there were 1.0 million Muslims in Italy forming 1.6 percent of population; independent estimates put the Islamic population in Italy anywhere from 0.8 million to 1.5 million. 50,000 Italian Muslims hold Italian citizenship.

There are more than 200,000 followers of faiths originating in the Indian subcontinent, including some 70,000 Sikhs with 22 gurdwaras across the country, 70,000 Hindus, and 50,000 Buddhists. There were an estimated 4,900 Bahá'ís in Italy in 2005.

== Education ==
Literacy (defined as: ages 15 and over can read and write)

total population: 99.2%
male: 99.4%
female: 99% (2018 est.)

School life expectancy (primary to tertiary education)

total: 16 years
male: 16 years
female: 17 years (2018)

== Genetics and ethnic groups ==
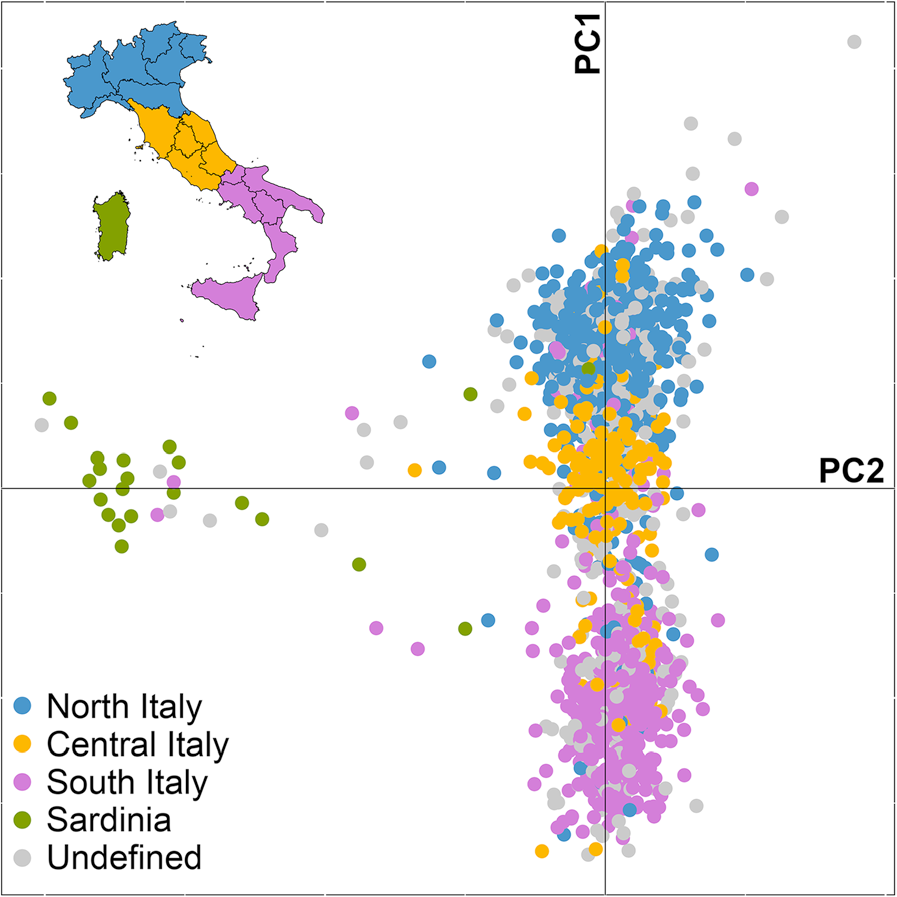
Principal Component Analysis of the Italian population.

The genetic history of Italy is greatly influenced by geography and history. The ancestors of Italians are mostly Indo-European speakers (Italic peoples such as Latins, Umbrians, Samnites, Oscans, Sicels and Adriatic Veneti, as well as Celts, Iapygians and Greeks) and pre-Indo-European speakers (Etruscans, Ligures, Rhaetians and Camunni in mainland Italy, Sicani and Elymians in Sicily and the Nuragic people in Sardinia). During the imperial period of Ancient Rome, the city of Rome hosted a diverse population from across Europe and the Mediterranean. Based on DNA analysis, there is evidence of ancient regional genetic substructure and continuity within modern Italy dating to the pre-Roman and Roman periods.

The Italian population is marked by considerable cultural, linguistic, genetic and historical diversity which results in the presence of several distinct groups throughout the peninsula. In this regard, peoples like the Friulians, the Ladins, the Sardinians and the Tyrolese, who are recognized linguistic minorities, or even the Sicilians who are not, serve as cases in point attesting to such internal diversity.

Linguistic minorities in Italy include Sardu-speakers 1 million, Tyrolese German-speakers 350,000, Albanians 70,000 – 100,000, Slovenes 60,000, Franco-Provençal-speakers 50,000 – 70,000, Occitans 20,000 – 40,000, Ladins 30,000, Catalans 15,000, Greek-speakers 12,000, Croatians 3,000 and Friulians 600,000. The Roma community is one of the largest ethnic minorities in Italy. Due to the lack of disaggregated data the size of the Italian Roma community remains unknown. The Council of Europe estimates that between 120,000 and 180,000 Roma live in Italy. A significant proportion of Roma in Italy do not have Italian citizenship.

== See also ==
- List of Italians
- Italian diaspora
- Italian Americans
- Italian Brazilians
- Italian Argentines
- Italian Venezuelans
- Romani people in Italy
