= Romolo Murri =

Italian politician and ecclesiastic (1870–1944)

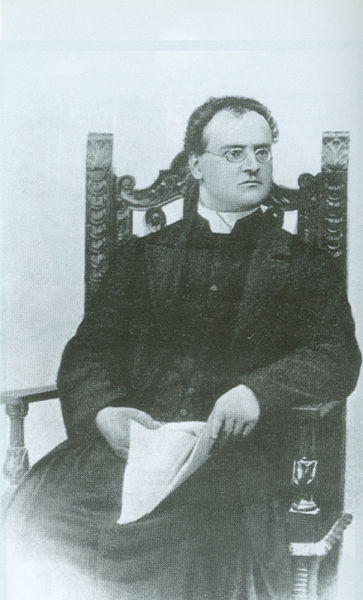
Romolo Murri

Romolo Murri (27 August 1870 – 12 March 1944) was an Italian politician and ecclesiastic. A Catholic priest, he was suspended and later excommunicated for having joined the Lega Democratica Nazionale. For his political activism, he is considered a precursor of Italian Christian democracy and by extension of the Democrazia Cristiana party.

== Biography ==
Murri was born in Monte San Pietrangeli on 27 August 1870. In 1894, he was a promoter of the FUCI, in 1901 of Democrazia Cristiana Italiana and in 1905 of Lega Democratica Nazionale. He founded the publications Vita nova (1895), Cultura sociale (1898), Il domani d'Italia (1901), Rivista di cultura (1906), Il commento (1910).

His activities brought him into controversy with the Holy See, especially after he established the National Democratic League in 1905. Pope Pius X explicitly condemned the movement in 1906 in his encyclical Pieni l'Animo, forbidding all priests from joining it under penalty of suspension a divinis ipso facto.

After failing to comply, Murri was suspended a divinis from his clerical status in 1907. His movement was once again condemned by Pius X in his encyclical Pascendi Dominici gregis, which equated it to modernism, and was finally excommunicated in 1909. On the same year, he was elected to the Chamber of Deputies on the lists of the Italian Radical Party.

In 1912, he married in Rome with Ragnhild Lund, daughter of the former president of Lagting (the upper house of the Norwegian Parliament), with whom he had a son. He failed to be re-elected in 1913, something that was explicitly celebrated by the leader of the Azione Cattolica Count Ottorino Gentiloni. He supported Italy's entry into World War I.

After the rise of the Fascist regime in Italy, Murri withdrew from active politics and devoted himself to journalism, becoming a contributor for Il Resto del Carlino. He showed cautious support for Fascism and the Lateran Treaty of 1929.

In November 1943, he reconciled with the Church and the excommunication was lifted by Pius XII. He died in Rome on 12 March 1944.

== Works ==
In addition to the numerous writings in the aforementioned periodicals in which he participated; Murri wrote some essays.

- Catholic Conservatives and Christian Democrats, 1900
- Class organization and professional unions, 1901
- Battles of today, 1901-1904 [collection of articles published in «Cultura Sociale»]
- Social Summary, 1906
- Clerical politics and democracy, Cesaro, Ascoli Piceno, 1908
- Spain and the Vatican, Milan, Treves Brothers, 1911
- War profiles, Milan: Italian Publishing Institute, 1917
- From Christian Democracy to the Italian Popular Party, 1920
- The ideal conquest of the state, Milan: Imperia, 1923
- Faith and Fascism, Rome, 1924
- The contemporary spiritual crisis. Origins - Orientations, 1932
- Cavour, Rome: Formiggini, 1936
- The universal idea of Rome, Milan: Bompiani, 1937
- The Christian Message and History, 1943
