= Conservative Catholics (Italy) =

Conservative Catholics Cattolici Conservatori
- Leader: Stefano Cavazzoni; Carlo Santucci; Stefano Jacini
- Founded: 1913
- Dissolved: 1919
- Split from: Italian Catholic Electoral Union
- Merged into: Italian People's Party
- Ideology: Conservatism (Italian); Clericalism; Reactionarism
- Political position: Right-wing to far-right

The Conservative Catholics (Italian: Cattolici Conservatori) were a right-wing conservative political party in Italy, composed of strong conservatives and clericalists.

== History ==
A right-wing group of Catholic, conservative, reactionary, legitimist, and anti-liberal inspiration had formed within the Subalpine Parliament of the Kingdom of Sardinia during the so-called "decade of preparation" (the 1850s), in which Camillo Benso di Cavour and his governments prepared for the Second War of Independence and Italian unification by enacting firm secularist and anti-clerical measures aimed at reducing the Church’s social influence in Piedmont and indirectly undermining the Papal States.

It was a phase in which Catholic monarchists of an anti-liberal orientation, opposed to the government's policy of expansion and anticlericalism, grouped themselves into a parliamentary faction distinct from the ordinary Historical Right. The communist leader Antonio Gramsci later referred to this faction in his notes as the "Piedmontese municipalist party".

The Non Expedit was later eased by Pope Pius X, who allowed the election of Catholic candidates loyal to the Holy See to the Italian Parliament through the Gentiloni Pact (1912) with liberal leader Giovanni Giolitti, in exchange for the defense of Catholic values and a common opposition to the rise of socialism. The Gentiloni Pact thus permitted, for the first time since the proclamation of the unitary State, Italian Catholics to organize electorally in Parliament, effectively reviving the ideological framework of the anti-secularist Subalpine party of fifty years earlier.

The Conservative Catholics emerged as a party in 1913 from the right wing of the Italian Catholic Electoral Union. In the 1913 Italian general election, the party won 1.8% of the vote and 9 seats in the Chamber of Deputies. In 1919, they merged with other clerical parties and groupings to form the Italian People's Party, which gained 20.5% and 100 seats in the 1919 Italian general election.

== Electoral results ==
Election	Leader	Chamber of Deputies				
Election	Leader	Votes	%	Seats	+/–	Position
1913	Several	89,630	1.8	9 / 508	▲9	▲9th
