= Gentiloni =

Gentiloni is an Italian surname. Notable people with the surname include:

- Paolo Gentiloni (born 1954), Italian Prime Minister
- Vincenzo Ottorino Gentiloni (1865–1916), Italian politician, known for the
  - Gentiloni pact, 1913 Italian political deal
