= Azione Cattolica =

Widespread Roman Catholic lay association in Italy

AC membership card, 1953. In English, "Catholic Action Men's Union."

The Azione Cattolica Italiana, or Azione Cattolica (English: Catholic Action) for short, is a widespread Roman Catholic lay association in Italy. Members believe that priests have an ethical and religious duty to support the rights of the oppressed and the poor.

== History ==
In Italy in 1905, Azione Cattolica was established as a non-political lay organization under the direct control of bishops. It was established by Pope Pius X after an earlier similar organisation, Opera dei Congressi was disbanded in 1904 by the same pope because many of its members were siding with modernism. The set of events which brought to the foundation of the Azione Cattolica was critical in the excommunication of modernism in 1907 and a prelude to it. The organization was established as a non-political one because the modernists used Catholic lay organizations to promote a political agenda of siding with Italian parties of the left (even of the extreme as per standards of the time). One of the first main leaders of the Azione Cattolica was Count Ottorino Gentiloni.

In 1909 count Gentiloni was appointed by Pope Pius X also as head of UECI, a political Catholic organization, and in such capacity, he co-authored in 1912 with Giovanni Giolitti the Patto Gentiloni which won the Italian elections in 1913.

In the thirties, the original strongly anti-modernist stance of the organization started changing.

Since the organization was forbidden by the Vatican to participate in politics, it was not as much opposed by the fascist regime as it was by the Partito Popolare. Vatican support for Catholic Action resulted in hundreds of thousands of Catholics withdrawing from the Partito Popolare Italiano, and joining the apolitical Catholic Action – causing the Catholic Party's final collapse.

== Other associations related to Azione Cattolica ==
- Movimento Studenti di Azione Cattolica (MSAC)
- Movimento Lavoratori di Azione Cattolica (MLAC)
- Movimento di impegno educativo di Azione Cattolica
- Movimento ecclesiale di impegno culturale (MEIC)
- Italian Catholic Federation of University Students (FUCI)
- Centro Sportivo Italiano (CSI)
