= Ida d'Este =

Italian partisan (1917–1976)

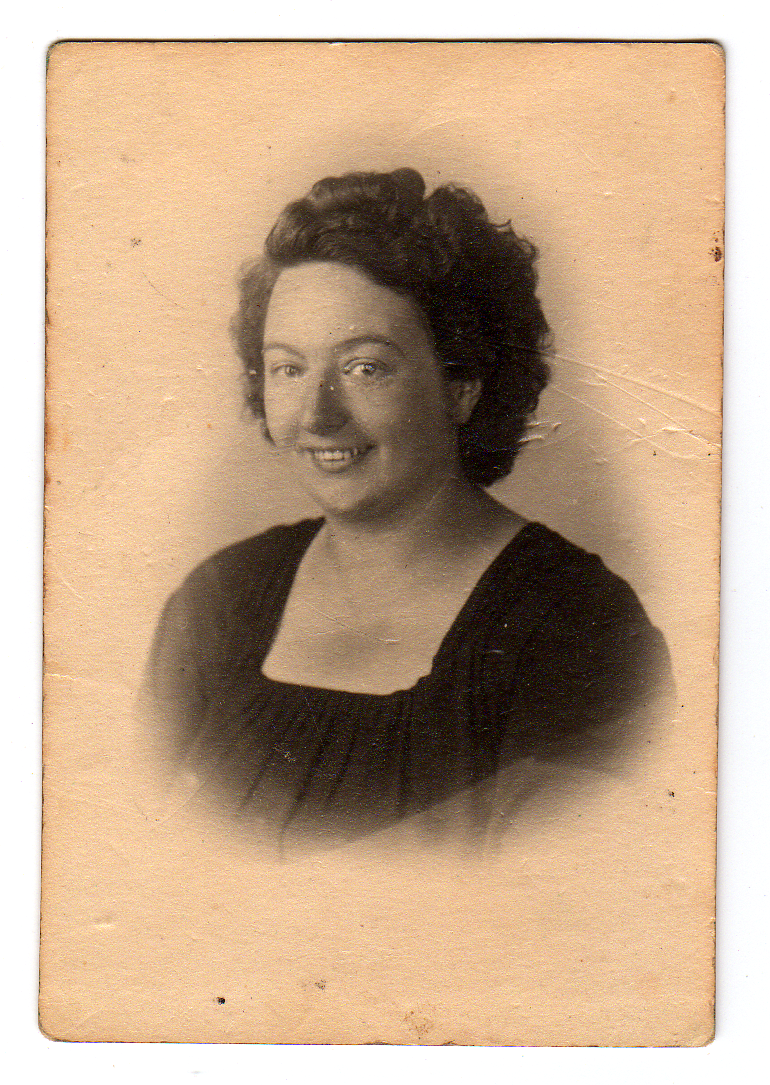
- Born: 10 February 1917; Venice, Kingdom of Italy
- Died: 9 August 1976 (aged 59); Venice, Italy
- Education: Ca' Foscari University of Venice
- Occupations: Educator, politician and partisan
- Organization(s): Italian Catholic University Federation; Missionaries of Charity
- Political party: Christian Democracy (Italy)

Ida d'Este (10 February 1917 – 9 August 1976) was an Italian educator, politician and partisan, who was a part of the anti-fascist resistance movement in Italy during World War II. She survived the war, and in 1953 was elected to the Chamber of Deputies of the Italian Parliament as a member of the Catholic-inspired and centrist Christian Democracy political party.

== Biography ==
D'Este was born on 10 February 1917 in Venice, Kingdom of Italy. She came from a cultured and wealthy family who were politically liberal. She attended school with the Sisters of Nevers, then studied Modern Languages and Literature at the Ca' Foscari University of Venice, where she linked with the Italian Catholic University Federation (FUCI). She wrote her thesis on the philosopher Blaise Pascal and graduated in 1941. In 1942, she completed a high school diploma in classical studies then became a French secondary school teacher.

During World War II, d'Este became a partisan as a part of the anti-fascist resistance movement in Italy, organised relief for Italian soldiers held captive on ships docked in Venice and disseminated anti-fascist literature. d'Este also founded the Centro Italiano Femminile (CIF) [it] with other activists including Laura Branchini and Betty Ambiveri in 1944.

On 7 January 1945, d'Este was arrested in Padua alongside Giovanni Ponti and Egidio Meneghetti. She was tortured and interrogated until 24 February 1945, then was deported to Bolzano Transit Camp where she was given the number 10,114. She was forced to work in a ball-bearing factory and as a cleaner for the camp staff. She survived until the end of the war, but contacted a lung infection which meant the she was confined to a sanatorium in Crespano after liberation to recover.

On 5 February 1953, d'Este was elected to the Chamber of Deputies of the Italian Parliament in the first and second legislative sessions of the Republic as a member of the Catholic-inspired and centrist Christian Democracy political party. She was a member of the education and fine arts parliamentary commission. She served until 4 June 1953, then retired from politics to focus on charitable work.

D'Este was a supporter of the abolitionist Legge Merlin (1958), which banned brothels and established a new criminal offence called "exploitation of prostitution." In 1963, d'Este founded the lay institute "Missionaries of Charity," which aimed to protect single mothers and sex workers.

d'Este died on 9 August 1976 in Venice, aged 59.
