= Italian Catholic Federation of University Students =

Federation of Italian Catholic university students

The Italian Catholic Federation of University Students (Italian: Federazione Universitaria Cattolica Italiana, FUCI) is a federation of groups representing Roman Catholic university students in Italy.

== History ==
On December 8, 1889, it was founded in Rome the Saint Sebastian Circle which published the La Vita Nova, a university cultural journal edited by Romolo Murri. The circle tested a primitive form of coordination between some independent Catholic student groups who were active in the Italian universities. A column stated the program of the future FUCI, claiming the willingness to rebuild sciences and social life, to reconstruct the human community, but under the laws of the inspiring faith and under the bonds of the industrious Christian charity.

The FUCI was founded during the 14th Italian Roman Catholics national congress which the Opera dei Congressi organized from the 1st to the 4th September 1896 in Fiesole. Since its beginning the FUCI was involved in Italian political life and particularly engaged in the abolition of the Non Expedit ban of Roman Catholics, which had come into force since the Constitution of the Kingdom of Italy in 1861.

In 1921 the FUCI promoted the institution of the MIEC PAX Romana, which was one of the first supranational experiences of the Roman Catholic laity. In 1925 the future Pope Paul VI succeeded Gian Domenico Pini as spiritual director, while the barrister Igino RIghetti was elected president of the association. Montini remained in charge from 1925 up to 1933.

After the Matteotti homicide in June 1924, the National Fascist Party founded its student and youth organization under the name of Fascist Universitarian Groups. At the same time, all the existing universitarian student organizations were suppressed by law, providing a unique exception for the FUCI.

At the end of the Second World War, 35 FUCI members were elected within the 1946 Constituent Assembly of Italy. During the 1960s some of the FUCI exponents and alumni were actively involved in the Second Vatican Council whose pastoral suggestions were widely adopted across the following decades.

== Notable members ==
- Aldo Moro : politician and head of Italian government. Was president of FUCI from 1939 to 1942.
- Giulio Andreotti : politician and head of Italian government. Was president of FUCI from 1942 to 1944. Andreotti met for the first time Alcide De Gasperi when he was employed at the Vatican Library during the Second World War. Both of them married the FUCI's positions.
- Francesco Cossiga : politician and president of Italy
- Ida d'Este : educator, politician and partisan; part of the anti-fascist resistance movement in Italy during World War II
- Giovanni Battista Montini : the future Pope Paul VI was the FUCI national spiritual assistant from 1925 to 1933.
- Blessed Itala Mela : Benedictine oblate, mystic and theologian.
- Saint Pier Giorgio Frassati : Italian Youth, 1901–1925, member of Cesare Balbo Circle (FUCI Member) at Polytechnic of Turin
- Venerable Giorgio La Pira : engaged in the FUCI's branch located in Messina (to practice with playing cards and to play chess) and then at the Catholic University in Rome (1940-1945).

== See also ==
- Australian Catholic Students Association
- National Catholic Student Coalition
- Katholieke Studentenvereniging Sanctus Virgilius Delft
- Katholiek Vlaams Hoogstudentenverbond
