= 1913 Italian general election =

- 26 October 1913 (first round); 2 November 1913 (second round)

All 508 seats in the Chamber of Deputies 255 seats needed for a majority
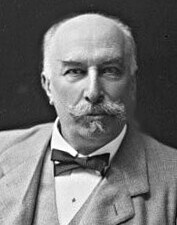

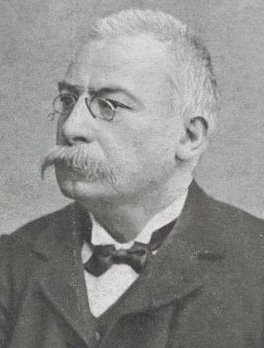

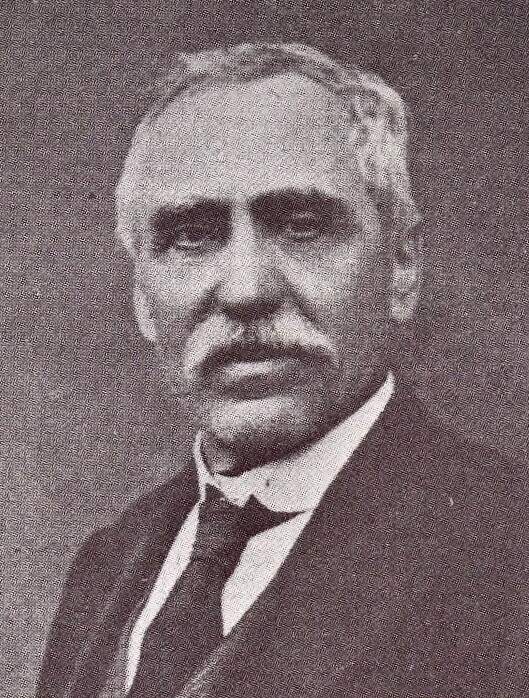

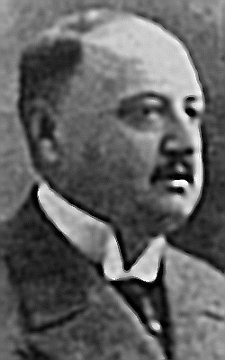

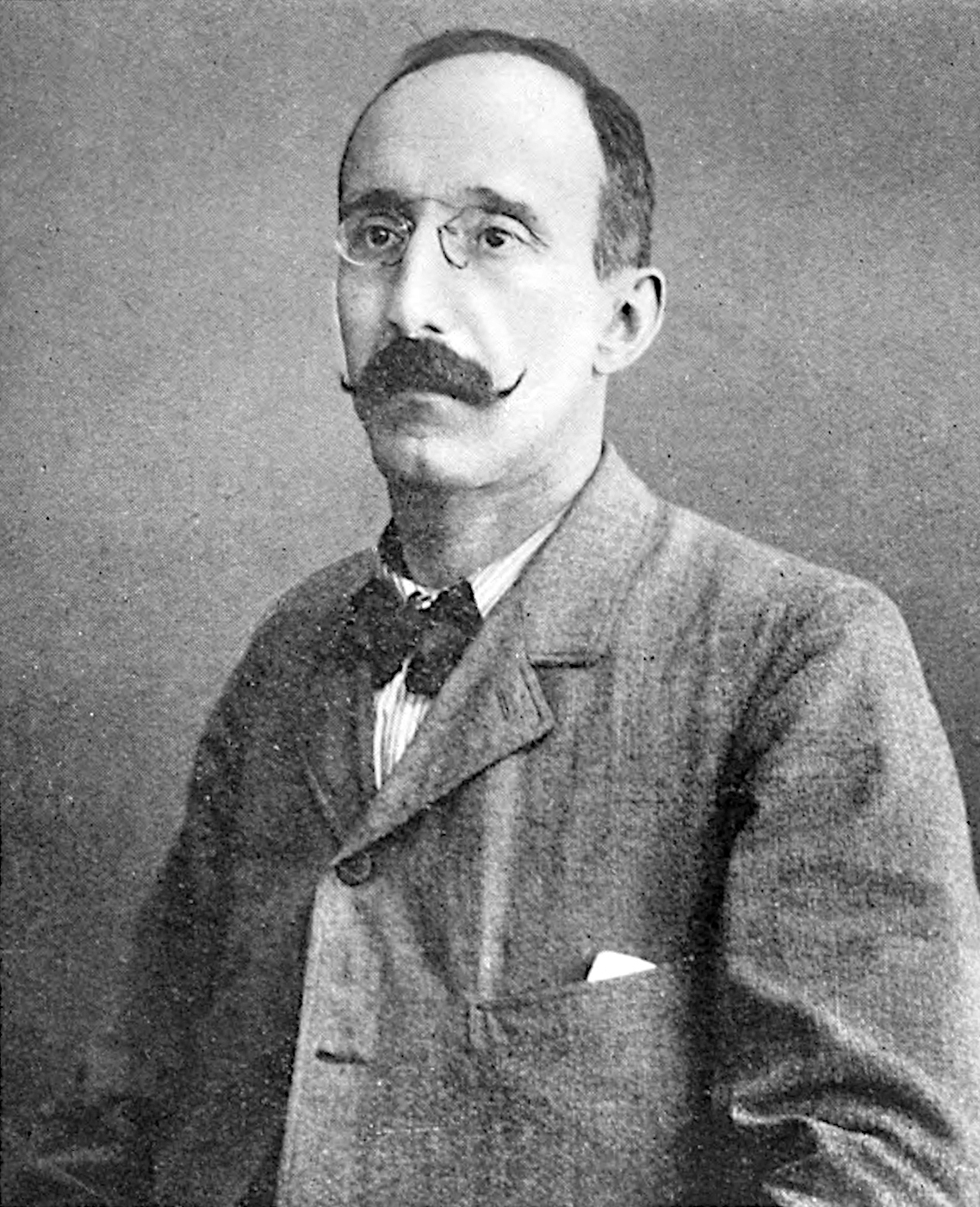
	Majority party	Minority party	Third party
Leader	Giovanni Giolitti	Ettore Sacchi	Costantino Lazzari
Party	Liberal	Radical	Socialist
Seats won	270	62	52
Seat change	▼59	▲14	▲11
Popular vote	2,387,947	522,522	883,409
Percentage	47.62%	10.42%	17.62%
Swing	▼6.83 pp	▲0.50 pp	▼1.40 pp
	Fourth party	Fifth party	Sixth party
Leader	Giovanni Antonio Vanni	Ottorino Gentiloni	Leonida Bissolati
Party	PDCI	UECI	PSRI
Seats won	29	20	19
Seat change	New	▲4	New
Popular vote	277,251	212,319	196,406
Percentage	5.53%	4.23%	3.92%
Swing	New	▲0.24 pp	New
Prime Minister before election
Giovanni Giolitti
Liberal
Elected Prime Minister
Giovanni Giolitti
Liberal

General elections were held in Italy on 26 October 1913, with a second round of voting on 2 November. The Liberals (the former Ministeriali) narrowly retained an absolute majority in the Chamber of Deputies, while the Radical Party emerged as the largest opposition bloc. Both groupings did particularly well in Southern Italy, while the Italian Socialist Party gained eight seats and was the largest party in Emilia-Romagna. However, the election marked the beginning of the decline of Liberal establishment.

There were episodes of violence during the election.

== Background ==
The two historical parliamentary factions, the liberal and progressive Left and the conservative and monarchist Right, formed a single liberal and centrist group, known as Liberals, under the leadership of Giovanni Giolitti. This phenomenon, known in Italian as Trasformismo (roughly translatable in English as "transformism"—in a satirical newspaper, the PM was depicted as a chameleon), effectively removed political differences in Parliament, which was dominated by an undistinguished liberal bloc with a landslide majority until after World War I. Two parliamentary factions alternated in government, one led by Sidney Sonnino and the other, by far the larger of the two, by Giolitti. At that time the Liberals governed in alliance with the Radicals, the Democrats and, eventually, the Reform Socialists. This alliance governed against two smaller opposition: The Clericals, composed by some Vatican-oriented politicians, The Extreme, formed by the socialist faction which represented a real left in a present-day concept.

== Electoral reform ==
Changes made in 1912 widened the voting franchise to include literate men aged 21, men who had served in the army or navy (regardless of whether they were 21 years old), and illiterate men over the age of 30. This raised the number of eligible voters from 2,930,473 in 1909 to 8,443,205. The electoral system remained single-member constituencies with two-round majority voting.

== Parties and leaders ==
Party	Ideology	Leader	Seats in 1909
Liberals	Liberalism	Giovanni Giolitti	372
Italian Radical Party (PR)	Radicalism	Ettore Sacchi	45
Italian Socialist Party (PSI)	Socialism	Costantino Lazzari	41
Italian Republican Party (PRI)	Republicanism	Napoleone Colajanni	41
Italian Catholic Electoral Union (UECI)	Christian democracy	Ottorino Gentiloni	16
Italian Constitutional Democratic Party (PDCI)	Social liberalism	Giovanni Antonio Vanni	Did not exist
Italian Reformist Socialist Party (PSRI)	Social democracy	Leonida Bissolati	Did not exist
Democratic Party (PD)	Social liberalism	several	Did not exist
Conservative Catholics (CC)	Conservatism	several	Did not exist

== Results ==
Party	Votes	%	Seats	+/–
Liberals	2,387,947	47.62	270	New
Italian Socialist Party	883,409	17.62	52	+11
Italian Radical Party	522,522	10.42	62	+14
Italian Constitutional Democratic Party	277,251	5.53	29	New
Italian Catholic Electoral Union	212,319	4.23	20	+4
Italian Reformist Socialist Party	196,406	3.92	19	New
Democratic Party	138,967	2.77	11	New
Italian Republican Party	102,102	2.04	8	−15
Conservative Catholics	89,630	1.79	9	New
Dissident Republicans	71,564	1.43	9	New
Independent Socialists	67,133	1.34	8	New
Dissident Radicals	65,671	1.31	11	New
Total	5,014,921	100.00	508	0
Valid votes	5,014,921	98.32		
Invalid/blank votes	85,694	1.68		
Total votes	5,100,615	100.00		
Registered voters/turnout	8,443,205	60.41		
Source: National Institute of Statistics

Popular vote
Liberals	47.62%
PSI	17.62%
PR	10.42%
PDC	5.53%
UECI	4.23%
PSRI	3.92%
PD	2.77%
PRI	2.04%
CC	1.79%
DRep	1.43%
SI	1.34%
DRad	1.31%

=== Leading party by region ===
Region	First party	Second party	Third party
Abruzzo-Molise	Liberals	PSI	PR
Apulia	Liberals	PSI	PR
Basilicata	Liberals	PR	PSI
Calabria	Liberals	PR	PSI
Campania	Liberals	PR	PSI
Emilia-Romagna	PSI	Liberals	PR
Lazio	Liberals	PSI	PR
Liguria	Liberals	PSI	PR
Lombardy	PSI	Liberals	PR
Marche	Liberals	PSI	PR
Piedmont	Liberals	PSI	PR
Sardinia	Liberals	PSI	PR
Sicily	Liberals	PR	PSI
Tuscany	PSI	Liberals	PR
Umbria	PSI	Liberals	PR
Veneto	Liberals	PSI	PR
