= Stefano Cavazzoni =

Italian politician (1881–1951)

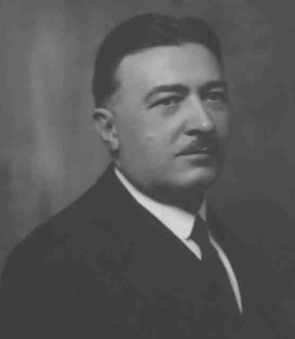

Minister of Labour
- In office 31 October 1922 – 27 April 1923
- Prime Minister: Benito Mussolini

Personal details
- Born: 1 August 1881 Guastalla, Kingdom of Italy
- Died: 31 May 1951 (aged 69) Milan, Italy
- Party: Conservative Catholics; Italian People's Party; National Fascist Party

Stefano Cavazzoni (1881–1951) was an Italian politician who served as the minister of labour between October 1922 and April 1923. He was also a member of the parliament and senate.

== Biography ==
Cavazzoni was born in Guastalla, Reggio Emilia, on 1 August 1881. He was a member of the Italian People's Party being one of its right-wing group leaders. Following the general elections in November 1919 and also, in 1921 he was elected to the parliament. He was named as minister of labour on 31 October 1922 in the first cabinet of Benito Mussolini and remained in office until 27 April 1923.

He left the Italian People's Party and established a group entitled the National Center together with Paolo Mattei Gentili, Aristede Carapelle, and Giovanni Grosoli in 1924. It was a Catholic group and was close to fascism. In 1924 Cavazzoni was again elected as a deputy. On 21 January 1929 he was appointed senator. In May 1930 he became the president of the Istituto Centrale di Credito. The same year the National Center ended its activities.

From 1933 to 1943 Cavazzoni was the representative of the government on the board of directors of the Università Cattolica del Sacro Cuore in Milan. In 1940 he became a member of the National Fascist Party. Following the fall of fascism he was tried in the High Court of Justice at the Senate and was found guilty for his political activities in October 1945.

Cavazzoni died in Milan on 31 May 1951 as a result of angina which he had experienced since 1939.

=== Views ===
Cavazzoni was a devout Catholic. He was among the clerico-fascists in the period of Fascist rule in Italy. While serving as a senator he argued that the Fascist labour legislation should be consistent with Catholic social principles. During the Fascist rule he believed that collaboration with Fascists was the principal way of achieving the best national and religious outcomes.
