= Italian Catholic Electoral Union =

Italian Catholic Electoral Union Unione Elettorale Cattolica Italiana
- Abbreviation: UECI
- Leader: Ottorino Gentiloni
- Founded: 1906
- Dissolved: 1919
- Preceded by: Opera dei Congressi
- Merged into: Italian People's Party
- Ideology: Christian democracy
- Political position: Centre
- Religion: Catholicism

The Italian Catholic Electoral Union (Unione Elettorale Cattolica Italiana, UECI) was a political organization designed to coordinate the participation of Catholic voices in Italian electoral contests. Its founder and leader was the Count Vincenzo Ottorino Gentiloni.

== History ==
The Catholic Electoral Union was formed in 1906 after the suppression of the Opera dei Congressi ("Work of the Congress") following the encyclical Il fermo proposito of Pope Pius X. It was headed 1909-16 by Count Ottorino Gentiloni. The Gentiloni pact of 1913 brought many new Catholic voters into politics, where they supported the Liberal Union of Prime Minister Giovanni Giolitti. By the terms of the pact, the Union directed Catholic voters to Giolitti supporters who agreed to favor the Church's position on such key issues as funding private Catholic schools, and blocking a law allowing divorce.

The Gentiloni Pact was born out of a secret deal in the run-up to the 1913 general election between Catholic voters and Giolitti's Liberal candidates who promised to support Catholic policies, especially funding of Catholic private schools, and opposition to a law permitting divorce. It was estimated that over 200 deputies were elected through the Pact, enough to provide a majority for Giolitti.

The Italian Socialist Party gained votes (from 19% to 23% of the voters) while the liberals were strengthened in the short run. In the past, Giolitti had co-opted many moderate Socialists (as well as members of other fringe parties). Giolitti himself was against political parties, which he felt were divisive and harmful to the "gentleman's game" of politics.

The Gentiloni Pact was condemned by Socialists and anti-Clerical allies of Giolitti. They saw the Church as the bulwark to progress and felt betrayed into an alliance with Giolitti in the past. The Socialists would never trust Giolitti or the liberal system again.

This led the revolutionary faction of the Italian Socialist Party to gain strength in Italy although the Vatican became increasingly influential in Italian politics as well.

Eventually, Giolitti was forced to resign by his anti-clerical allies in March 1914, and was replaced as prime minister by Antonio Salandra on appointment of the King.

== Electoral results ==
Election	Leader	Chamber of Deputies				
Election	Leader	Votes	%	Seats	+/–	Position
1904	Ottorino Gentiloni	8,008	0.5	3 / 508	▲3	▲6th
1909	Ottorino Gentiloni	73,015	4.0	18 / 508	▲15	6th
1913	Ottorino Gentiloni	212,319	4.2	20 / 508	▲2	▲5th
