= Italian Constitutional Democratic Party =

Defunct political party in the Kingdom of Italy

Italian Constitutional Democratic Party Partito Costituzionale Democratico Italiano
- Leader: Giovanni Antonio Vanni
- Founded: 1913
- Dissolved: 1919
- Split from: Liberals
- Merged into: Social Democracy
- Ideology: Social liberalism
- Political position: Centre-left

The Italian Constitutional Democratic Party (Italian: Partito Democratico Costituzionale Italiano, PDCI) was a social-liberal political party in Italy.

The party emerged in 1913 from the left wing, which is close to the ideas of the late Prime Minister Giuseppe Zanardelli, of the dominant Liberals, of which it continued to be a government coalition partner. In the 1913 general election the party, which was rooted in Southern Italy while in the North it often presented joint candidates with the Liberals, won 4.8% of the vote and 40 seats in the Chamber of Deputies. In 1919 the PDCI was merged with other liberal parties and groupings in the Social Democracy, that gained 10.9% and 60 seats in the 1919 general election, while other Democrats joined Liberal–Radical joint lists.

== Electoral results ==
Chamber of Deputies
Election	Votes	%	Seats	+/–	Leader	Government
1913	277,251 (#4)	5.5	29 / 508	–	several	Opposition

== See also ==
- Liberalism and radicalism in Italy
