= Collegium Studiosorum Veritas =

Dutch student fraternity

- Founded: 30 May 1889; 136 years ago Utrecht, Netherlands
- Type: Literary
- Affiliation: Het Aller Heiligen Convent
- Former affiliation: Union of Catholic Student Associations
- Status: Active
- Emphasis: Catholicism
- Scope: Local
- Motto: Deus Scientiarum Dominus
- Chapters: 1
- Members: 1,850 lifetime
- Headquarters: Crooked New Canal 54; Utrecht 3512; The Netherlands
- Website: www.veritas.nl/home

The Collegium Studiosorum Veritas (CS Veritas) is a student fraternity in the city of Utrecht, the Netherlands. Founded in 1889, this is the second oldest in the city.

== History ==
Collegium Studiosorum Veritas was established by thirty students on 30 May 1889, as a Catholic literary society. Jan Willem MarieBosch van Oud-Amelisweerd chaired the reading society. Its goal was to provide a general Catholic education.

The society was originally called Deus Scientiarum Dominus (DSD or God, Lord of the Sciences) but changed its name to Katholieke Studentenvereeniging der Rijksuniversiteit te Utrecht on 13 October 1890. Its name changed to Katholieke Studentenvereniging Veritas on 20 February 1891. Originally an all-male organization, women were allowed to join in 1906. It became a member of the Union of Catholic Student Associations in October 1908.

The society went dormant on 14 July 1941, during World War II when its building and resources were confiscated. After the war, it resumed operations as Collegium Studiosorum Veritas.

Starting on 6 November 1969, non-students were allowed to join, resulting in an exodus of members that almost led to bankruptcy. The association survived and was reorganized in the mid-1970s, leading to the establishment of two chartible foundations.

Collegium Studiosorum Veritas returned to being a student-only organization. As of 2024, it has 1,850 members. It is a member of the Het Aller Heiligen Convent and was a former member of the Union of Catholic Student Associations.

== Symbol ==
The fraternity's motto is Deus Scientiarum Dominus.

== Governance ==
Collegium Studiosorum Veritas consists of five legal entities:

- Collegium Studiosorum Veritas (CSV) – the student organization
- Stichting Veritas Beheer (SVB) – a charitable foundation
- Stichting Studiefonds Veritas (SSV) – a charitable foundation
- Stichting Veritas Eigen Huis (SVEH) – s charitable foundation
- Reünisten Vereniging Veritas (RVV) – an alumni association

== See also ==
- Katholieke Studentenvereniging Sanctus Virgilius Delft
