= Democratic Party (Italy, 1913) =

Democratic Party Partito Democratico
- Founded: 1913
- Dissolved: 1919
- Split from: Liberals
- Merged into: Social Democracy
- Ideology: Social liberalism
- Political position: Centre-left

The Democratic Party (Partito Democratico, PD) was a social liberal political party in Italy.

It emerged in 1913 from the left wing of the dominant Liberals, of which it continued to be a government coalition partner until 1919. In the 1913 general election the party won 2.8% of the vote and 11 seats in the Chamber of Deputies. In 1919 the PD was merged with other liberal parties and groupings in the Social Democracy party, that gained 10.9% and 60 seats in the 1919 general election, while other Democrats joined Liberal–Radical joint lists.

== Electoral results ==
Chamber of Deputies
Election year	# of overall votes	% of overall vote	# of overall seats won	+/–	Leader
1913	138,967 (#7)	2.8	11 / 508	–	several
