= Egidio Meneghetti =

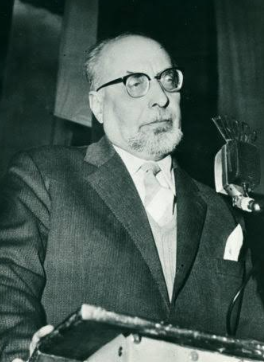
Egidio Meneghetti

Egidio Meneghetti (14 November 1892 – 4 March 1961) was an Italian pharmacologist, professor at the University of Padua, and a part of the anti-fascist resistance movement. He contributed to studies on the injection of colloidal substances into the bloodstream for chemotherapy. He demonstrated that colloidal metal ions such as an antimony compound injected slowly into the blood stream could reach the bone marrow and affect red blood cell production.

== Biography ==
Meneghetti was born in Verona to physician Umberto and Clorinda Stegagno. Growing up with socialist ideals he supported the party of Filippo Turati and Leonida Bissolati even while in high school at Verona. He joined the University of Padua but his medical studies was interrupted by the war during which he enlisted but completed his studies before going in 1916 to serve in field hospitals on the frontline. He returned to become an assistant to Luigi Sabbatini at the University of Padua in 1919. He went to the University of Göttingen in 1922, and visited the Pasteur Institute. He then took up teaching pharmacology and hygiene at the University of Camerino. He joined Italia libera, an anti-fascist group which was broken up in 1925 and he then served in secret. He was however identified and listed as an anti-fascist following the attempt to assassinate Mussolini in Bologna on 31 October 1926 and was forced to leave the University of Padua for Camerino. In 1932 he returned to the University of Padua. On November 16, 1943 his wife Maria and their daughter Lina were killed by the first bombing raids over Padua. He then completely immersed himself in the resistance movement. He was captured on 7 January 1945 and was ordered to be sent to a concentration camp in Germany. This did not happen due to railway line problems and he was held in Bolzano until he was liberated. He returned to university and was posted rector. He was a member of the Italian Socialist Party and supported the European Federalist Movement with Altiero Spinelli and Ernesto Rossi. An autobiographical book on his life was titled Biologia rivoluzionaria (1962). Meneghetti also wrote some poetry including a collection, Cante in piassa, in Veronese dialect. A street in Verona is named in his honour and a bust stands at the entrance of the hall at Palazzo del Bo in the University of Padua.

Meneghetti's principal contribution to medicine was his experimental studies on the delivery of metal ions into the bloodstream. He demonstrated that fine colloidal particles such as of metal ions could be injected slowly into the bloodstream to reach specific targets, thus contributing to chemotherapy. His student Renato Santi also worked on the topic, examining alkaloids from plants and their delivery.
