= Katholieke Studentenvereniging Sanctus Virgilius =

Dutch Catholic organization

- Founded: March 2, 1898; 128 years ago Polytechnic School of Delft
- Type: Social
- Affiliation: Aller Heiligen Convent
- Status: Active
- Scope: Local
- Motto: Crescendo Gramen Sementat "As the seed grows, so it bears fruit"
- Colors: Delft Blauw (blue) and Porcelain white
- Patron saint: Virgil of Salzburg
- Members: 2,070 active 15,069 lifetime
- Nickname: Virgiel
- Former name: Crescendo Gramen Sementat
- Headquarters: Old Delft 57; Delft, South Holland 2611 BC; The Netherlands
- Website: www.virgiel.nl/home

Katholieke Studentenvereniging Sanctus Virgilius or KSV Sanctus Virgilius (Dutch: Katholieke Studenten Vereniging, English: Catholic Student Society), also known as Virgiel, is a Dutch coeducational fraternity. It was established at the Polytechnic School of Delft in Delft in 1898. It has more than 2,000 student members at 176 houses.

== History ==
Virgiel was founded as Crescendo Gramen Sementat on March 2, 1898, at the Polytechnic School of Delft, now Delft University of Technology, as the result of emancipation of the Catholic youth in the Netherlands. Catholicism had long been repressed by government policy, and Delft Catholic students wanted to unite to discuss their faith and position in society. At the time, most members also belonged to the Delftsch Studenten Corps, the oldest student fraternity in Delft.

The fraternity changed its name to Sanctus Virgilius in 1903. It was reorganized in 1931 as a student society and was no longer considered a religious society. Virgiel is now a non-faith-based fraternity/sorority that is social in purpose but also expands knowledge and views outside of academic classes.

In 2025, Virgiel had 2,070 male and female student members, 12,999 alumni members, and 176 houses. Around thirty percent of its members are women. Members are students at Delft University of Technology, Inholland University of Applied Sciences Delft, or The Hague University of Applied Sciences Delft. The fraternity is a member of Aller Heiligen Convent.

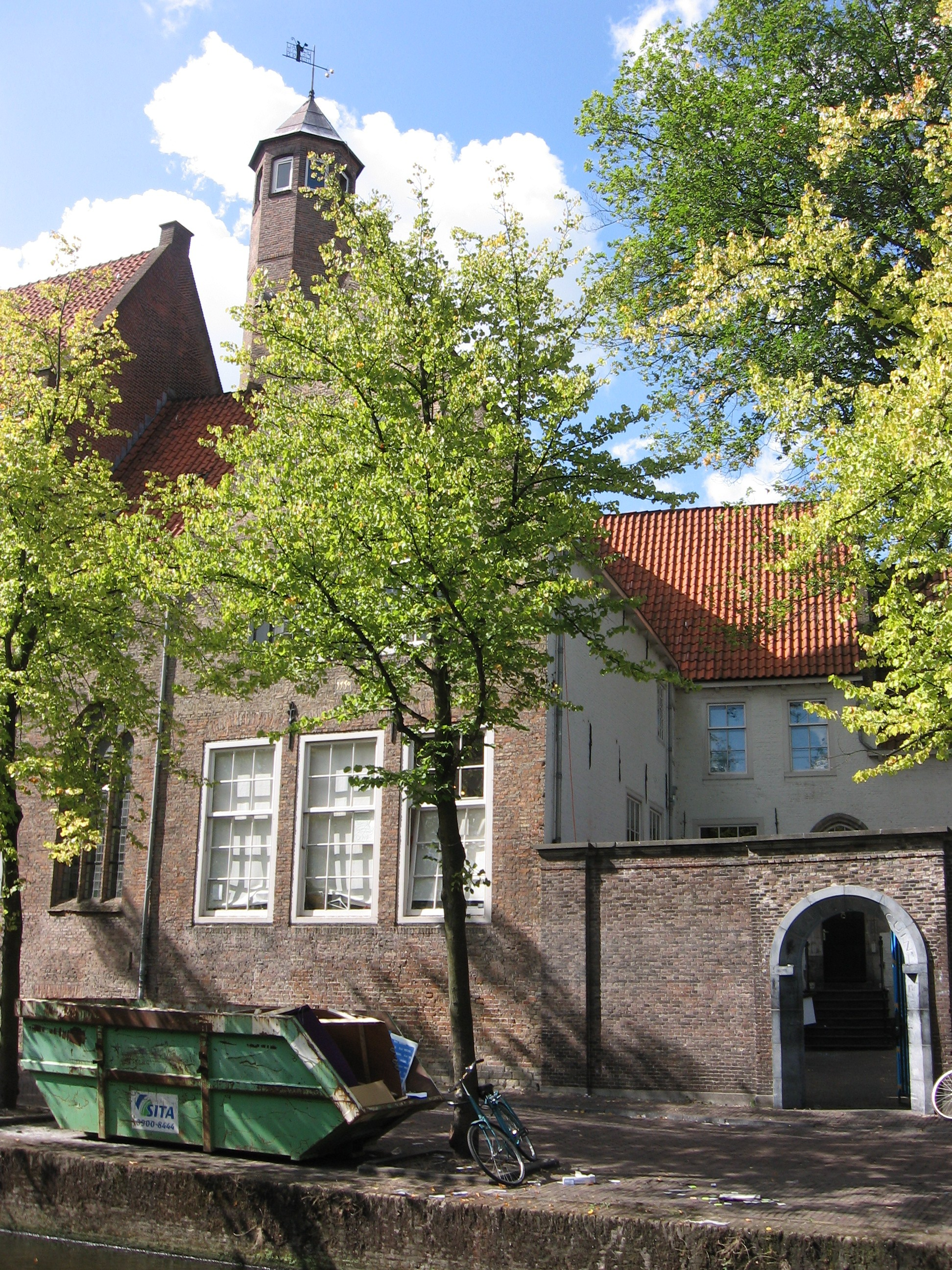
St. Barbara's Monastery, home of Virgiel

== Symbols ==
Sanctus Virgillus was named after the Irish-born astronomer, geometer, and bishop Saint Virgil. Its nickname is Virgiel. The fraternity's motto is Crescendo Gramen Sementat or "As the seed grows, so it bears fruit".

== Buildings ==
Virgiel has 176 residential houses, organized as residents for all-males, all-females, or mixed. Some houses are exclusively for members; others include members of other student associations.

The fraternity's primary hall is an old monastery located in the city center of Delft. The monastery was built for nuns in 1405 and was later used as an orphanage. The fraternity first rented the monastery in 1949 from Gemeente Delft. After the fraternity restored the monastery, Gemeente Delft sold it to Virgiel in 1989 for one guilder.

== Activities ==
Member each dinner with their house or club once or twice a week. Virgiel's members participate in a wide variety of cultural events and sports, including lectures, workshops, debates, travel, football, field hockey, rugby, and climbing.

In 1963, Virgiel donated a bronze bust of poet and critic Dirk Coster, made by the sculptor Henk Entienne, to the garden at Meisjeshuis in Delft.

== Notable members ==
- Jo Ritzen, Minister of Education, Culture and Science; Minister of Welfare, Health and Culture; Minister of Education and Sciences

== See also ==
- Collegium Studiosorum Veritas
