= 1909 Italian general election =

- 7 March 1909 (first round); 14 March 1909 (second round)

All 508 seats in the Chamber of Deputies 255 seats needed for a majority
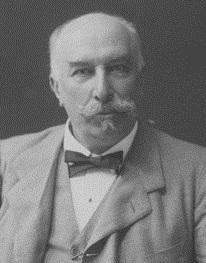

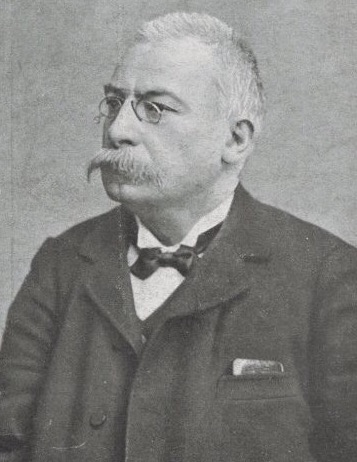

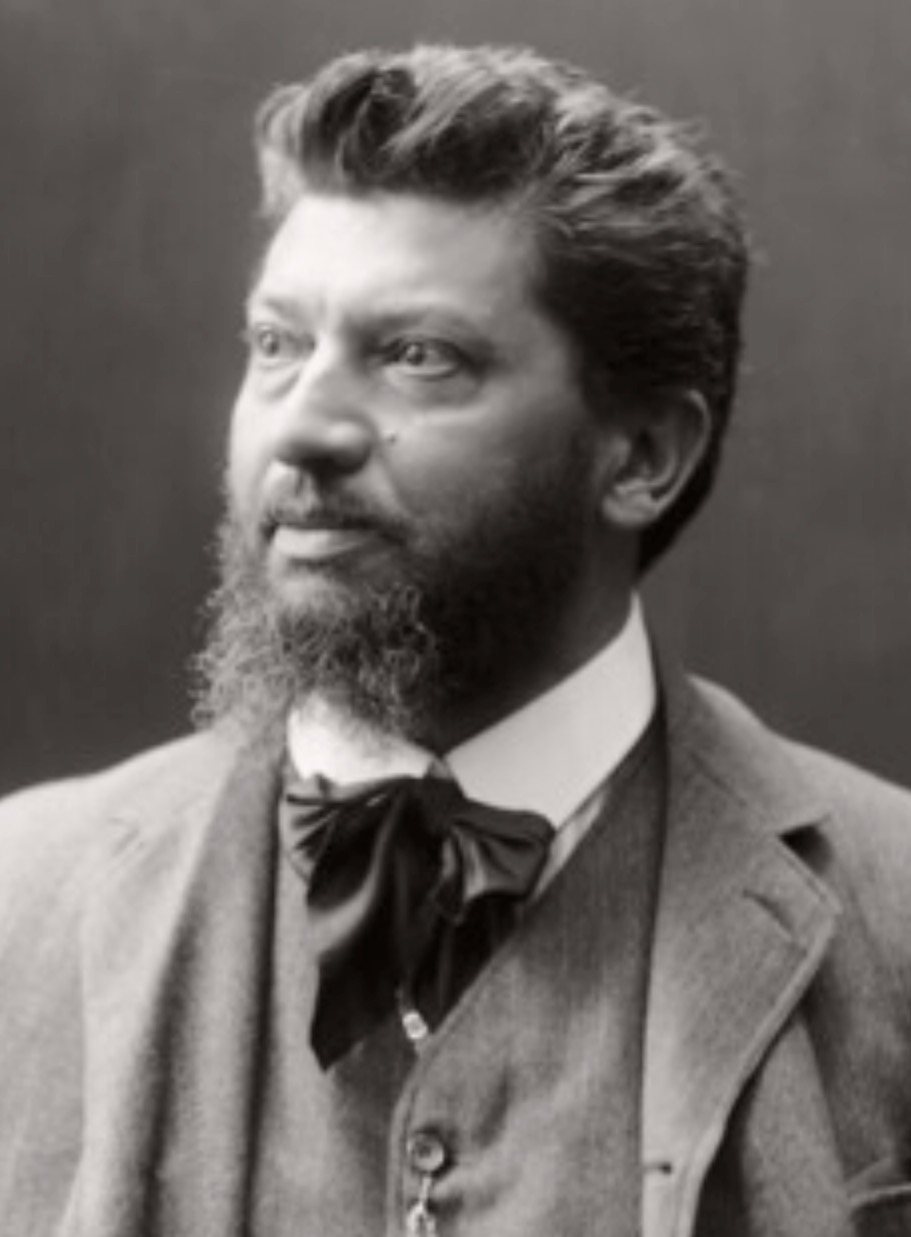

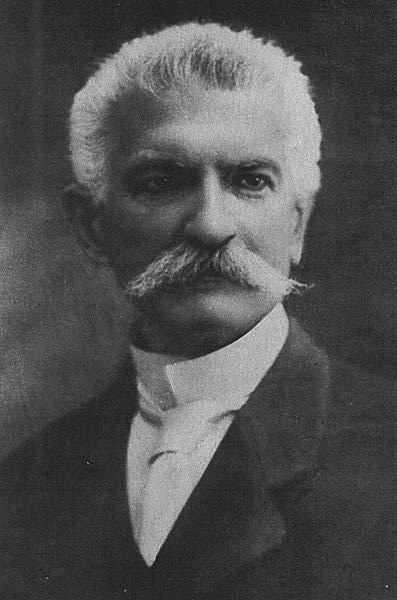

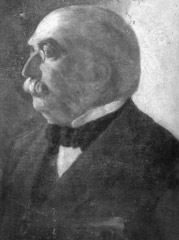

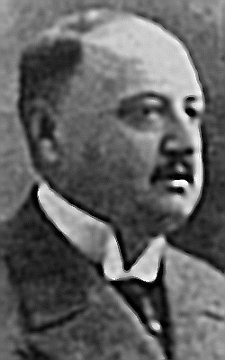
	Majority party	Minority party	Third party
Leader	Giovanni Giolitti	Ettore Sacchi	Filippo Turati
Party	Historical Left	Radical Party	PSI
Seats won	336	45	41
Seat change	▼3	▲8	▲12
Popular vote	995,290	181,242	347,615
Percentage	54.45%	9.92%	19.02%
Swing	▲3.55 pp	▲1.54 pp	▼2.33 pp
	Fourth party	Fifth party	Sixth party
Leader	Sydney Sonnino	Napoleone Colajanni	Ottorino Gentiloni
Party	Historical Right	PRI	UECI
Seats won	36	24	16
Seat change	▼40	0	▲13
Popular vote	108,029	81,461	73,015
Percentage	5.91%	4.46%	3.99%
Swing	▼8.01 pp	▼0.47 pp	▲3.47 pp
Prime Minister before election
Giovanni Giolitti
Historical Left
Elected Prime Minister
Giovanni Giolitti
Historical Left

General elections were held in Italy on 7 March 1909, with a second round of voting on 14 March. The "ministerial" left-wing bloc remained the largest in Parliament, winning 329 of the 508 seats.

== Background ==
The right-wing leader Sidney Sonnino succeed to Giolitti's protégé Alessandro Fortis as prime minister in 1906. But his cabinet had a short lift; any way Sonnino formed an alliance with France on the colonial expansion in North Africa. His government lasted only few months.

After Sonnino's resignation Giovanni Giolitti returned to power in 1906. Many critics accused Giolitti of manipulating the elections, piling up majorities with the restricted suffrage at the time, using the prefects just as his contenders. However, he did refine the practice in the elections of 1904 and 1909 that gave the liberals secure majorities.

In the election, The Right lost his important position in the Parliament, replaced by the Radical Party of Ettore Sacchi, who became an ally of Giolitti and the Italian Socialist Party of Filippo Turati, which continued its strong opposition to the Left governments.

== Electoral system ==
The election was held using 508 single-member constituencies. However, prior to the election the electoral law was amended so that candidates needed only an absolute majority of votes to win their constituency, abolishing the second requirement of receiving the votes of at least one-sixth of registered voters.

== Parties and leaders ==
Party	Ideology	Leader	Seats in 1904
Historical Left	Liberalism	Giovanni Giolitti	339
Historical Right	Conservatism	Sydney Sonnino	76
Italian Radical Party	Radicalism	Ettore Sacchi	37
Italian Socialist Party	Socialism	Filippo Turati	29
Italian Republican Party	Republicanism	Napoleone Colajanni	24
Italian Catholic Electoral Union	Christian democracy	Ottorino Gentiloni	3

== Results ==
Party	Votes	%	Seats	+/–
Historical Left	995,290	54.45	336	−3
Italian Socialist Party	347,615	19.02	41	+12
Italian Radical Party	181,242	9.92	45	+8
Historical Right	108,029	5.91	36	−40
Italian Republican Party	81,461	4.46	24	0
Italian Catholic Electoral Union	73,015	3.99	16	+13
Constitutional Independents	41,213	2.25	10	New
Total	1,827,865	100.00	508	0
Valid votes	1,827,865	96.74		
Invalid/blank votes	61,500	3.26		
Total votes	1,889,365	100.00		
Registered voters/turnout	2,930,473	64.47		
Source: National Institute of Statistics

=== Leading party by region ===
Region	First party	Second party	Third party
Abruzzo-Molise	Left	PSI	PR
Apulia	Left	PSI	PR
Basilicata	Left	PSI	PR
Calabria	Left	PR	PSI
Campania	Left	PR	PSI
Emilia-Romagna	PSI	Left	PR
Lazio	Min.	PSI	PR
Liguria	Left	PSI	PR
Lombardy	Left	PSI	PR
Marche	Left	PSI	PR
Piedmont	Left	PSI	PR
Sardinia	Left	PSI	PR
Sicily	Left	PR	PSI
Tuscany	PSI	Left	PR
Umbria	PSI	Left	PR
Veneto	Left	PSI	PR
