= Gentiloni Pact =

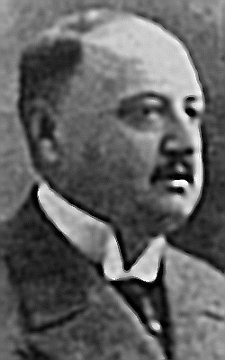
Vincenzo Ottorino Gentiloni

The Gentiloni Pact (Italian: Patto Gentiloni) was the 1913 agreement between Italian Prime Minister Giovanni Giolitti and Count Ottorino Gentiloni, president of the Catholic Electoral Union from 1909 to 1916, to swing Catholic voters behind Giolitti's coalition in the 1913 general election.

== Background ==
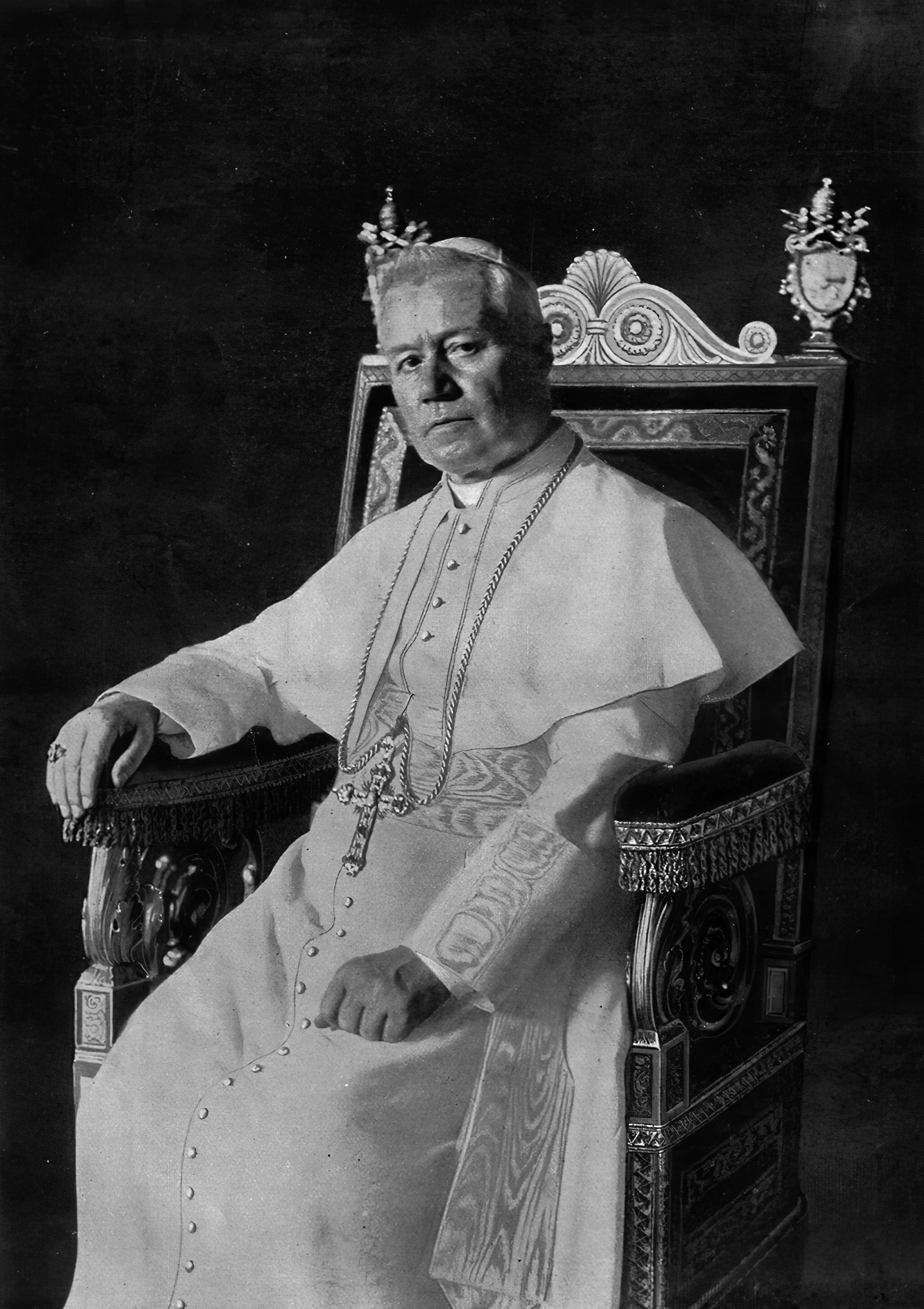
Portrait of Pope Pius X

Due to the evolving relationship between the Catholics and the Italian liberal state, in the 1910s Giolitti saw a way to further his clout and sway over the masses after the extension of suffrage to all adult males.

In 1904, Pope Pius X informally gave permission to Catholics to vote for government candidates in areas where the Italian Socialist Party might win. Since the Socialists were the arch-enemy of the Church, the reductionist logic of the Church led it to promote any anti-Socialist measures. Voting for the Socialists was grounds for excommunication from the Church.

The Vatican had two major goals at this point: to stem the rise of Socialism and to monitor the grassroots Catholic organizations (co-ops, peasant leagues, credit unions, etc.). Since the masses tended to be deeply religious but rather uneducated, the Church felt they were in need of conveyance so that they did not support improper ideals like Socialism or Anarchism.

Meanwhile, Italian Prime Minister Giolitti understood that the time was ripe for cooperation between Catholics and the liberal system of government.

== The agreement ==
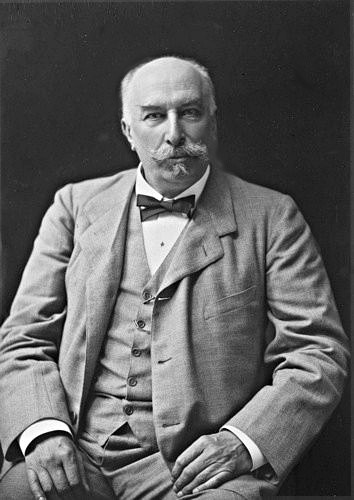
Italian Prime Minister Giovanni Giolitti

The Gentiloni Pact was born out of a secret deal in the run-up to the 1913 general election between Catholic voters and Giolitti's Liberal candidates who promised to support Catholic policies, especially funding of Catholic private schools and opposition to a law permitting divorce. It was estimated that over 200 deputies were elected through the Pact, enough to provide a majority for Giolitti.

The Italian Socialist Party gained votes (from 19% to 23% of the voters), while the liberals were strengthened in the short run. In the past, Giolitti had co-opted many moderate Socialists (as well as members of other fringe parties). Giolitti himself was against political parties, which he felt were divisive and harmful to the "gentleman's game" of politics.

The Gentiloni Pact was condemned by Socialists and anti-Clerical allies of Giolitti. They saw the Church as the bulwark against progress and felt betrayed in their alliance with Giolitti in the past. The Socialists would never trust Giolitti or the liberal system again.

This led the revolutionary faction of the Italian Socialist Party to gain strength in Italy, although the Vatican became increasingly influential in Italian politics as well.

Eventually, Giolitti was forced to resign by his anti-clerical allies in March 1914, and was replaced as prime minister by Antonio Salandra on appointment of King Victor Emmanuel III.

=== Composition ===
Party	Main ideology	Leader/s
Liberal Union	Liberalism	Giovanni Giolitti
Radical Party	Radicalism	Francesco Saverio Nitti
Italian Catholic Electoral Union	Christian democracy	Vincenzo Ottorino Gentiloni
Italian Reformist Socialist Party	Social democracy	Leonida Bissolati

== See also ==
- Italian general election, 1913
