= Conservatism in Italy =

Conservatism in Italy (Italian: conservatorismo) is the political philosophy and ideology of conservatism as it has developed in Italy. It seeks to uphold Italian culture with an emphasis on familialism and patriotism and is historically strongly associated with clericalism and monarchism as well as anti-communism. It has been a dominant ideology throughout Italy's modern history although with different expressions: during the interwar era it merged with fascism into a form of ultraconservatism, while the post-war era was characterised by the moderate conservatism of centre-right Christian democracy. Southern Italy is more traditionalist and patriotic, while northern Italy is more capitalist.

== History ==
=== 19th century ===
After unification, Italy was governed successively by the Historical Right, which represented conservative, liberal-conservative, and conservative-liberal positions, and the Historical Left.

=== Interwar period ===
After World War I, the country saw the emergence of its first mass parties, notably including the Italian People's Party (PPI), a Christian-democratic party that sought to represent the Catholic majority, which had long refrained from politics. The PPI and the Italian Socialist Party decisively contributed to the loss of strength and authority of the old liberal ruling class, which had not been able to structure itself into a proper party: the Liberal Union was not coherent and the Italian Liberal Party came too late.

In 1921, Benito Mussolini founded the National Fascist Party (PNF), and the next year, through the March on Rome, he was appointed Prime Minister by King Victor Emmanuel III. Fascism originated as a populist, revolutionary, anti-royalist, anti-clerical, and anti-conservative ideology, viewed by many socialists as a leftist heresy rather than a rightist opponent; but it transformed and became distinctly right-wing when it made compromises with the conservative establishment in order to consolidate authority and suppress communist movements. Mussolini commented on the dynamic pragmatism of fascism:

We do not believe in dogmatic programs. . . . We permit ourselves the luxury of being aristocratic and democratic, conservative and progressive, reactionary and revolutionary, legalists and illegalists, according to the circumstances of the moment, the place and the environment.

In 1926, all parties were dissolved except the PNF, which remained the only legal party in the Kingdom of Italy until the fall of the regime in July 1943. By 1945, fascists were discredited, disbanded, and outlawed, while Mussolini was executed in April that year.

=== Post-war era ===
In 1946, a referendum was held concerning the fate of the monarchy. While southern Italy and parts of northern Italy were royalist, other parts, especially in central Italy, were predominantly republican. The outcome was 54–46% in favour of a republic, leading to a collapse of the monarchy.

After World War II, the centre-right was dominated by the centrist party Christian Democracy (DC), which included both conservative and centre-left elements. With its landslide victory over the Italian Socialist Party and the Italian Communist Party in 1948, the political centre was in power. In Denis Mack Smith's words, it was "moderately conservative, reasonably tolerant of everything which did not touch religion or property, but above all Catholic and sometimes clerical". DC dominated politics until its dissolution in 1994, having governed for 47 out of 52 years. Among DC's frequent allies there was the conservative-liberal Italian Liberal Party. At the right of DC stood parties like the royalist Monarchist National Party and the post-fascist Italian Social Movement.

=== Modern era ===
In 1994, entrepreneur and media tycoon Silvio Berlusconi founded the liberal-conservative party Forza Italia (FI). He won three elections in 1994, 2001, and 2008, governing the country for almost ten years as prime minister. FI formed a coalitions with several parties, including the national-conservative National Alliance (AN), heir of the MSI, and the regionalist Lega Nord (LN). FI was briefly incorporated, along with AN, in The People of Freedom party and later revived in the new Forza Italia. After the 2018 general election, the LN and the Five Star Movement formed a populist government, which lasted about a year. In the 2022 general election, a centre-right coalition came to power, this time dominated by Brothers of Italy (FdI), a new national-conservative party born on the ashes of AN. Consequently, FdI, the re-branded Lega, and FI formed a government under FdI leader Giorgia Meloni.
