= Laura Bianchini =

Italian politician (1903–1983)

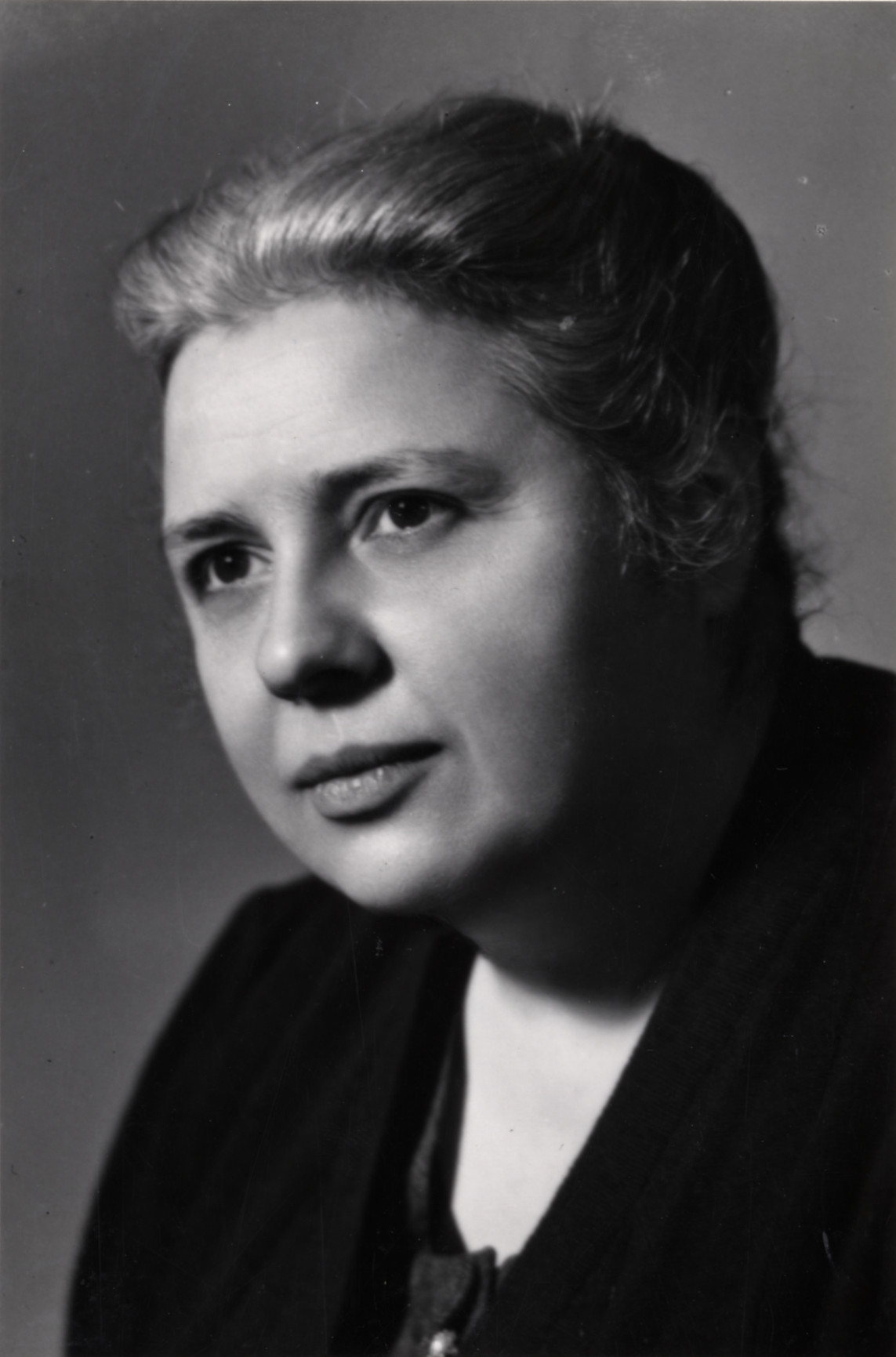
- Official portrait, 1948

Member of the Chamber of Deputies
- In office 1948–1953
- Constituency: Brescia

Member of the Constituent Assembly
- In office 1946–1948
- Constituency: Brescia

Member of the National Council
- In office 1945–1946
- Constituency: Brescia

Personal details
- Born: 23 August 1903 Castenedolo, Kingdom of Italy
- Died: 27 September 1983 (aged 80) Rome, Italy
- Party: Christian Democracy (DC)
- Education: Università Cattolica del Sacro Cuore
- Occupation: Schoolteacher; journalist; politician

Laura Bianchini (23 August 1903 – 27 September 1983) was an Italian educator and politician. She was elected to the Constituent Assembly in 1946 as part of the first group of women parliamentarians in Italy. She was subsequently elected to the Chamber of Deputies in 1948, serving until 1953.

== Biography ==
Bianchini was born in Castenedolo in 1903 to Caterina (née Ariccia) and Domenico. She attended the Università Cattolica del Sacro Cuore in Milan, earning a degree in philosophy and pedagogy. She subsequently worked as a teacher in Brescia. During World War II she became a member of the Brigate Fiamme Verdi and was in charge of its publication Il Ribelle.

After the war she was a member of the National Council from 1945 to 1946. She was a Christian Democracy candidate in Brescia in the 1946 general elections and was one of 21 women elected. She was elected to the Chamber of Deputies in the 1948 elections, serving in parliament until 1953.

After leaving parliament, she returned to teaching. After retiring in 1973, she died in Rome in 1983.
