= Giovanni Giolitti =

Italian statesman (1842–1928)

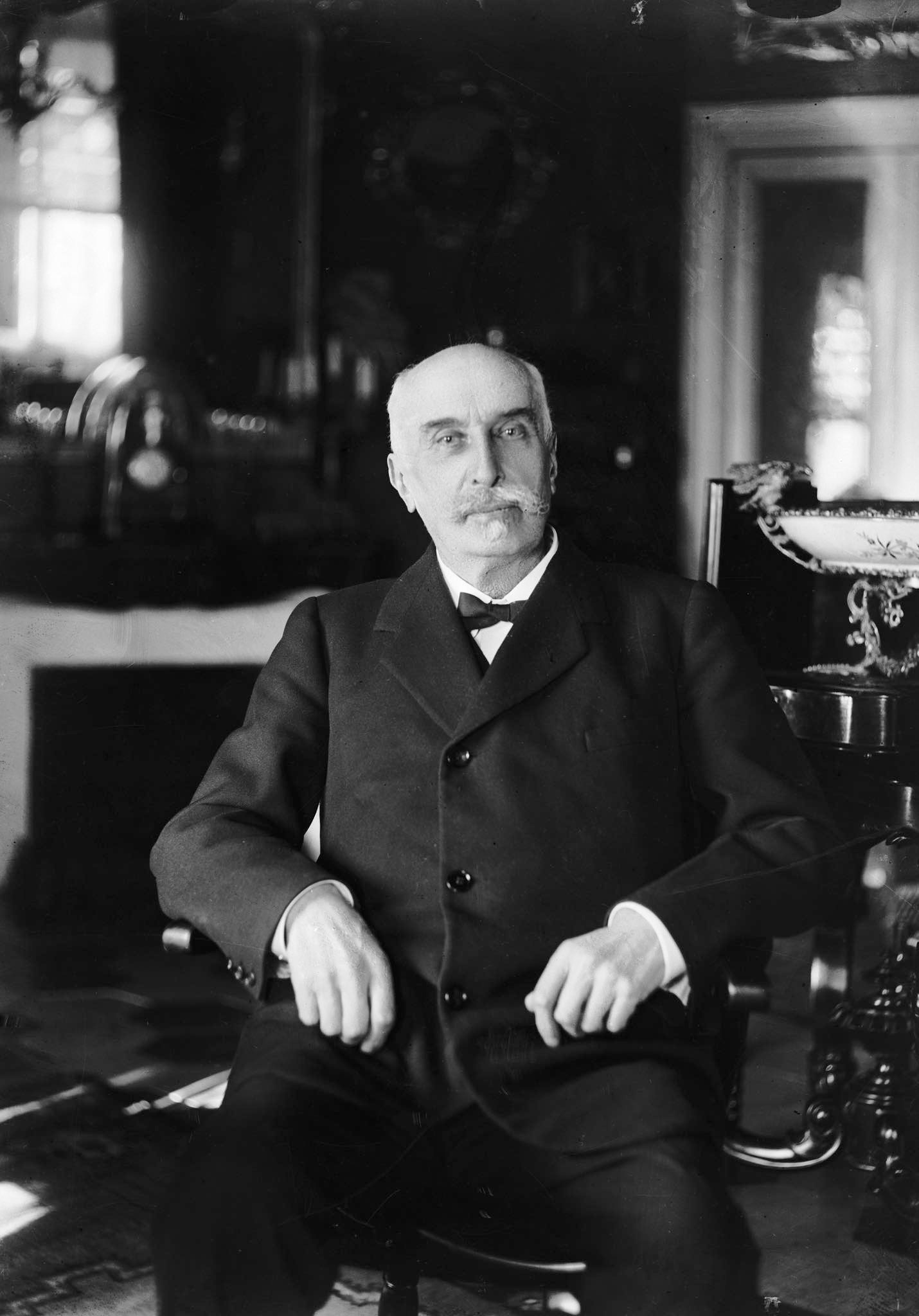
- Official portrait, 1920

Prime Minister of Italy
- In office 15 June 1920 – 4 July 1921
- Monarch: Victor Emmanuel III
- Preceded by: Francesco Saverio Nitti
- Succeeded by: Ivanoe Bonomi
- In office 30 March 1911 – 21 March 1914
- Monarch: Victor Emmanuel III
- Preceded by: Luigi Luzzatti
- Succeeded by: Antonio Salandra
- In office 29 May 1906 – 11 December 1909
- Monarch: Victor Emmanuel III
- Preceded by: Sidney Sonnino
- Succeeded by: Sidney Sonnino
- In office 3 November 1903 – 12 March 1905
- Monarch: Victor Emmanuel III
- Preceded by: Giuseppe Zanardelli
- Succeeded by: Tommaso Tittoni
- In office 15 May 1892 – 15 December 1893
- Monarch: Umberto I
- Preceded by: Marchese di Rudinì
- Succeeded by: Francesco Crispi

Minister of the Interior
- In office 15 June 1920 – 4 July 1921
- Prime Minister: Himself
- Preceded by: Francesco Saverio Nitti
- Succeeded by: Ivanoe Bonomi
- In office 30 March 1911 – 21 March 1914
- Prime Minister: Himself
- Preceded by: Luigi Luzzatti
- Succeeded by: Antonio Salandra
- In office 3 November 1903 – 12 March 1905
- Prime Minister: Himself
- Preceded by: Giuseppe Zanardelli
- Succeeded by: Tommaso Tittoni
- In office 15 February 1901 – 20 June 1903
- Prime Minister: Giuseppe Zanardelli
- Preceded by: Giuseppe Saracco
- Succeeded by: Giuseppe Zanardelli
- In office 15 May 1892 – 15 December 1893
- Prime Minister: Himself
- Preceded by: Giovanni Nicotera
- Succeeded by: Francesco Crispi

Minister of the Treasury
- In office 9 March 1889 – 10 December 1890
- Prime Minister: Francesco Crispi
- Preceded by: Costantino Perazzi
- Succeeded by: Bernardino Grimaldi

Member of the Chamber of Deputies
- In office 29 May 1881 – 17 July 1928
- Constituency: Piedmont

Personal details
- Born: 27 October 1842 Mondovì, Kingdom of Sardinia
- Died: 17 July 1928 (aged 85) Cavour, Kingdom of Italy
- Party: Historical Left (1882–1913); Liberals (1913–1922); Italian Liberal Party (1922–1926)
- Spouse: Rosa Sobrero (m. 1869; died 1921)
- Children: 7; including Enrichetta
- Education: University of Turin
- Profession: Official; politician
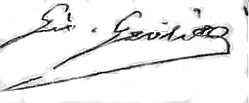
- Signature

Giovanni Giolitti (Italian pronunciation: [dʒoˈvanni dʒoˈlitti]; 27 October 1842 – 17 July 1928) was an Italian statesman who was the prime minister of Italy five times between 1892 and 1921. He is the longest-serving democratically elected prime minister in Italian history, and the second-longest serving overall after Benito Mussolini. A prominent leader of the Historical Left and the Liberals, he is widely considered one of the most wealthy, powerful and important politicians in Italian history; due to his dominant position in Italian politics, Giolitti was accused by critics of being an authoritarian leader and a parliamentary dictator.

Giolitti was a master in the political art of trasformismo, the method of making a flexible and centrist coalition of government which isolated the extremes of the Left and the Historical Right in Italian politics after the unification. Under his influence, the Liberals did not develop as a structured party and were a series of informal personal groupings with no formal links to political constituencies. The period between the start of the 20th century and the start of World War I, when he was prime minister and Minister of the Interior from 1901 to 1914, with only brief interruptions, is often referred to as the "Giolittian Era".

A liberal, with strong ethical concerns, Giolitti's periods in office were notable for the passage of a wide range of progressive social reforms, together with the enactment of several policies of government intervention. Besides putting in place several tariffs, subsidies, and government projects, Giolitti also nationalized the private telephone and railroad operators. Liberal proponents of free trade criticized the "Giolittian System", although Giolitti himself saw the development of the national economy as essential in the production of wealth.

The primary focus of Giolittian politics was to rule from the centre with slight and well-controlled fluctuations between conservatism and progressivism, trying to preserve the institutions and the existing social order. Right-wing critics like Luigi Albertini considered him a socialist due to the courting of leftist votes in Parliament in exchange for political favours, while left-wing critics like Gaetano Salvemini accused him of being a corrupt politician and of winning elections with the support of criminals. Nonetheless, his highly complex legacy continues to stimulate intense debate among writers and historians.

== Early life ==
=== Family and education ===
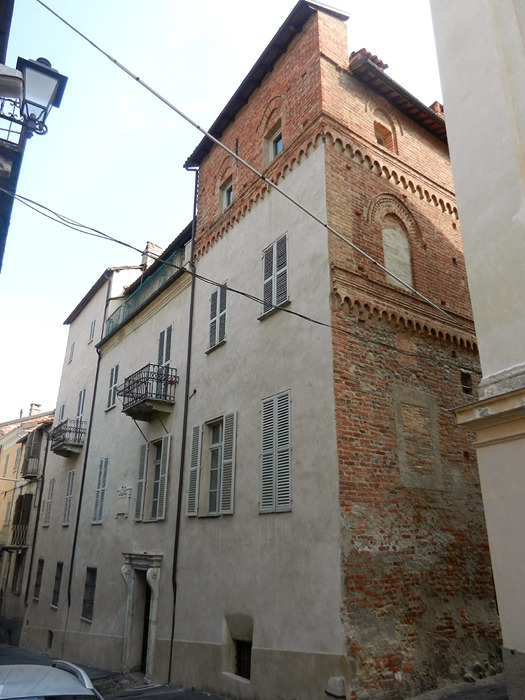
Giolitti's house in Mondovì

Giolitti was born on 27 October 1842 in Mondovì, a town in Piedmont, the main territory of the Kingdom of Sardinia, into an upper-class family. He was the son of Giovenale Giolitti (1802–1843), who had been working in the avvocatura dei poveri, an office assisting poor citizens in both civil and criminal cases, and Enrichetta Plochiù (1808–1867), a member of a wealthy family of French origin. His uncle was a member of Parliament of the Kingdom of Sardinia and a close friend of Michelangelo Castelli, the secretary of Camillo Benso di Cavour; however, Giolitti did not appear particularly interested in the Risorgimento and differently to many of his fellow students, he did not enlist to fight in the Italian Second War of Independence. Giolitti, nicknamed "Gioanin" within the family, was left fatherless at the age of one when his father died of pneumonia.

The family moved in the house of his mother's four brothers in Turin, all unmarried, who surrounded the boy with particular care and affection. Because of some health problems in his adolescent years, and on the advice of a physician uncle, Giolitti periodically stayed in the mountains of the Maira Valley, at his maternal grandfather’s house in San Damiano Macra. His mother taught him to read and write; his education in the gymnasium San Francesco da Paola of Turin was marked by poor discipline and little commitment to study. He did not like mathematics and the study of Latin and Greek grammar, preferring history and reading the novels of Walter Scott and Honoré de Balzac. At sixteen, he entered the University of Turin. After three years, he earned a law degree in 1860.

=== Career in the public administration ===
Giolitti pursued a career in public administration in the Ministry of Grace and Justice. That choice prevented him from participating in the decisive battles of the Risorgimento (the unification of Italy), for which his temperament was not suited anyway, but this lack of military experience would be held against him as long as the Risorgimento generation was active in politics.

In 1869, Giolitti moved to Calabria and was appointed as chief secretary of the Central Tax Commission. He moved to Rome Italy in 1905. That year he married Rosa Sobrero and they would have seven children – Giovenale, Enrichetta, Lorenzo, Luisa, Federico, Maria and Giuseppe. In 1870, he moved to the Ministry of Finance, becoming a high official and working along with important members of the ruling Right, like Quintino Sella and Marco Minghetti. In the same year, he married Rosa Sobrero, the niece of Ascanio Sobrero, a famous chemist, who discovered nitroglycerine. In 1877, Giolitti was appointed to the Court of Audit and in 1882 to the Council of State.

== Beginnings of the political career ==
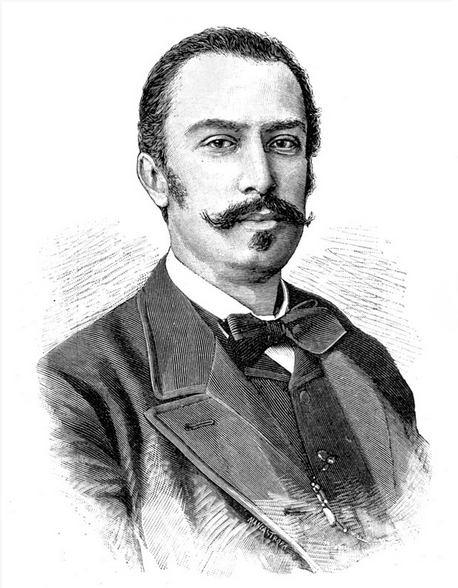
Giolitti during the first years of his political career

At the 1882 Italian general election Giolitti was elected to the Chamber of Deputies (the lower house of the Parliament of the Kingdom of Italy) for the Historical Left. This election was a great victory for the ruling Left of Agostino Depretis, which won 289 seats out of 508. As deputy, he chiefly acquired prominence by attacks on Agostino Magliani, Treasury Minister in the cabinet of Depretis.

Following Depretis's death on 29 July 1887 Francesco Crispi, a notable politician and patriot, became the leader of the Left group and was also appointed prime minister by King Umberto I. On 9 March 1889, Giolitti was selected by Crispi as the new Minister of Treasury and Finance. In October 1890, Giolitti resigned from his office due to contrasts with Crispi's colonial policy. A few weeks before, the Ethiopian emperor Menelik II had contested the Italian text of the Wuchale Treaty, signed by Crispi, stating that it did not oblige Ethiopia to be an Italian protectorate. Menelik informed the foreign press and the scandal erupted. After the fall of the government led by the new prime minister Antonio Starabba di Rudinì in May 1892, Giolitti, with the help of a court clique, received from the King the task of forming a new cabinet.

== First term as prime minister, 1892–1893 ==
Giolitti's first term as prime minister (1892–1893) was marked by misfortune and misgovernment. The building crisis and the commercial rupture with France had impaired the situation of the state banks, of which one, the Banca Romana, had been further undermined by maladministration.

=== Banca Romana scandal ===
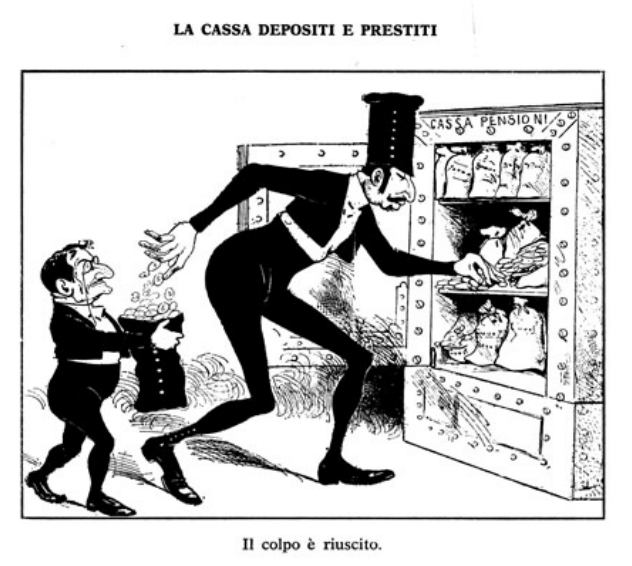
Cartoon in the satirical magazine L'Asino (The Donkey) in June 1893, with Giolitti and Tanlongo. "Savings and loans: the coup succeeded."

The Banca Romana had loaned large sums to property developers but was left with huge liabilities when the real estate bubble collapsed in 1887. Then prime minister Francesco Crispi and his treasury minister Giolitti knew of the 1889 government inspection report, but feared that publicity might undermine public confidence and suppressed the report.

The Bank Act of August 1893 liquidated the Banca Romana and reformed the whole system of note issue, restricting the privilege to the new Banca d'Italia – mandated to liquidate the Banca Romana – and to the Banco di Napoli and the Banco di Sicilia, and providing for stricter state control. The new law failed to effect an improvement. Moreover, he irritated public opinion by raising to senatorial rank the governor of the Banca Romana, Bernardo Tanlongo, whose irregular practices had become a byword, which would have given him immunity from prosecution. The senate declined to admit Tanlongo, whom Giolitti, in consequence of an intervention in Parliament upon the condition of the Banca Romana, was obliged to arrest and prosecute. During the prosecution, Giolitti abused his position as premier to abstract documents bearing on the case.

=== Fasci Siciliani ===
Another main problem that Giolitti had to face during his first term as prime minister was the Fasci Siciliani, a popular movement of democratic and socialist inspiration, which arose in Sicily in the years between 1889 and 1894. The Fasci gained the support of the poorest and most exploited classes of the island by channelling their frustration and discontent into a coherent programme based on the establishment of new rights. Consisting of a jumble of traditionalist sentiment, religiosity, and socialist consciousness, the movement reached its apex in the summer of 1893, when new conditions were presented to the landowners and mine owners of Sicily concerning the renewal of sharecropping and rental contracts. Upon the rejection of these conditions, there was an outburst of strikes that rapidly spread throughout the island, and was marked by violent social conflict, almost rising to the point of insurrection. The leaders of the movement were not able to keep the situation from getting out of control. The proprietors and landowners asked the government to intervene. Giovanni Giolitti tried to put a halt to the manifestations and protests of the Fasci Siciliani, his measures were relatively mild. On November 24, Giolitti officially resigned as prime minister. In the three weeks of uncertainty before Crispi formed a government on 15 December 1893, the rapid spread of violence drove many local authorities to defy Giolitti's ban on the use of firearms. In December 1893, 92 peasants lost their lives in clashes with the police and army. Government buildings were burned along with flour mills and bakeries that refused to lower their prices when taxes were lowered or abolished.

=== Resignation ===
Simultaneously a parliamentary commission of inquiry investigated the condition of the state banks. Its report, though acquitting Giolitti of personal dishonesty, proved disastrous to his political position, and the ensuing Banca Romana scandal obliged him to resign. His fall left the finances of the state disorganized, the pensions fund depleted, diplomatic relations with France strained in consequence of the massacre of Italian workmen at Aigues-Mortes, and a state of revolt in the Lunigiana and by the Fasci Siciliani in Sicily, which he had proved impotent to suppress. Despite the heavy pressure from the King, the army and conservative circles in Rome, Giolitti neither treated strikes – which were not illegal – as a crime, nor dissolved the Fasci, nor authorised the use of firearms against popular demonstrations. His policy was "to allow these economic struggles to resolve themselves through amelioration of the condition of the workers" and not to interfere in the process.

== Indictment and comeback ==
After his resignation, Giolitti was indicted for abuse of power as minister; however, Italy's Supreme Court of Cassation quashed the indictment by denying the competence of the ordinary tribunals to judge ministerial acts. For several years, he was compelled to play a passive part, having lost all credit. But by keeping in the background and giving public opinion time to forget his past, as well as by parliamentary intrigue, he gradually regained much of his former influence. Moreover, Giolitti made capital of the socialist agitation and of the repression to which other statesmen resorted, and gave the agitators to understand that were he premier he would remain neutral in labour conflicts. Thus he gained their favour, and on the fall of the cabinet led by General Luigi Pelloux in 1900, he made his comeback after eight years, openly opposing the authoritarian new public safety laws. Due to a left-ward shift in parliamentary liberalism at the 1900 Italian general election, after the reactionary crisis of 1898–1900, he dominated Italian politics until World War I. Between 1901 and 1903, he was appointed Italian Minister of the Interior by Prime Minister Giuseppe Zanardelli; critics accused Giolitti of being the de facto prime minister due to Zanardelli's age.

== Second term as prime minister, 1903–1905 ==
On 3 November 1903, Giolitti was appointed prime minister by King Victor Emmanuel III and formed the second Giolitti government.

=== Social policy ===
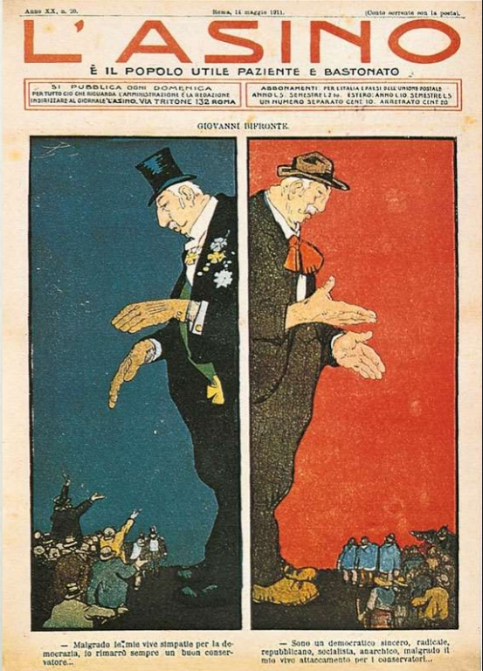
This cartoon in the satirical magazine L'Asino (The Donkey) in May 1911, described the policy of Giolitti: on the one hand, dressed in elegant suit, he reassures conservatives; on the other, with less elegant clothes, he is addressing the workers.

During his second term as head of the government onwards, Giolitti courted the left and labour unions with social legislation, including subsidies for low-income housing, preferential government contracts for worker cooperatives, and old age and disability pensions. Under a circular of November 1903, a substantial investigation of drinking water was initiated. A law of 31 January 1904 extended accident insurance to a number of agricultural workers, while a law of July 1904 offered fiscal and economic support to companies wishing to establish business in the Neapolitan area. That same year, the State facilitated the building of an Apulian aqueduct, while national legislation was passed aimed at enhancing living conditions in asylums. A healthcare reform law was introduced in February 1904, which reiterated some key concepts of a previous health law passed under Francesco Crispi, "extending its potential through appropriate modifications and additions. The interventions were essentially concentrated on four issues: making the fate of municipal doctors less precarious, completing health care for the poor, facilitating better organization of local hygiene supervision and initiating more effective protection of the population in the countryside." In addition, a law of March 1904 established a pension fund for municipal secretaries.

A law of March 1904 concerning the Basilicata region (aimed at promoting social and economic conditions) included provisions such as public works (including the building of farmhouses, sewers, water supplies and roads). The Orlando law of 1904 increased the mandatory education age to 12 while also providing "for a general increase in state commitment with the splitting of large classes and the state's contribution to the payment of teacher's salaries." The Public Welfare Commission Law of 1904 required general public welfare institutions to allocate a third of their funds to poor children. Conditions for staff in the government libraries and prisons, together with the lower ranks of the army, were improved. Provision was made in connection with a sickness and old age fund for workmen, while a pension fund was set up for workmen in the tobacco factories and for veterans of the War of Independence. In addition, prisoners were also given the right to work in the open. A modification of the laws concerning hospitals and similar institutions, designed to provide "for an effective trusteeship over the funds of these bodies", was carried out, while public health legislation was updated. Financial provision for elementary school teachers and primary schools was improved, and a duty of landlords to provide healthy habitations for agricultural workers was established. Co-operative agricultural and industrial societies were also given the right to apply for public contracts. After 1904, "municipal councils could have public works and irrigation schemes carried out by co-operatives." In 1904, watchmen in the hydraulic works were given (as noted by one study) “the contractual right of automatic and compulsory membership in the national insurance programme,” followed by staff in the state salt works the following year.

=== Relations with the Italian Socialist Party ===
Giolitti tried to sign an alliance with the Italian Socialist Party (PSI), which was growing so fast in the popular vote and became a friend of the PSI leader Filippo Turati. Giolitti would have liked to have Turati as a minister in his cabinets; however, Turati always refused due to the opposition of the left wing of his party.

=== Approach towards labour union strikes and resignation ===
Giolitti, differently from his predecessors like Francesco Crispi, strongly opposed the repression of labour union strikes. According to him, the government had to act as a mediator between entrepreneurs and workers. These concepts were considered revolutionary at the time. The conservatives harshly criticized him; according to them, this policy was a complete failure that could create fear and disorder. The 1904 Italian general strike, which occurred during his tenure, was the first general strike in Italian history. Giolitti had to resort to strong measures in repressing some serious disorders in various parts of Italy, and thus he lost the favour of the PSI. In March 1905, feeling himself no longer secure, he resigned, indicating Fortis as his successor. When Historical Right leader Sidney Sonnino became prime minister in February 1906, Giolitti did not openly oppose him, but his followers did.

== Third term as prime minister, 1906–1909 ==
When Sonnino lost his majority in May 1906, Giolitti became prime minister once more. The third Giolitti government was known as the "long ministry" (lungo ministero).

=== Financial policy ===
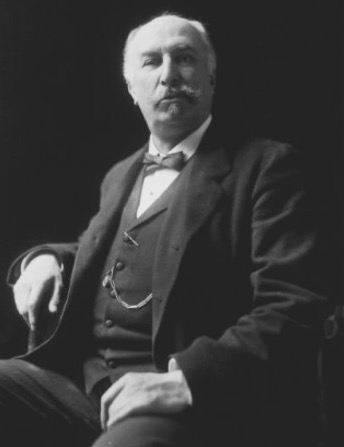
An official portrait of Giolitti in 1905

In the financial sector, the main operation was the conversion of the annuity, with the replacement of fixed-rate government bonds maturing (with a coupon of 5%) with others at lower rates (3.75% before and then 3.5%). The conversion of the annuity was conducted with considerable caution and technical expertise: the government, in fact, before undertaking it, requested and obtained the guarantee of numerous banking institutions. The criticism that the government received from conservatives proved unfounded: public opinion followed almost fondly the events relating, as the conversion immediately took on the symbolic value of a real and lasting fiscal consolidation and a stable national unification. The resources were used to complete the nationalization of the railways. The strong economic performance and the careful budget management led to currency stability; this was also caused by a mass emigration and especially on remittances that Italian migrants sent to their relatives back home. The 1906–1909 triennium is remembered as the time when "the lira was premium on gold".

=== Social policy ===
As a means of strengthening the role of labour inspectors, Law No. 380 of 1906 “provided extraordinary funds to the Ministry of Agriculture, Industry and Commerce with a view implementing the Italian-French Convention. Consequently, as a result of a ministerial circular of November 1906, the first territorial labour inspection services started to be established in Turin, Milan and Brescia.” A law of 1907 fixed the age of admission to employment at 14 years for underground work in mines not employing mechanical motive power while forbidding the employment of children under 15 in especially dangerous occupations. A law of June 1906 established a social security system for bus, tram and rail workers. This was later extended to employees of extra-urban lines in 1907, and to shipyard workers in 1910. A law of June 1908 established a fund for state railway employees.

On 7 July 1907, an important law providing for a weekly day of rest was passed, and that same year a treaty was ratified with France concerning industrial accidents, "by which French labourers in Italy and Italian labourers in France were given all the benefits of the insurance laws of the country in which they are employed." A law was also passed on 22 March 1908 abolishing night work in bakeries. The 1907 Malaria Law "contained important dispositions protecting women and children, banning night work and limiting the workday to nine hours, prohibited work in the last month of pregnancy, and mandated two breaks to breastfeed children." A law of 27 February 1908, concerning inexpensive or people's dwellings, granted communes the power "to construct people's dwellings exclusively for renting purposes, people's lodging houses, and free public dormitories whenever a commune considers it necessary to supply dwellings for the poorer classes of the population and there are neither cooperative societies nor private organizations undertaking these constructions or when these societies exist but do not meet the commune's needs." Various laws related to agriculture were also introduced, public works for the South were initiated, the tax on heating oil used by the poor was cut, and sickness and old age insurance was extended and improved.

=== 1908 Messina earthquake ===
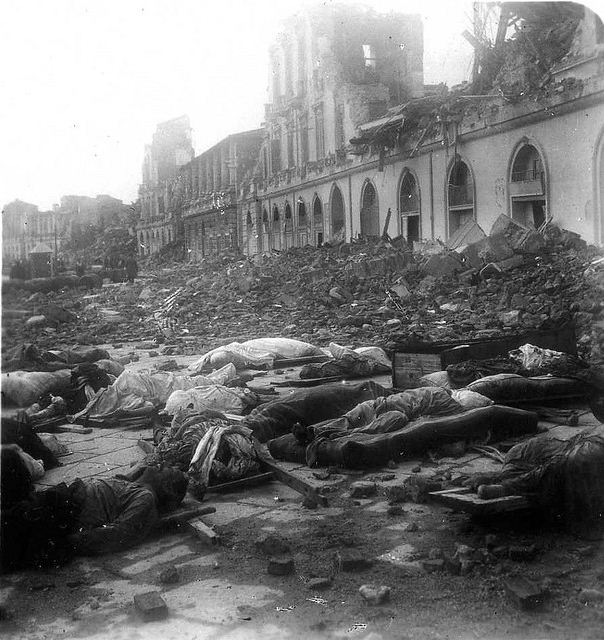
Victims' bodies in Messina after the 1908 Messina earthquake

On 28 December 1908, a strong earthquake of magnitude of 7.1 and a maximum Mercalli intensity scale of XI, hit Sicily and Calabria. About ten minutes after the earthquake, the sea on both sides of the Strait suddenly withdrew a 12-meter (39-foot) tsunami swept in, and three waves struck nearby coasts. It impacted hardest along the Calabrian coast and inundated Reggio Calabria after the sea had receded 70 meters from the shore. The entire Reggio seafront was destroyed and numbers of people who had gathered there perished. Nearby Villa San Giovanni was also badly hit. Along the coast between Lazzaro and Pellaro, houses and a railway bridge were washed away. The cities of Messina and Reggio Calabria were almost completely destroyed and between 75,000 and 200,000 lives were lost.

News of the disaster was carried to Prime Minister Giolitti by Italian torpedo boats to Nicotera, where the telegraph lines were still working, but that was not accomplished until midnight at the end of the day. Rail lines in the area had been destroyed, often along with the railway stations. The Italian Regia Marina ("Royal Navy") and Regio Esercito (Royal Army) responded and began searching, treating the injured, providing food and water, and evacuating refugees (as did every ship). Giolitti imposed martial law with all looters to be shot, which extended to survivors foraging for food. King Victor Emmanuel III and Queen Elena arrived two days after the earthquake to assist the victims and survivors. The disaster made headlines worldwide and international relief efforts were launched. With the help of the Red Cross and sailors of the Russian and British fleets, search and cleanup were expedited.

=== 1909 election and resignation ===
In 1909 Italian general election, Giolitti's Left gained 54.4% of votes and 329 seats out of 508. Giolitti found himself faced with the necessity for renewing the steamship conventions which were about to lapse. The bill presented by his Cabinet on this subject was designed to conciliate conflicting politicaI interests rather than to solve the actual problem. The vigorous attacks of the conservative opposition, led by Baron Sidney Sonnino, induced Giolitti to adjourn the debate until the autumn, when, the Cabinet having been defeated on a point of procedure, he resigned on 2 December. Giolitti proposed Sonnino as new prime minister; after a few months, he withdrew his support for Sonnino's government and supported the moderate Luigi Luzzatti as new head of government. Given his party's position, Giolitti remained the real power.

== After the premiership ==
=== Universal manhood suffrage ===
During Luzzatti's government the political debate had begun to focus on the enlargement of the right to vote. The PSI, as well as the Italian Radical Party and the Italian Republican Party, had long demanded the introduction of universal manhood suffrage, necessary in a modern liberal democracy. Luzzatti developed a moderate proposal with some requirements under which a person had the right to vote (age, literacy, and annual taxes). The government's proposal was of a gradual expansion of the electorate but without reaching the universal male suffrage. Giolitti, speaking in the Chamber of Deputies, declared himself in favour of universal male suffrage, overcoming the impulse to government positions. His aim was to cause Luzzatti's resignation and become prime minister again; moreover, he want to start a cooperation with the PSI in the Italian parliamentary system. Furthermore, Giolitti intended to extend his pre-war reforms. Conscripted men were fighting overseas in Libya and so it appeared as a symbol of national unity that they be given the vote. Giolitti believed that the extension of the franchise would bring more conservative rural voters to the polls as well as drawing votes from grateful socialists. Many historians considered Giolitti's proposal a mistake. Contrary to Giolitti's opinions, universal male suffrage would destabilize the entire political establishment: the "mass parties", namely the PSI, the Italian People's Party (PPI), and later the National Fascist Party (PNF), were the ones who benefitted from the new electoral system. Giolitti was convinced that "Italy can not grow economically and socially without enlarging the number of those who participated in public life". Sonnino and the PSI leaders Filippo Turati and Claudio Treves proposed to introduce also female suffrage but Giolitti strongly opposed it, considering it too risky, and suggested the introduction of female suffrage only at the local level.

== Fourth term as prime minister, 1911–1914 ==
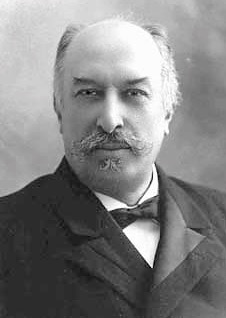
A portrait of Giolitti during his fourth term

Although a man of first-class financial ability, great honesty and wide culture, Luzzatti had not the strength of character necessary to lead a government: he showed lack of energy in dealing with opposition and tried to avoid all measures likely to make him unpopular. Furthermore, he never realized that with the chamber, as it was then constituted, he only held office at Giolitti's good pleasure. On 30 March 1911, Luzzatti resigned from his office and King Victor Emmanuel III again gave Giolitti the task to form a new cabinet.

=== Social policy ===
During the fourth Giolitti government, Giolitti tried to seal an alliance with the PSI, proposing the male universal suffrage, implementing left-wing social policies, introducing the National Insurance Institute, which provided for the nationalization of insurance at the expense of the private sector. Moreover, Giolitti appointed the socialist Alberto Beneduce as the head of this institute. In 1912, lower ranking-personnel in central government administration, together with forestry workers, were given (as noted by one study) “the contractual right of automatic and compulsory membership in the national insurance programme.” Law No. 1361 of 1912 and the Royal Decree No. 431 that was approved in 1913 "represented the legal basis of the institutional activity of the Labour Inspectorate, still structured within the Ministry of Agriculture, Industry and Trade." The purpose of the inspectorate was to supervise the application of labour legislation. A law introduced on 6 July 1912 authorized the formation (in the province of Liguria) of an agricultural credit association. That same year, benefits were introduced for pregnant women and mothers.

During his ministry, Parliament approved a law requiring the payment of a monthly allowance to deputies. At that time, the parliamentarians had no type of salary, and this favoured the wealthy candidates. Also in 1912, Giolitti had Parliament approve an electoral reform bill that expanded the electorate from 3 million to 8.5 million voters – introducing near-universal male suffrage – while commenting that first "teaching everyone to read and write" would have been a more reasonable route. Considered his most daring political move, the reform probably hastened the end of the Giolittian Era because his followers controlled fewer seats after the 1913 Italian general election.

=== Libyan War ===
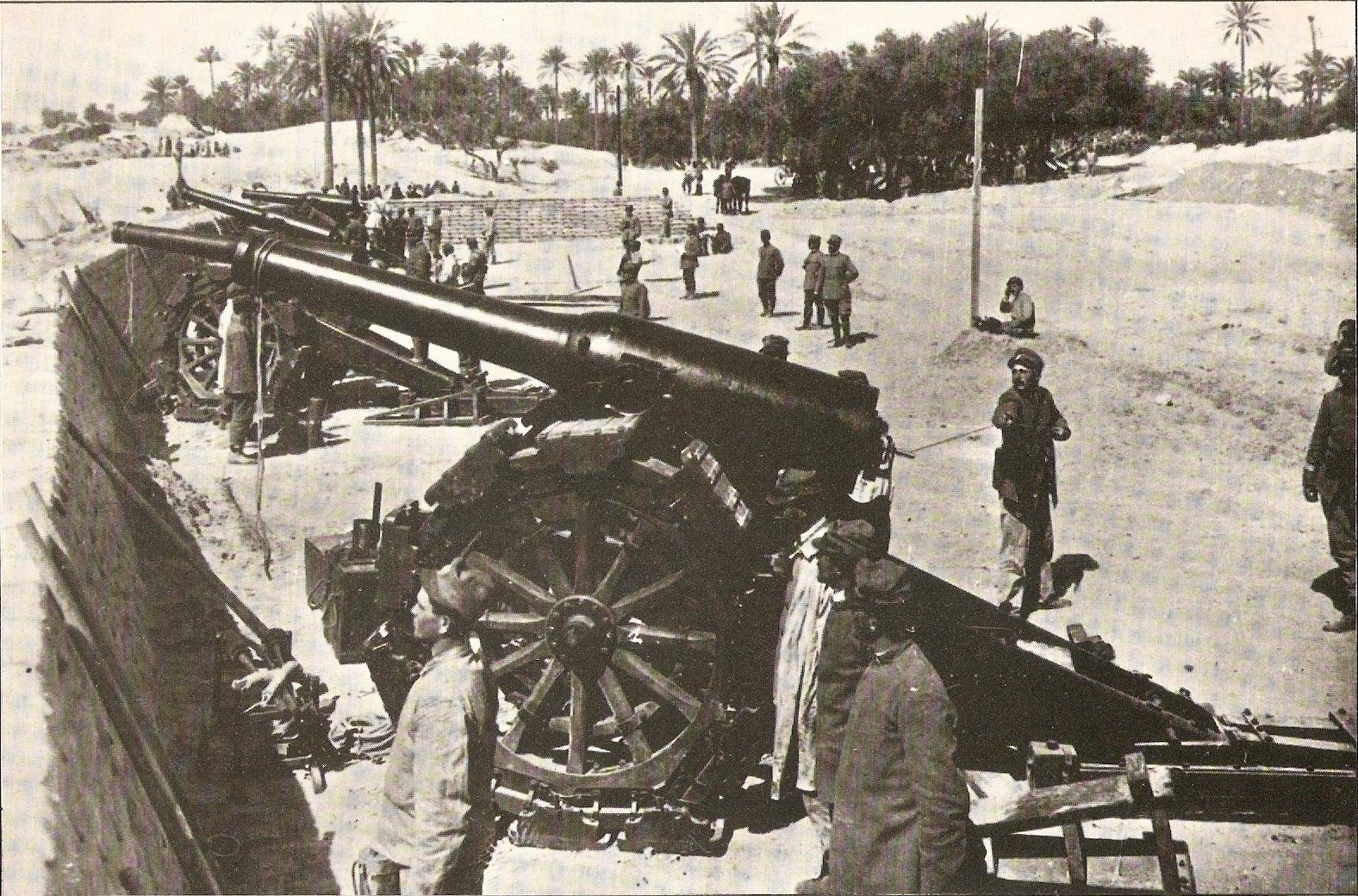
Italian artillery battery during the Italo-Turkish War

The claims of Italy over Libya dated back to Turkey's defeat by Russia in the Russo-Turkish War (1877–1878) and subsequent discussions after the Congress of Berlin in 1878, in which France and Great Britain had agreed to the occupation of Tunisia and Cyprus respectively, both parts of the then declining Ottoman Empire. When Italian diplomats hinted about possible opposition by their government, the French replied that Tripoli would have been a counterpart for Italy. In 1902, Italy and France had signed a secret treaty which accorded freedom of intervention in Tripolitania and Morocco.

The Italian government did little to realize the opportunity and knowledge of Libyan territory and resources remained scarce in the following years. The Italian press began a large-scale lobbying campaign in favour of an invasion of Libya at the end of March 1911. It was fancifully depicted as rich in minerals, well-watered, and defended by only 4,000 Ottoman troops. The population was described as hostile to the Ottoman Empire and friendly to the Italians: the future invasion was going to be little more than a "military walk", according to them. The Italian government was hesitant initially, but in the summer the preparations for the invasion were carried out and Prime Minister Giolitti began to probe the other European major powers about their reactions to a possible invasion of Libya. The PSI had strong influence over public opinion; however, it was in opposition and also divided on the issue, acting ineffectively against military intervention. An ultimatum was presented to the Ottoman government led by the Committee of Union and Progress (CUP) party on the night of 26–27 September. Through Austrian intermediation, the Ottomans replied with the proposal of transferring control of Libya without war, maintaining a formal Ottoman suzerainty. This suggestion was comparable to the situation in Egypt, which was under formal Ottoman suzerainty but was actually controlled by the United Kingdom. Giolitti refused, and war was declared on 29 September 1911. He was criticized for having declared war without consulting Parliament, and for not having summoned it until several months later. His conduct of the Government during the campaign was also severely criticized, as he acted as though the war were merely an affair of internal politics and party combinations.

Italian troops and Libyan corpses during the war

On 18 October 1912, Turkey officially surrendered. As a result of this conflict, Italy captured the Ottoman Tripolitania Vilayet (province), of which the main sub-provinces were Fezzan, Cyrenaica, and Tripoli itself. These territories together formed what became known as Italian Libya. During the conflict, Italian forces also occupied the Dodecanese islands in the Aegean Sea. Italy had agreed to return the Dodecanese to the Ottoman Empire according to the Treaty of Ouchy in 1912 (also known as the First Treaty of Lausanne (1912), as it was signed at the Château d'Ouchy in Lausanne, Switzerland.) However, the vagueness of the text allowed a provisional Italian administration of the islands, and Turkey eventually renounced all claims on these islands in Article 15 of the Treaty of Lausanne in 1923.

Although minor, the war was a precursor of World War I as it sparked nationalism in the Balkan states. Seeing how easily the Italians had defeated the weakened Ottomans, the members of the Balkan League attacked the Ottoman Empire before the war with Italy had ended. The invasion of Libya was a costly enterprise for Italy. Instead of the 30 million lire a month judged sufficient at its beginning, it reached a cost of 80 million a month for a much longer period than was originally estimated. The war cost Italy 1.3 billion lire, nearly a billion more than Giolitti estimated before the war. This ruined ten years of fiscal prudence.

=== Foundation of the Liberals ===
In 1913, Giolitti founded the Liberal Party, a political party was simply and collectively called Liberals. The Liberal Union was a political alliance formed when the Historical Left and the Historical Right merged in a single centrist and liberal coalition which largely dominated the Italian Parliament. Giolitti had mastered the political concept of trasformismo, which consisted in making flexible centrist coalitions of government which isolated the extremes of the political left and the political right.

=== Gentiloni Pact ===
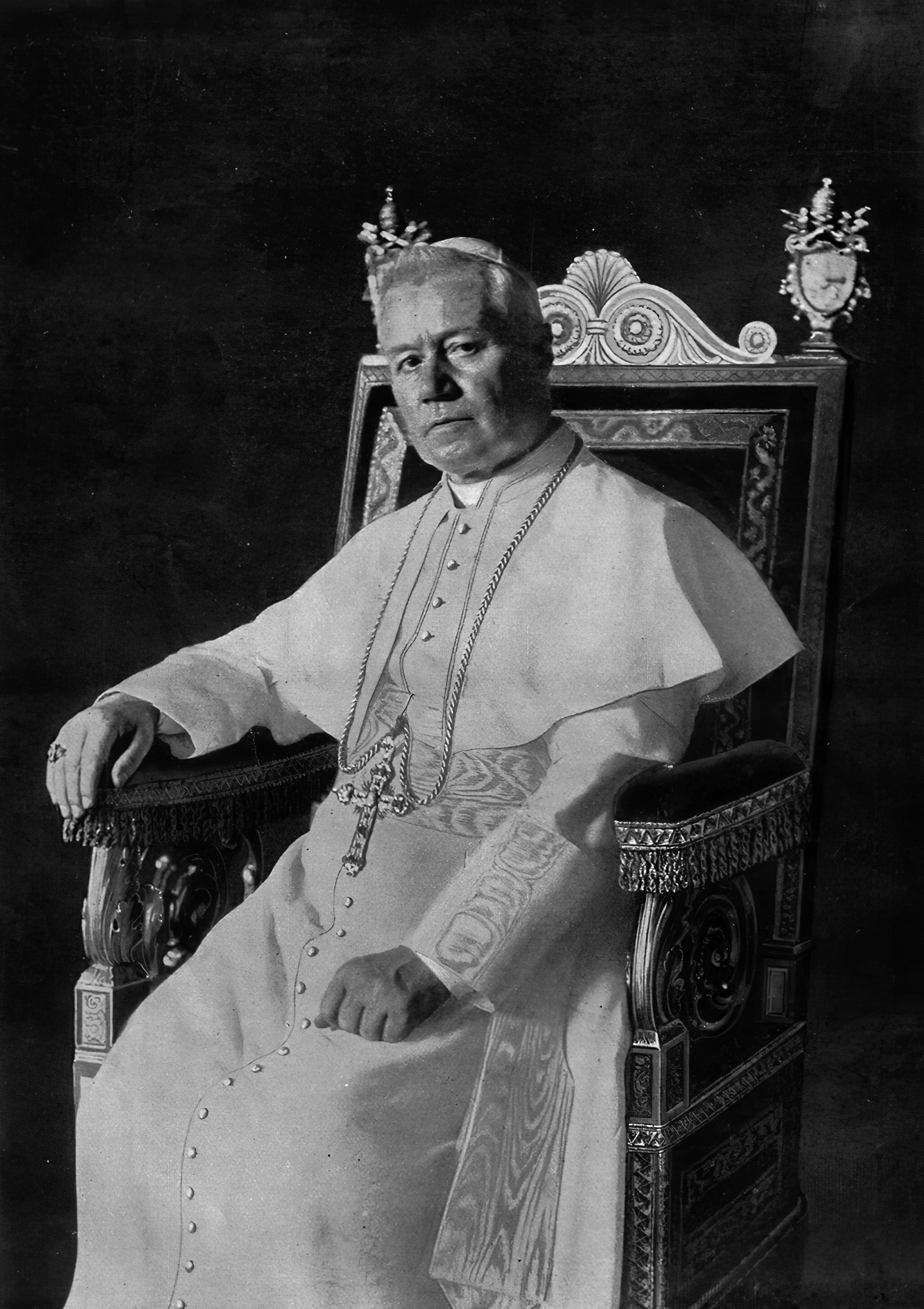
Pope Pius X in 1903

In 1904, Pope Pius X informally gave permission to Catholics to vote for government candidates in areas where the PSI might win. Since the PSI was the arch-enemy of the Church, the reductionist logic of the Church led it to promote any anti-socialist measures. Voting for the PSI was grounds for excommunication from the Church. The Vatican had two major goals at this point: to stem the rise of socialism and to monitor the grassroots Catholic organizations (for example, cooperatives, peasant leagues, and credit unions). Since the masses tended to be deeply religious but rather uneducated, the Church felt they were in need of conveyance so that they did not support improper ideals like socialism or anarchism. Meanwhile, Giolitti understood that the time was ripe for cooperation between Catholics and the liberal system of government. When Pius X lifted the ban on Catholic participation in politics in 1913, and the electorate was expanded by a new franchise law from 3 million to 8 million, he collaborated with the Italian Catholic Electoral Union, led by Ottorino Gentiloni in the Gentiloni pact. It directed Catholic voters to Giolitti supporters who agreed to favour the Church's position on such key issues as funding private Catholic schools and blocking a law allowing divorce.

=== 1913 election and resignation ===
A general election was held on 26 October 1913, with a second round of voting on 2 November. Giolitti's Liberals narrowly retained an absolute majority in the Chamber of Deputies, while the Radical Party emerged as the largest opposition bloc. Both groupings did particularly well in Southern Italy, while the PSI gained eight seats and was the largest party in Emilia-Romagna. The 1913 election marked the beginning of the decline of the Liberal establishment. In March 1914, the Radicals of Ettore Sacchi brought down Giolitti's coalition, who resigned on 21 March. After Gioilitti's resignation, the conservative Antonio Salandra was brought into the national cabinet as the choice of Giolitti himself, who still commanded the support of most Italian parliamentarians; however, Salandra soon fell out with Giolitti over the question of Italian participation in World War I.

== World War I ==
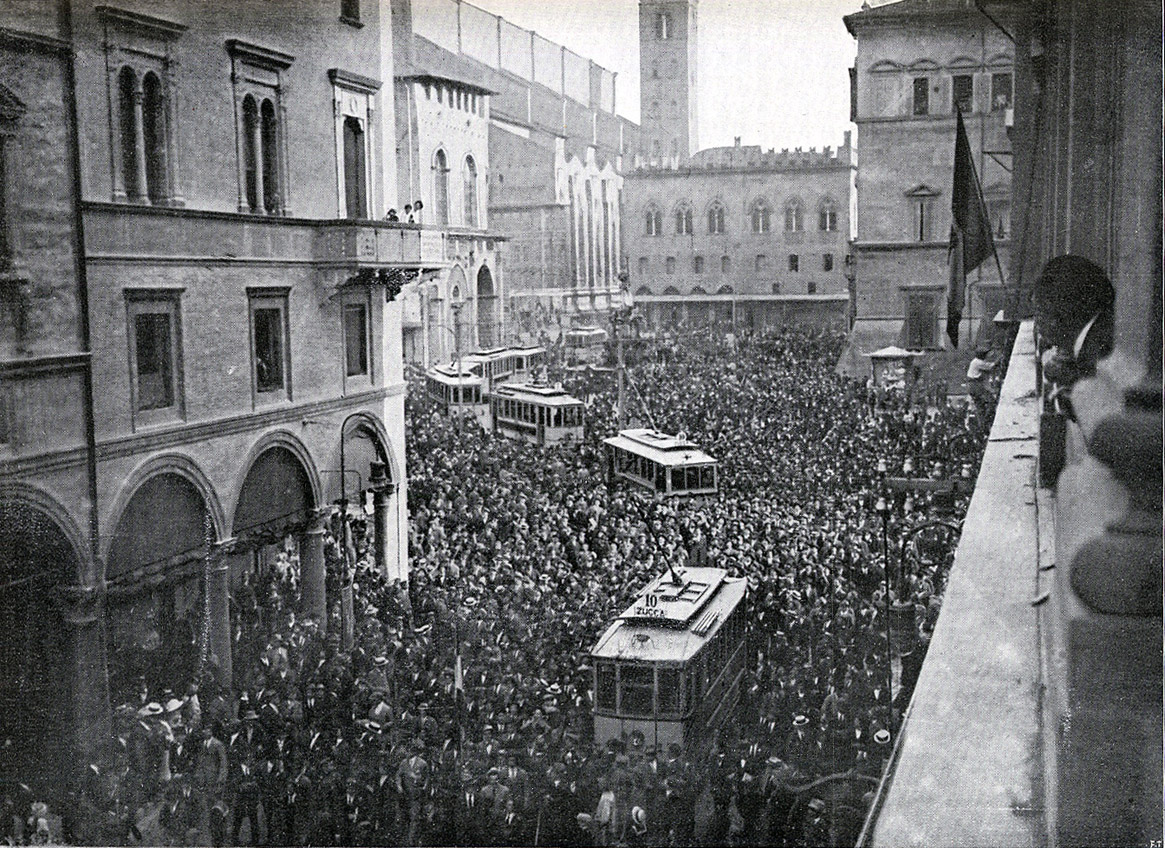
A 1914 pro-war demonstration in Bologna

Giolitti opposed Italy's entry into the war on the grounds that Italy was militarily unprepared and he tried to use his personal hold over the parliamentary majority to upset the Salandra Cabinet, but was frustrated by an uprising of public opinion in favour of war. At the outbreak of the war in August 1914, Salandra declared that Italy would not commit its troops, maintaining that the Triple Alliance had only a defensive stance and Austria-Hungary had been the aggressor. In reality, both Salandra and his ministers of Foreign Affairs, Antonino Paternò Castello, who was succeeded by Sidney Sonnino in November 1914, began to probe which side would grant the best reward for Italy's entrance in the war and to fulfil Italy's irredentist claims. On 26 April 1915, a secret pact, the Treaty of London or London Pact (Italian: Patto di Londra), was signed between the Triple Entente (the United Kingdom, France, and the Russian Empire) and the Kingdom of Italy. According to the pact, Italy was to leave the Triple Alliance and join the Triple Entente. Italy was to declare war against Germany and Austria-Hungary within a month in return for territorial concessions at the end of the war. Giolitti was initially unaware of the treaty. His aim was to get concessions from Austria-Hungary to avoid war.

While Giolitti supported neutrality, Salandra and Sonnino, supported intervention on the side of the Allies, and secured Italy's entrance into the war due to Radiosomaggismo, a series of popular demonstrations in a number of Italian cities in May 1915 demanding the country's entry into the war, despite the opposition of the majority in Parliament. On 3 May 1915, Italy officially revoked the Triple Alliance. In the following days, Giolitti and the neutralist majority of Parliament opposed declaring war, while nationalist crowds demonstrated in public areas for entering the war. On 13 May 1915, Salandra offered his resignation, but Giolitti, fearful of nationalist disorder that might break into open rebellion, declined to succeed him as prime minister and Salandra's resignation was not accepted. On 23 May 1915, Italy declared war on Austria-Hungary. On 18 May 1915, Giolitti retired to Cavour, Piedmont, and kept aloof from politics for the duration of the conflict. He consequently lost his influence over public opinion, and in many quarters was regarded as little better than a traitor.

== Fifth term as prime minister, 1920–1921 ==
Giolitti returned to politics after the end of the conflict for a fifth and final government. In the lead-up to the 1919 Italian general election, he charged that an aggressive minority had dragged Italy into war against the will of the majority, putting him at odds with the growing fascist movement. This election was the first one to be held with a proportional representation system, which was introduced by the government of Francesco Saverio Nitti.

=== Social policy ===
The fifth Giolitti government made a series of social reforms. In October 1920, a decree was issued providing guaranteed tenure to illegal land occupiers. In January 1921, a bill was introduced guaranteeing (until the end of 1922) all jobs in the agricultural sector.

=== Red Biennium ===
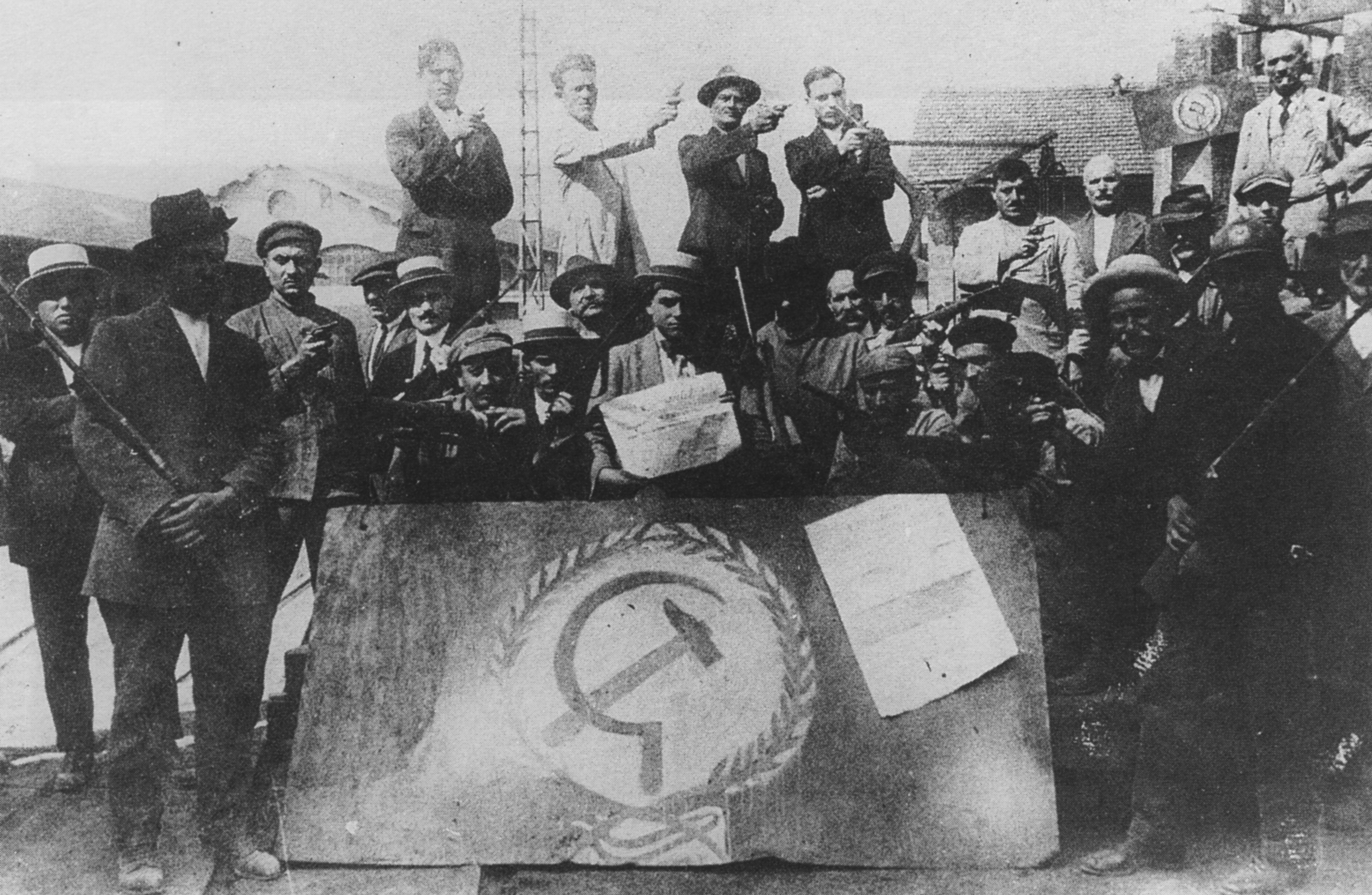
A factory manned by the Red Guards in 1920 during the Biennio Rosso

The election took place in the middle of Biennio Rosso ("Red Biennium") a two-year period, between 1919 and 1920, of intense social conflict in Italy, following the war. The revolutionary period was followed by the violent reaction of the Blackshirts militia and eventually by the March on Rome of Benito Mussolini in 1922. The Biennio Rosso took place in the context of an economic crisis at the end of the war, with high unemployment and political instability. It was characterized by mass strikes, worker manifestations as well as self-management experiments through land and factory occupations.

In Turin and Milan, workers councils were formed and many factory occupations took place under the leadership of anarcho-syndicalists. The agitations also extended to the agricultural areas of the Padan plain and were accompanied by peasant strikes, rural unrests and guerrilla conflicts between left-wing and right-wing militias. In the general election, the fragmented Liberal governing coalition lost the absolute majority in the Chamber of Deputies due to the success of the PSI and the PPI.

Giolitti became prime minister again on 15 June 1920 because he was considered the only one who could solve that dramatic situation. As he did before, he did not accept the demands of landowners and entrepreneurs asking the government to intervene by force. To the complaints of Giovanni Agnelli, who intentionally described a dramatic and exaggerated situation of FIAT, which was occupied by workers, Giolitti replied, "Very well, I will give orders to the artillery to bomb it", and after a few days the workers spontaneously ceased the strike. Giolitti was aware that an act of force would have only aggravated the situation and also suspected that in many cases the entrepreneurs were linked to the occupation of factories by workers. Giolitti succeeded in forming a cabinet which comprised a number of non-Giolittians of all parties, but only a few of his own old guard, so that he won the support of a considerable part of Parliament, although the PSI and the PPI rendered his hold somewhat precarious.

=== Fiume exploit ===
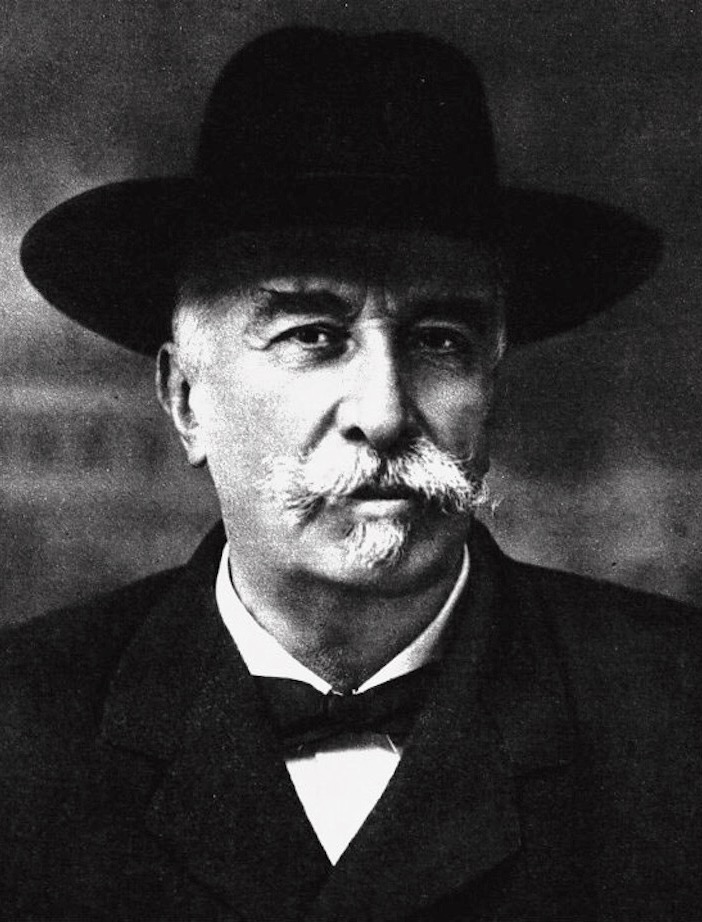
Giolitti in the 1910s

Before entering the war, Italy had made a pact with the Allies, the Treaty of London, in which it was promised all of the Austrian Littoral but not the city of Fiume. After the war, at the Paris Peace Conference in 1919, this delineation of territory was confirmed, with Fiume remaining outside of Italian borders, instead joined with adjacent Croatian territories into the Kingdom of Serbs, Croats and Slovenes. Moreover, Giolitti's last term saw Italy relinquish control over most of the Albanian territories it gained after World War I, following the Vlora War, which saw prolonged combat against Albanian irregulars in Vlorë. The Italian nationalist and poet Gabriele D'Annunzio was angered by what he considered to be the handing over of the city of Fiume. On 12 September 1919, he led around 2,600 troops from the Royal Italian Army (the Granatieri di Sardegna), Italian nationalists and irredentists, into a seizure of the city, forcing the withdrawal of the inter-Allied (American, British and French) occupying forces. Their march from Ronchi dei Legionari to Fiume became known as the Impresa di Fiume ("Fiume Exploit"). On the same day, D'Annunzio announced that he had annexed the territory to the Kingdom of Italy. He was enthusiastically welcomed by the Italian population of Fiume.

The Italian government of Giolitti opposed this move. In turn, D'Annunzio resisted pressure from Italy. The plotters sought to have Italy annexe Fiume but were denied. Instead, Italy initiated a blockade of Fiume while demanding that the plotters surrender. The approval of the Treaty of Rapallo on 12 November 1920, between Italy and Yugoslavia, turned Fiume into an independent state, the Free State of Fiume. D'Annunzio ignored the Treaty of Rapallo and declared war on Italy itself. On 24 December 1920, Giolitti sent the Italian Royal Army to Fiume and ordered the Regia Marina to bombard the city; these forced the Fiuman legionnaires to evacuate and surrender the city. The Free State of Fiume would officially last until 1924, when Fiume was eventually annexed to the Kingdom of Italy under the terms of the Treaty of Rome. The administrative division was called the Province of Fiume.

=== 1921 election and resignation ===
When workers' occupation of factories increased the fear of a communist takeover and led the political establishment to tolerate the rise of the fascists of Benito Mussolini, Giolitti enjoyed the support of the fascist squadristi and did not try to stop their forceful takeovers of city and regional government or their violence against their political opponents. In 1921, Giolitti founded the National Blocs, an electoral list composed by the Liberals, the Italian Fasces of Combat led by Mussolini, the Italian Nationalist Association led by Enrico Corradini, and other right-wing forces. Giolitti's aim was to stop the growth of the PSI. Giolitti called for new elections in May 1921; however, his list obtained only 19.1% of votes and a total of 105 MPs. The disappointing results of the 1921 Italian general election forced him to step down.

== Rise of fascism in Italy ==
Benito Mussolini and the Fascist Blackshirts during the March on Rome

Still the head of the liberals, Giolitti did not resist the country's drift towards Italian Fascism. In 1921, he supported the cabinet of Ivanoe Bonomi, a right-wing socialist who led the Italian Reformist Socialist Party; when Bonomi resigned, the Liberals proposed again Giolitti as prime minister, considering him the only one who could save the country from civil war. The PPI of Don Luigi Sturzo, which was the senior party in the coalition, strongly opposed him. On 26 February 1922, King Victor Emmanuel III gave Luigi Facta the task of forming a new cabinet. Facta was a Liberal and close friend of Giolitti. When the Italian fascist leader Benito Mussolini marched on Rome in October 1922, Giolitti was in Cavour. On 26 October, former prime minister Antonio Salandra warned the then prime minister Facta that Mussolini was demanding his resignation and that he was preparing to march on Rome; however, Facta did not believe Salandra and thought that Mussolini would govern quietly at his side. To meet the threat posed by the bands of Fascist troops gathering outside Rome, Facta, who had resigned but continued to hold power, ordered a state of siege for Rome. Having had previous conversations with the king about the repression of fascist violence, he was sure the King would agree; however, Victor Emmanuel III refused to sign the military order. On 28 October, the King handed power to Mussolini, who was supported by the military, the business class, and the right wing.

Mussolini pretended to be willing to take a subalternate ministry in a Giolitti or Salandra cabinet but then demanded to be appointed prime minister. Giolitti supported Mussolini's government initially – accepting and voting in favour of the controversial Acerbo Law, which guaranteed that a party obtaining at least 25 per cent and the largest share of the votes would gain two-thirds of the seats in Parliament. He shared the widespread hope that the fascists would become a more moderate and responsible party upon taking power, but withdrew his support in 1924, voting against the law that restricted press freedom. During a speech in the Chamber of Deputies, Giolitti said to Mussolini: "For the love of your country, do not treat the Italian people as if they did not deserve the freedom they always had in the past!" In December 1925, the provincial council of Cuneo, in which Giolitti was re-elected president in August, voted a motion which asked him to join the PNF. Giolitti, who by that time was completely opposed to the regime, resigned from his office. In 1928, he spoke to the Chamber of Deputies against the law that effectively abolished the elections, replacing them with the ratification of governmental appointments.

== Death and legacy ==
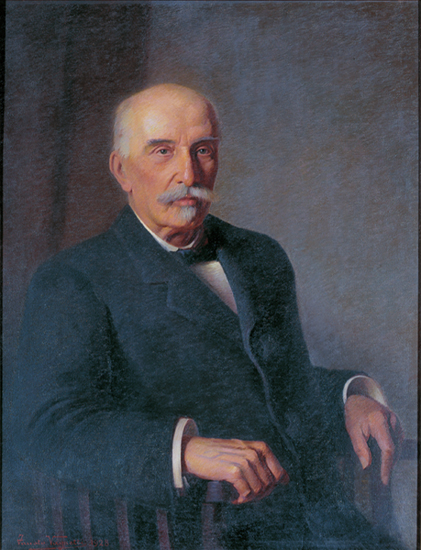
Portrait of Giolitti in 1928

Powerless, Giolitti remained in Parliament until his death in Cavour, Piedmont, on 17 July 1928. His last words to the priest were: "My dear father, I am old, very old. I served in five governments, I could not sing Giovinezza." Giovinezza, which means "youth", was the official anthem of the Fascist regime. According to his biographer Alexander De Grand, Giolitti was Italy's most notable prime minister after Camillo Benso, Count of Cavour. Like Cavour, Giolitti came from Piedmont; like other leading Piedmontese politicians, he combined Realpolitik with an Enlightenment faith in progress through material advancement. An able bureaucrat, he had little sympathy for the idealism that had inspired much of the Risorgimento. He tended to see discontent as rooted in frustrated self-interest and believed that most opponents had their price and could be transformed eventually into allies.

The primary objective of Giolittian politics was to govern from the political centre with slight and well-controlled fluctuations, now in a conservative direction, then in a progressive one, trying to preserve the institutions and the existing social order. Critics from the political right considered him a socialist due to the courting of PSI votes in Parliament in exchange for political favours; writing for the Corriere della Sera, Luigi Albertini mockingly described Giolitti as "the Bolshevik from the Most Holy Annunciation" after his Dronero speech advocating Italy's neutrality during World War I like the PSI. Critics from the political left called him ministro della malavita ("Minister of the Underworld"), a term coined by the historian Gaetano Salvemini, accusing him of winning elections with the support of criminals. According to one study, Giolitti represented a new kind of liberalism.

Giolitti's ability to muster the votes in the Chamber for the reforms he deemed necessary established him as the undisputed political leader of Italy for over a decade. His program of reforms also made him the most significant Italian practitioner of European New Liberalism. Giolitti did not contribute theoretical works to this new intellectual current, but he put into practice several of the tenets of New Liberalism before some of the theorists of the intellectual current had shown awareness of them.

Giolitti stood out as one of the major liberal reformers of late 19th- and early 20th-century Europe alongside the French Georges Clemenceau of the Independent Radicals and the British David Lloyd George of the Liberal Party. He was a staunch adherent of 19th-century elitist liberalism trying to navigate the new tide of mass politics. A lifelong bureaucrat aloof from the electorate, Giolitti introduced near universal male suffrage and tolerated labour strikes. Rather than reform the state as a concession to populism, he sought to accommodate the emancipatory groups, first in his pursuit of coalitions with socialist and Catholic movements, and at the end of his political life in a failed courtship with Italian fascism. Antonio Giolitti, the post-war left-wing politician, was his grandson.

== Giolittian Era ==
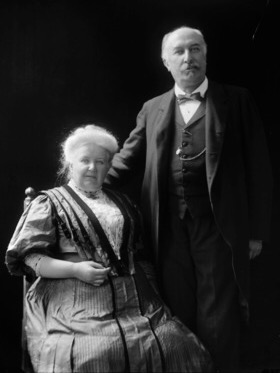
An official portrait of Giolitti with his wife Rosa Sobrero

Giolitti's policy of never interfering in strikes and leaving even violent demonstrations undisturbed at first proved successful, but indiscipline and disorder grew to such a pitch that Zanardelli, already in bad health, resigned, and Giolitti succeeded him as prime minister in November 1903. Giolitti's prominent role in the years from the start of the 20th century until 1914 is known as the Giolittian Era, in which Italy experienced an industrial expansion, the rise of organised labour and the emergence of an active Catholic political movement.

The economic expansion was secured by monetary stability, moderate protectionism and government support of production. Foreign trade doubled between 1900 and 1910, wages rose, and the general standard of living went up. Nevertheless, the period was also marked by social dislocations. There was a sharp increase in the frequency and duration of industrial action, with major labour strikes in 1904, 1906, and 1908.

Emigration reached unprecedented levels between 1900 and 1914 and rapid industrialization of the North widened the socio-economic gap with the South. Giolitti was able to get parliamentary support wherever it was possible and from whoever was willing to cooperate with him, including socialists and Catholics, who had been excluded from government before. Although an anti-clerical he got the support of the catholic deputies repaying them by holding back a divorce bill and appointing some to influential positions.

Giolitti was the first long-term prime minister of Italy in many years because he mastered the political concept of trasformismo by manipulating, coercing, and bribing officials to his side. In elections during Giolitti's government, voting fraud was common, and Giolitti helped improve voting only in well-off more supportive areas, while attempting to isolate and intimidate poor areas where opposition was strong. Many critics accused Giolitti of manipulating the elections, piling up majorities with the restricted suffrage at the time, using the prefects just as his contenders; however, he refined the practice in the general elections of 1904 and 1909 that gave the Liberals secure majorities. More positively, the Giolittian Era was characterized by a great deal of progressive social and economic reform. As one study has noted:

The liberal-labour coalition that dominated the Chamber was able to enact an impressive array of social reforms intended to improve the conditions of workers during these years. Legislation that created night schools and public libraries (to reduce illiteracy), and enforced a weekly day of rest and business closings on holidays, a strengthened workmen's compensation fund, a program of low-cost workmen's homes, a maternity insurance scheme, more generous public relief, and restrictions on female and child labor all were products of this coalition.

== See also ==
- Liberalism and radicalism in Italy
- List of prime ministers of Italy by time in office

== Bibliography ==
- Amoore, Louise (ed.) (2005). The Global Resistance Reader, Routledge, ISBN 0-415-33584-1
- Barański, Zygmunt G. & Rebecca J. West (2001). The Cambridge Companion to Modern Italian Culture, Cambridge: Cambridge University Press, ISBN 0-521-55034-3
- Clark, Martin (2008). Modern Italy: 1871 to the Present, Harlow: Pearson Education, ISBN 1-4058-2352-6
- Coppa, Frank J. (1970). "Economic and Ethical Liberalism in Conflict: The extraordinary liberalism of Giovanni Giolitti," Journal of Modern History (1970) 42#2 pp 191–215 in JSTOR
- Coppa, Frank J. (1967) "Giolitti and the Gentiloni Pact between Myth and Reality," Catholic Historical Review (1967) 53#2 pp. 217–228 in JSTOR
- Coppa, Frank J. (1971). Planning, Protectionism, and Politics in Liberal Italy: Economics and Politics in the Giolittian Age. Archived from the original on 24 June 2013 – via Questia.
- De Grand, Alexander J. (2001). The Hunchback's Tailor: Giovanni Giolitti and Liberal Italy From the Challenge of Mass Politics to the Rise of Fascism, 1882-1922, Wesport/London: Praeger, ISBN 0-275-96874-X online edition
- Duggan, Christopher (2008). The Force of Destiny: A History of Italy Since 1796, Houghton Mifflin Harcourt, ISBN 0-618-35367-4
- Killinger, Charles L. (2002). The History of Italy, Westport (CT): Greenwood Press, ISBN 0-313-31483-7
- Mack Smith, Denis (1997). Modern Italy: A Political History, Ann Arbor (MI): Univ. of Michigan Press, ISBN 978-0-472-10895-4
- Pohl, Manfred; Freitag, Sabine (European Association for Banking History) (1994). Handbook on the History of European Banks, Aldershot: Edward Elgar Publishing, ISBN 1-85278-919-0
- Salomone, A. William, Italy in the Giolittian Era: Italian Democracy in the Making, 1900-1914 (1945)
- Sarti, Roland (2004). Italy: a Reference Guide From the Renaissance to the Present, New York: Facts on File Inc., ISBN 0-81607-474-7
- Seton-Watson, Christopher (1967). Italy From Liberalism to Fascism, 1870-1925, New York: Taylor & Francis, 1967 ISBN 0-416-18940-7

Political offices
Preceded by Marchese di Rudinì	Prime Minister of Italy; 1892–1893	Succeeded by Francesco Crispi
Preceded by Giuseppe Zanardelli	Prime Minister of Italy; 1903–1905	Succeeded by Tommaso Tittoni
Preceded by Sidney Sonnino	Prime Minister of Italy; 1906–1909	Succeeded by Sidney Sonnino
Preceded by Luigi Luzzatti	Prime Minister of Italy; 1911–1914	Succeeded by Antonio Salandra
Preceded by Francesco Saverio Nitti	Prime Minister of Italy; 1920–1921	Succeeded by Ivanoe Bonomi
