= Opera dei Congressi =

The Opera dei Congressi or Work of the Congress was a Roman Catholic organisation that promoted Catholic ideas and culture. It was created in 1874, and observed the positions of the Catholic Church, in particular Non Expedit. It began as a non-political group but moved into protesting the imprisonment in the Vatican of the Pope. It fought against anticlerical legislation and the many divorce bills that were introduced by successive liberal governments (1861–1922).

It was organised in a hierarchical way, with headquarters at local, regional and diocesan levels. After 1880, it had a surge in popularity and promoted economic and social activity with farm loan banks, mutual aid societies, and cooperatives. Its influence was at its height in 1897, but it was temporarily disbanded in 1898 after being blamed for widespread bread riots.

It was dissolved in 1904 by Pope Pius X.
