= Ottorino Gentiloni =

Italian politician

His Excellency Ottorino Gentiloni
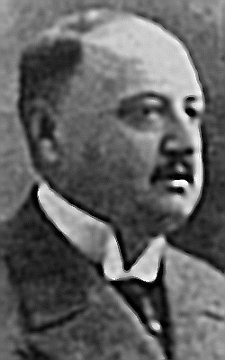

Personal details
- Born: October 13, 1865 Filottrano, Kingdom of Sardinia
- Died: August 2, 1916 (aged 50) Rome, Kingdom of Italy
- Party: Catholic Electoral Union

Count Vincenzo Ottorino Gentiloni (13 October 1865 – 2 August 1916) was an Italian politician, one of the early leaders of the Italian Catholic Azione Cattolica movement. He was born near Ancona, was active in Catholic politics from the 1890s, and served as president of the Catholic Electoral Union from 1909 to 1916.

When the Pope lifted the ban on Catholic participation in politics in 1913, and the electorate was expanded, he collaborated with Prime Minister Giovanni Giolitti in the Gentiloni pact. It directed Catholic voters to Giolitti supporters who agreed to favor the Church's position on such key issues as funding private Catholic schools, and blocking a law allowing divorce. Radicals and Socialist condemned the alliance, and brought down Giolitti's coalition in 1914.

Gentiloni died in 1916, due to epidemic typhus, contracted during the World War I.
