= 1916 in Italy =

- Decades: 1890s; 1900s; 1910s; 1920s; 1930s
- See also: History of Italy; Timeline of Italian history; List of years in Italy

The following events occurred in Italy in the year 1916.

== Kingdom of Italy ==
- Monarch – Victor Emmanuel III (1900–1946)
- Prime Minister –
  1. Antonio Salandra (1914–1916)
  2. Paolo Boselli (1916–1917)
- Population – 36,481,000

== Events ==
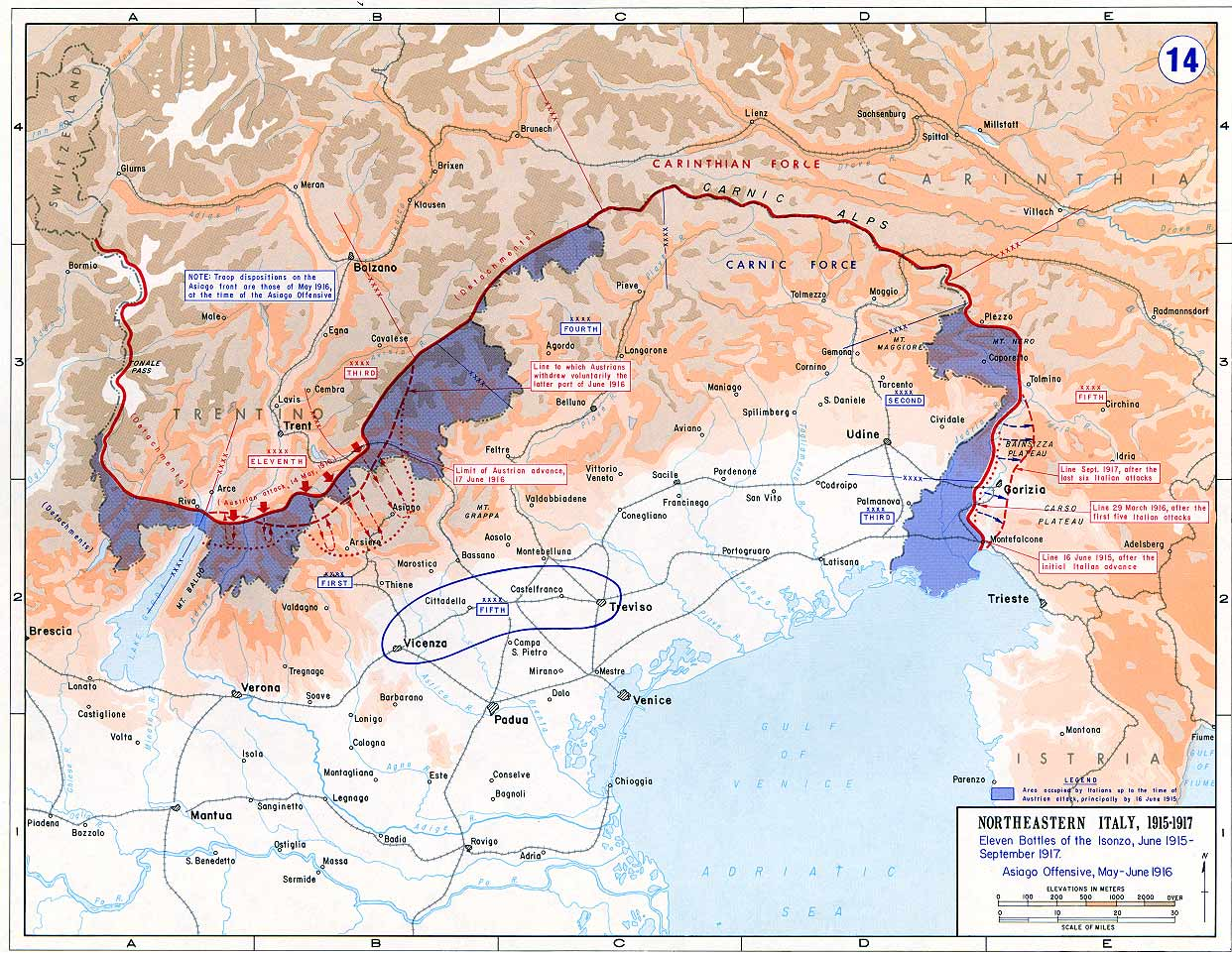
The Italian Front in 1915–1917: eleven Battles of the Isonzo and Asiago offensive. In blue, initial Italian conquests

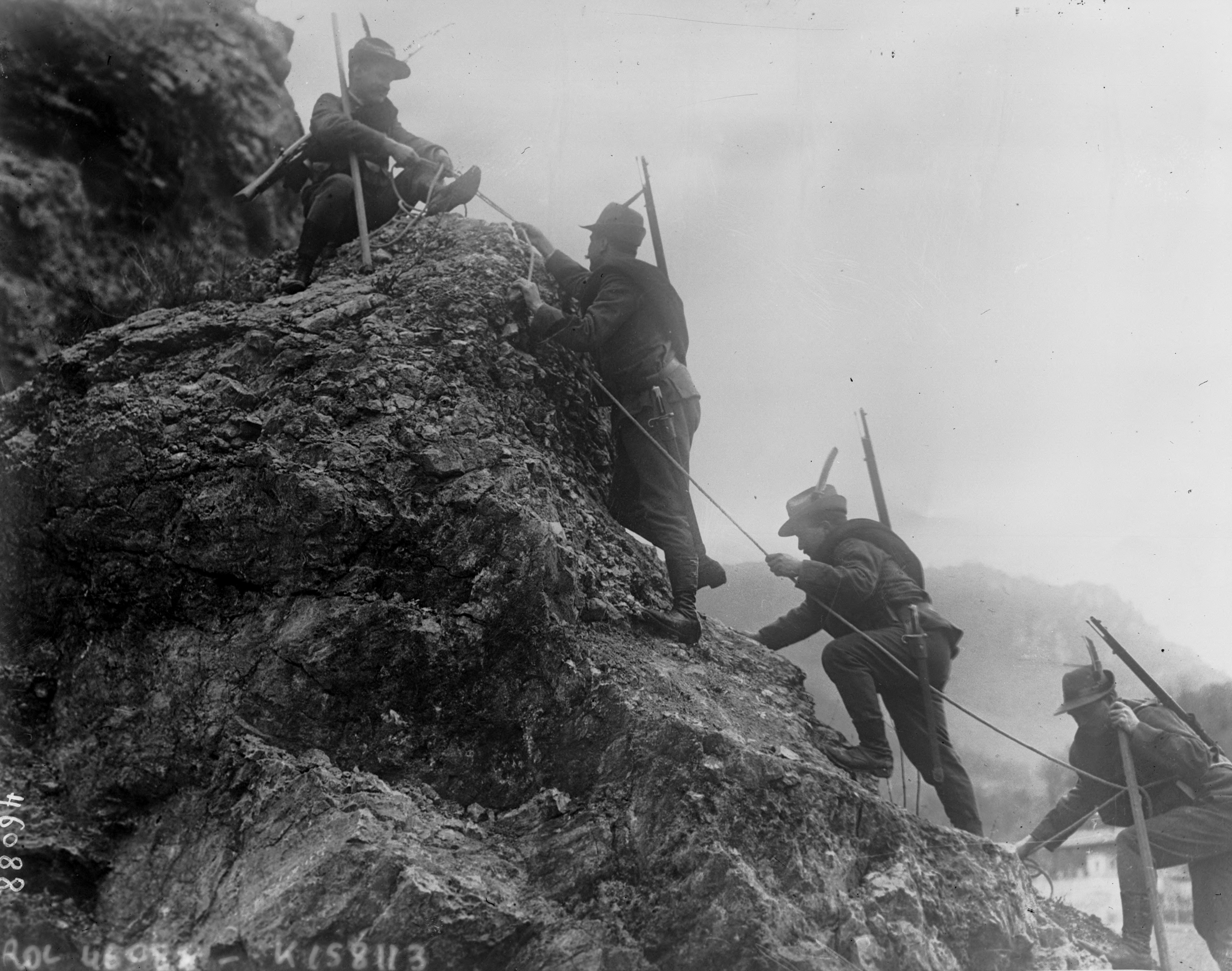
Italian Alpini troops; 1915

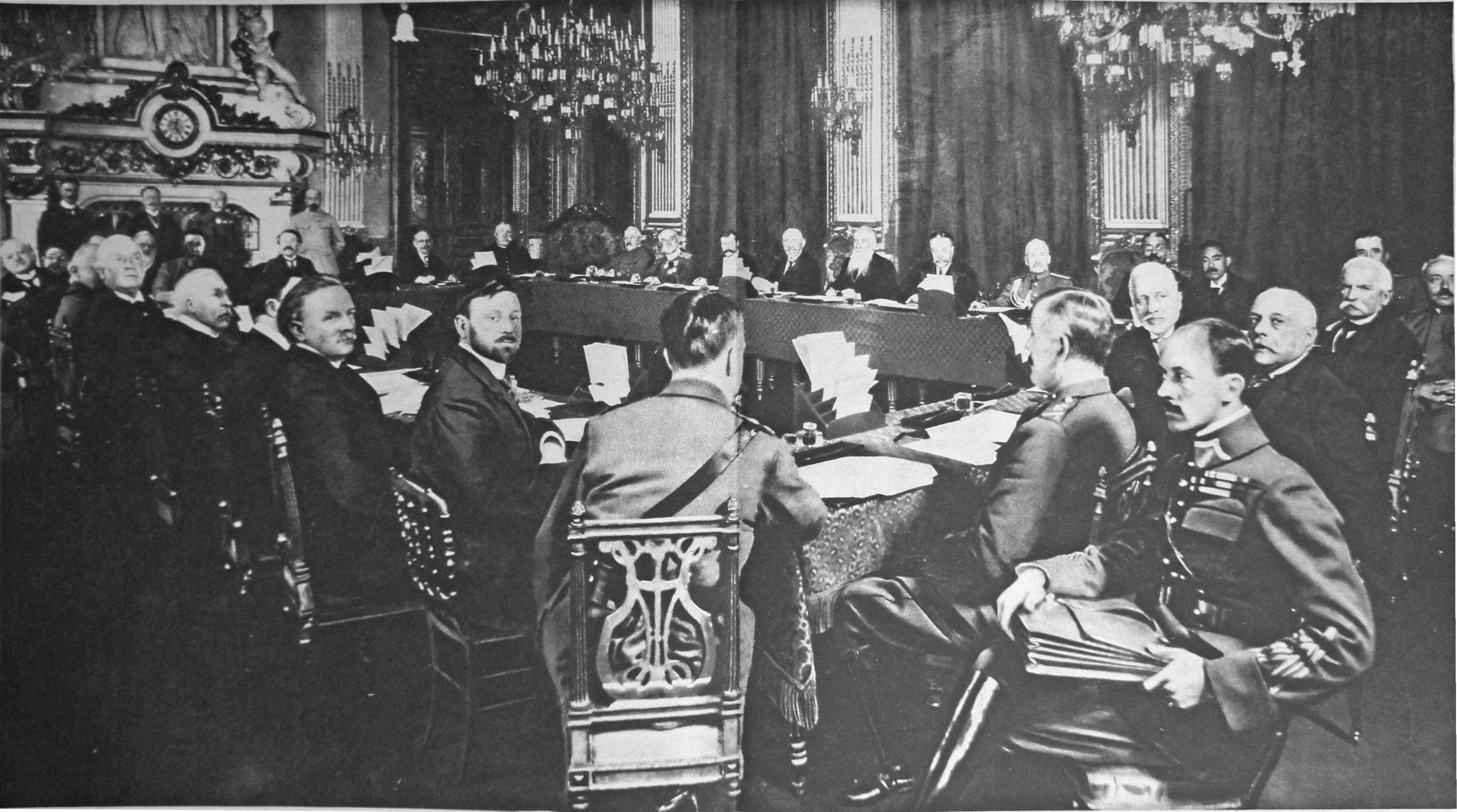
Prime Minister Antonio Salandra, Field Marshal Luigi Cadorna and ambassador Tommaso Tittoni at a conference of the Allied Powers on 27–28 March 1916 in Paris

Italy entered World War I in May 1915, declaring war on Austria-Hungary. The Royal Italian Army stands under command of Chief of Staff and Field Marshal Luigi Cadorna. The Isonzo is the main battlefield on the Italian Front. The goal of these offensives was the fortress of Gorizia, the capture of which would permit the Italian armies to pivot south and march on Trieste. The frequency of offensives, one every three months, was higher than demanded by the armies on the Western Front. Italian discipline was also harsher, with punishments for infractions of duty of a severity not known in the German, French, and British armies.

=== February ===
- February 14 – First bombing of Milan. Two Austrian planes drop bombs on Porta Romana and Porta Volta.

=== March ===
- March 9–15 – After the winter lull, the Italians launch the Fifth Battle of the Isonzo, but Austrian-Hungarian troops repulse the offensive, and the battle concludes in poor weather for trench warfare.

=== May ===
- May 15 – June 10 – Battle of Asiago. Following the stalemate, the Austrian forces begin planning a counteroffensive in Trentino and directed over the plateau of Altopiano di Asiago, with the aim to break through to the Po River plain and thus cutting off the Italian Armies in the North East of the country. The offensive results in no gain.

=== June ===
- June 11 – Due to the aftermath of the Battle of Asiago, Prime Minister Antonio Salandra resigns.
- June 18 – Paolo Boselli forms a new Cabinet. The new government has the character of a government of national unity and consists of nineteen ministers, representative of all political groups. Vittorio Emanuele Orlando becomes Minister of the Interior, while Sidney Sonnino remains Foreign Minister.

=== July ===
- July 12 – Cesare Battisti and Fabio Filzi, both Austrian subjects but exponents of Trentino irredentism are hanged by the Austrians in Trento. They had enlisted in the Italian army and were captured by the Austrians, who condemned them as deserters.

=== August ===
- August 6–17 – The Battle of Doberdò and the Sixth Battle of the Isonzo, both launched by the Italians, result in a success greater than the previous attacks. The offensive gains nothing of strategic value but did take Gorizia, which boosts Italian spirits.
- August 28 – Italy declares war on Germany.

=== September ===
- September 14–17 – Seventh Battle of the Isonzo. The Italians try to extend their hold of their newly-won Gorizia bridgehead in attacks to the south-east of the town. Despite the greater concentration of resources upon a single point – intended to reduce the severely high casualty rate sustained to date – the attack was called off after three days of heavy casualties.

=== October ===
- October 5 – The Italian Government is informed of the content of the agreement signed in May between France, England and Russia for the partition of the Asian part of the Ottoman Empire. Italy advances reservations about these agreements and demands that part of Asia Minor including the Turkish provinces of Aidin (Smyrna), Konya and Adana, would be allocated to Italy as agreed in the 1915 Treaty of London.
- October 10–12 – Eighth Battle of the Isonzo. The attack is essentially a continuation of attempts made during the previous Seventh Battle of the Isonzo to extend the bridgehead established at Gorizia during the Sixth Battle of the Isonzo in August 1916. Heavy Italian casualties require that the initiative is called off pending the army's recuperation.

=== November ===
- November 1–4 – Ninth Battle of the Isonzo is called off in failure, and the Italians, weakened by continual offensive operations throughout the year – 1916 had seen five Isonzo operations on top of four undertaken the year before – take a lengthy break for the winter.

=== December ===
- December 13 – "White Friday", 10,000 Austrian and Italian soldiers are killed by avalanches in the Dolomites. According to some reports both sides deliberately fired shells into the weakened snowpacks in an attempt to bury the other side.

== Births ==
- January 1
  - Giuseppe Aquari, Italian cinematographer (d. 1982)
  - Italo Viglianesi, Italian trade unionist and syndicalist (d. 1995)
- January 24 – Arnoldo Foà, Italian actor (d. 2014)
- March 2 – George E. Bria, Italian-born American journalist (d. 2014)
- March 4 – Giorgio Bassani, Italian writer (d. 2000)
- March 24 – Anna Maria Bottini, Italian actress (d. 2020)
- April 1 – Balilla Lombardi, Italian footballer (d. 1987)
- April 19 – Bruno Chizzo, Italian footballer (d. 1969)
- April 28 – Ferruccio Lamborghini, Italian automobile manufacturer (d. 1993)
- May 20 – Trebisonda Valla, Italian athlete (d. 2006)
- July 14 – Natalia Ginzburg, Italian author (d. 1991)
- July 20 – Ersilio Tonini, Italian cardinal (d. 2013)
- August 1 – Olimpio Bizzi, Italian racing cyclist (d. 1976)
- September 23 – Aldo Moro, Prime Minister of Italy (d. 1978)
- September 27 – Trento Longaretti, Italian painter (d. 2017)

== Deaths ==
- April 20 – Claudio Casanova, Italian professional football player who died from the injuries he suffered at front in World War I (b. 1895)
- August 6 – Enrico Toti, Italian one-legged cyclist killed in the Sixth Battle of the Isonzo (b. 1882)
- August 10 – Giuseppe Sinigaglia, Italian rower, killed in the Sixth Battle of the Isonzo (b. 1884)
- August 17 – Umberto Boccioni, influential Italian painter and sculptor that helped shape the revolutionary aesthetic of the Futurism movement (b. 1882)
- October 10 – Antonio Sant'Elia, Italian architect and a key member of the Futurist movement in architecture, killed during the Eighth Battle of the Isonzo (b. 1888)
