= 1917 in Italy =

- Decades: 1890s; 1900s; 1910s; 1920s; 1930s
- See also: History of Italy; Timeline of Italian history; List of years in Italy

Events from the year 1917 in Italy.

== Kingdom of Italy ==
- Monarch – Victor Emmanuel III (1900–1946)
- Prime Minister –
  1. Paolo Boselli (1916–1917)
  2. Vittorio Emanuele Orlando (1917–1919)
- Population – 36,343,000

- Due to World War I the Italian population declined by 234,978 people

== Events ==
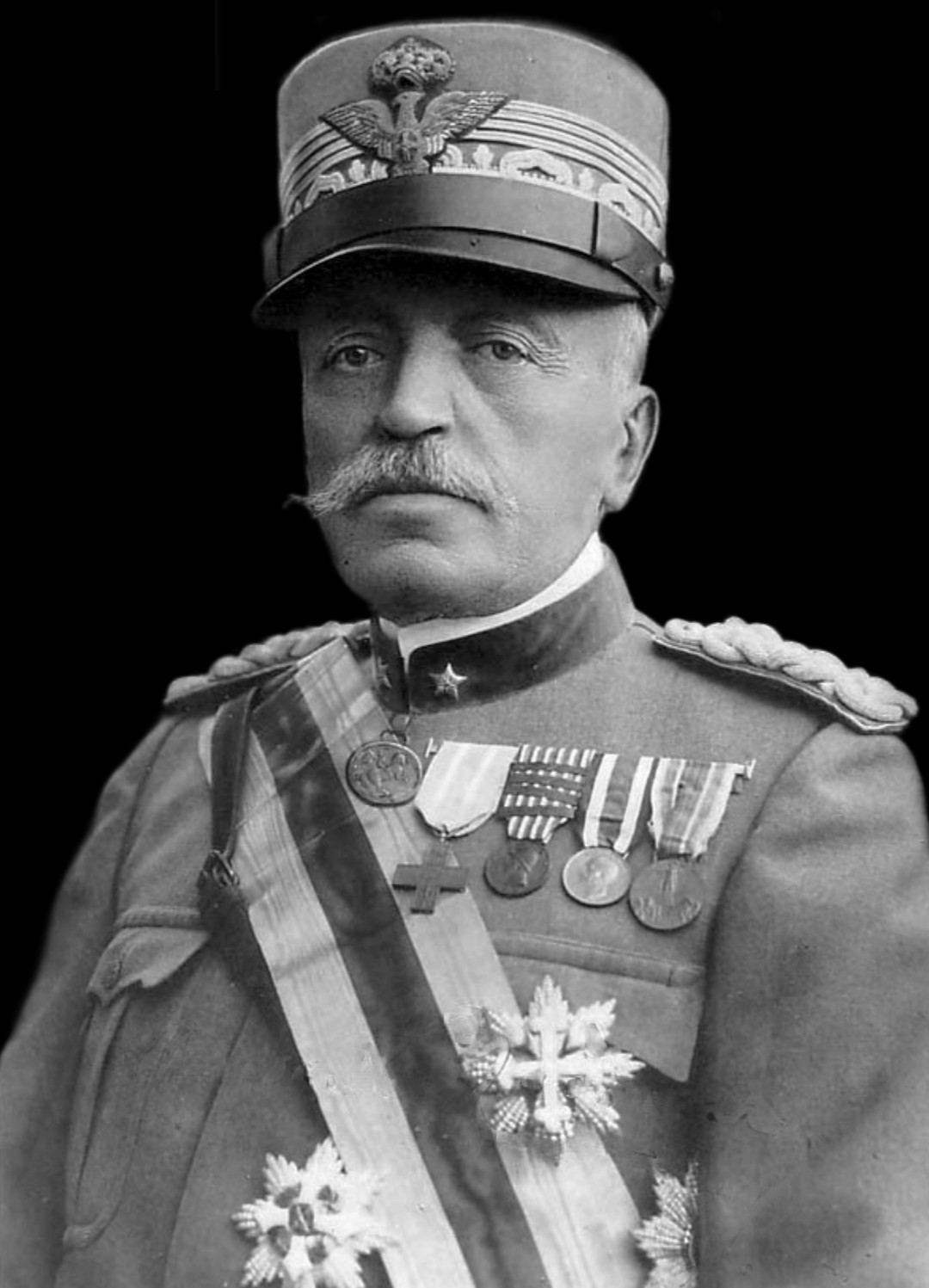
Chief of Staff, General Luigi Cadorna

Italy entered World War I in May 1915, declaring war on Austria-Hungary. In August 1916 Italy declares war on Germany. The Italian Front stands under command of Chief of Staff, General Luigi Cadorna. The Isonzo is the main battlefield.

=== February ===
- February 25 – At a national congress of the Italian Socialist Party (PSI) in Rome the division between reformists and hard-liners increases; only the approval of an agenda proposed by Costantino Lazzari manages to avoid fracture.

=== April ===
- April 26 – Agreement of St.-Jean-de-Maurienne between France, Italy and the United Kingdom, signed at Saint-Jean-de-Maurienne. Drafted by the Italian Foreign Minister Sidney Sonnino, as a tentative agreement to settle its Middle Eastern interest, the agreement was needed by the allies to secure the position of Italian forces in the Middle East and to balance the military power drops at the Middle Eastern theatre of World War I as Russian (Tsarist) forces were pulling out of the Caucasus Campaign. Italy would receive a part of southwestern Anatolia, including İzmir (Smyrna).

=== May ===
- May 1 – Riots break out in Milan and in the suburbs of the city and some other towns in Lombardy.
- May 8 – The PSI and the Italian General Confederation of Labour (CGIL), the socialist parliamentary group and the PSI sections of Milan and Turin meet in Milan. After fierce debate, a call is approved inviting organizations and individual workers to comply with "discipline" to the directives of the party and not to take "isolated and fragmented" initiatives.
- May 10 – June 8 – Tenth Battle of the Isonzo. The Italians advance to within 15 km of Trieste almost reaching the coastal town of Duino, but a major Austro-Hungarian counter-offensive launched on 3 June reclaimed virtually all lost ground and by the time the battle was called off little territory had been gained.
- May 23 – After almost a month of civil violence in Milan the Italian army forcibly takes over the city from anarchists and anti-war revolutionaries. Fifty people are killed and 800 arrested.

=== June ===
- June 10 – A proclamation of the commander of the Italian troops in Albania, General Giacinto Ferrero, promising freedom and independence of Albania under the protection of Italy, which had been approved by Foreign Minister Sidney Sonnino without consulting the Council of Ministers, provokes strong reactions on the part of ministers of the Interventionist left, the Republican Ubaldo Comandini and socialist reformists Leonida Bissolati and Ivanoe Bonomi, who present their resignation in protest to Prime Minister Paolo Boselli.
- June 10–25 – Battle of Mount Ortigara. After fierce and bloody fightings the Italian 52nd Alpine Division managed to capture the top of Mount Ortigara. The Austro-Hungarian command promptly sent many trained reinforcements which retook it, the strenuous Italian resistance notwithstanding.
- June 23 – Italy establishes an Italian protectorate over Albania in an effort to secure a de jure independent Albania under Italian control (until the summer of 1920).
- June 30 – In the Chamber of Deputies the Socialist leader Filippo Turati calls on the government to start peace negotiations.

=== August ===
- August 18 – September 12 – Eleventh Battle of the Isonzo. The offensive soon wore out. After the battle, the Austro-Hungarian army were exhausted, and could not have withstood another attack. But so were the Italians, who could not find the resources necessary for another assault, even though it might have been the decisive one. So the final result of the battle was another inconclusive bloodbath. Chief of Staff, General Luigi Cadorna warns Prime Minister Boselli of a vast work of socialist incitement in the army.
- August 21 – Insurrection for "peace and bread" in Turin. The uprising quickly turns into open rebellion against the war.

=== October ===
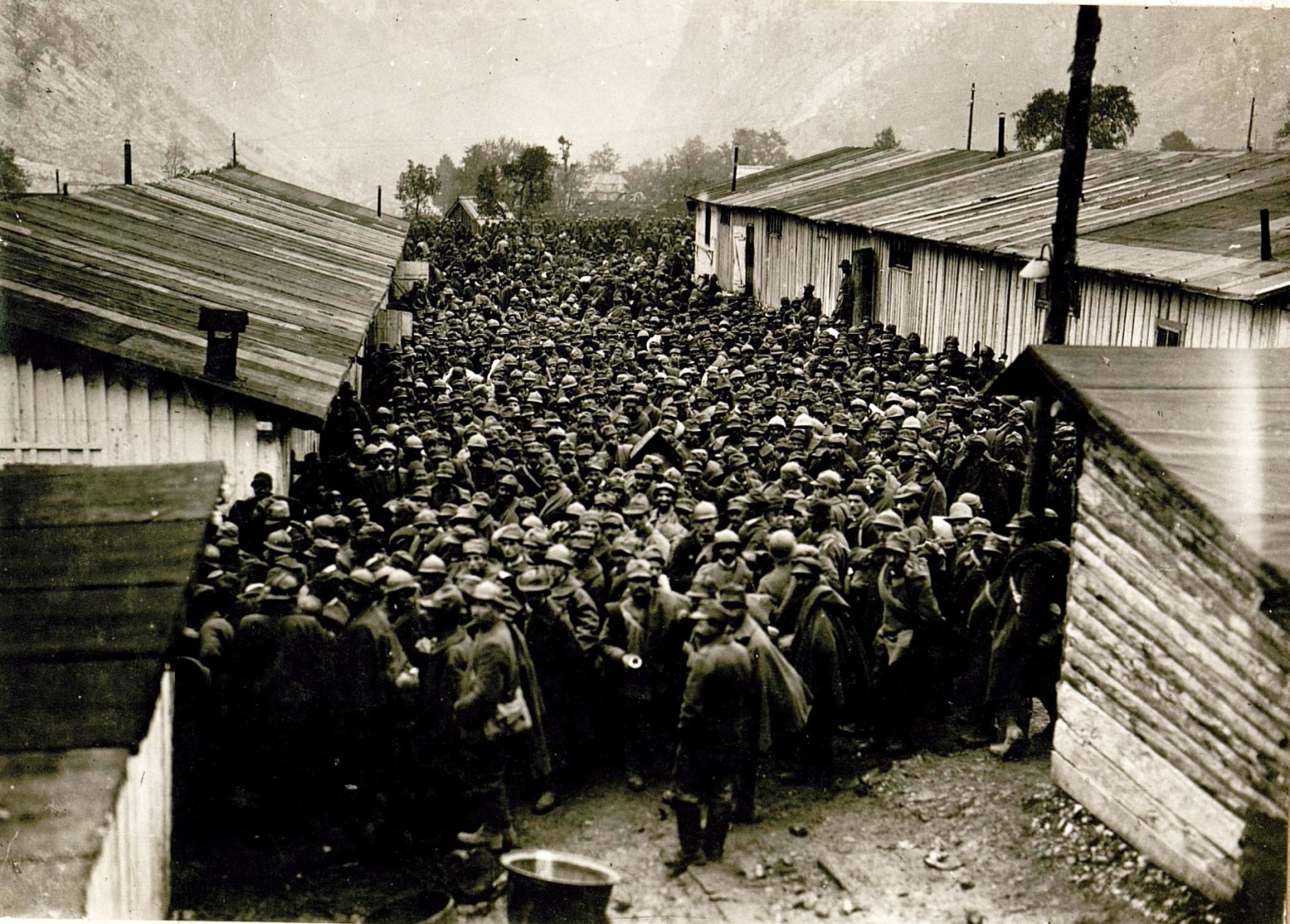
Italian POWs after the Battle of Caporetto.

- October 4 – By royal decree heavy criminal sanctions are proclaimed against anyone who commits or incites to commit acts of defeatism (The decree will be abolished on 19 November 1918).
- October 24 – November 12 – Battle of Caporetto, also known as the Twelfth Battle of the Isonzo. The Austrians received desperately needed reinforcements from German Army. The Germans introduced infiltration tactics to the Austrian front and helped work on a new offensive. Meanwhile, mutinies and plummeting morale crippled the Italian Army from within. The soldiers lived in poor conditions and engaged in attack after attack that often yielded minimal or no military gain. Austro-Hungarian forces, reinforced by German units, were able to break into the Italian front line due to the use of stormtroopers and the infiltration tactics. The use of poison gas by the Germans also played a key role in the collapse of the Italian Second Army. France and Britain send reinforcements through the Italian Expeditionary Force.
- October 26 – The Italian military disaster at Caporetto on October 25, leads to the fall of the Paolo Boselli government.
- October 30 – Vittorio Emanuele Orlando becomes Prime Minister, and continues in that role through the rest of the war. He had been a strong supporter of Italy's entry in the war and successfully leads a patriotic national front government, the Unione Sacra and reorganizes the army.

=== November ===
- November 5–7 – Rapallo Conference in Rapallo, Italy, convened by the Allied powers in the wake of the severe Italian setback at Caporetto. The conference decides to form a Supreme War Council at Versailles to co-ordinate allied plans and actions and promised fresh aid to the Italians.
- November 9 – General Luigi Cadorna was relieved of command of the Italian army. Italy's allies Britain and France sent eleven divisions to reinforce the Italian front, and insisted on his dismissal. The new Italian Prime Minister Vittorio Orlando appoints the respected General Armando Diaz as Chief of General Staff.
- November 10 – The Italian front on the Piave effectively resist the enemy offensive, despite superior resources and manpower employed by the Austro-Germans. The Germans gradually withdraw their military contingent from the Italian front in the following month to prepare for the great offensive in the spring of 1918 on the Western Front.

== Births ==
- January 5 – Adolfo Consolini, Italian discus thrower (d. 1969)
- February 6 – Sonny Franzese, Italian-born American mobster (d. 2020)
- March 12 – Giovanni Benedetti, Italian Catholic prelate (d. 2017)
- July 12 – Luigi Gorrini, Italian soldier and pilot (d. 2014)
- September 22 – Anna Campori, Italian actress (d. 2018)

== Deaths ==
- October 28 – Eugenio Elia Levi, Italian mathematician, killed in action during First World War (b. 1883)
- November 4 – Leopoldo Franchetti, Italian publicist, meridionalist and politician (b. 1847)
