= 1915 in Italy =

- Decades: 1890s; 1900s; 1910s; 1920s; 1930s
- See also: History of Italy; Timeline of Italian history; List of years in Italy

Events from the year 1915 in Italy.

== Kingdom of Italy ==
- Monarch – Victor Emmanuel III (1900–1946)
- Prime Minister – Antonio Salandra (1914–1916)
- Population – 36,271,000

== Events ==
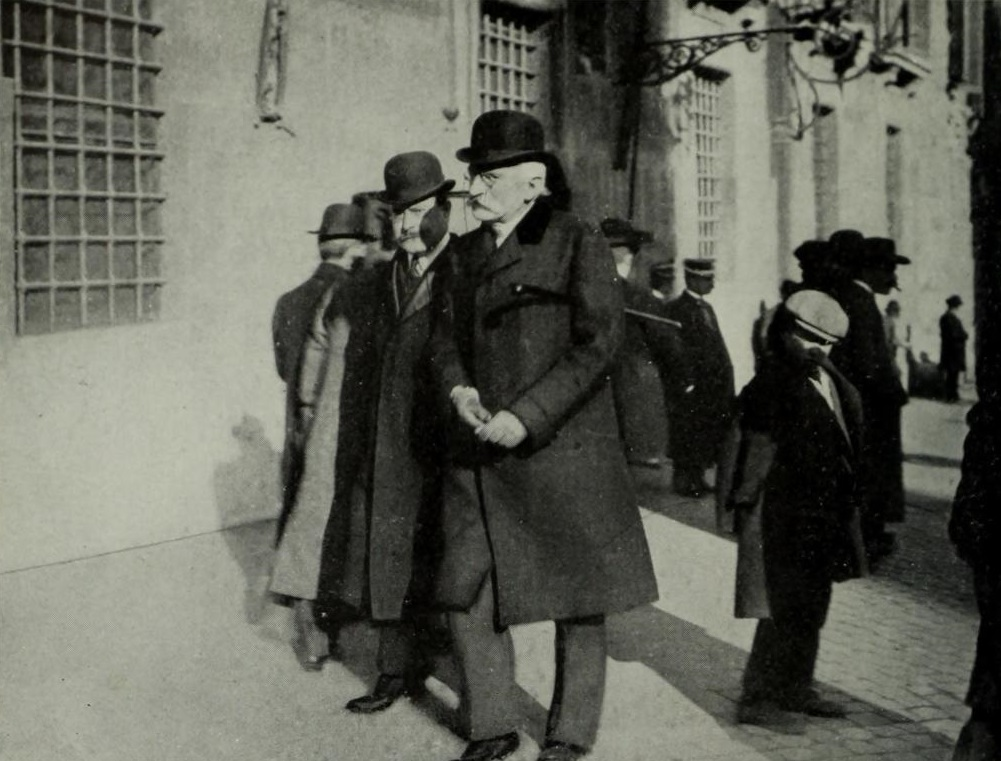
Sidney Sonnino as Foreign Minister negotiating Italy's position in the war

While World War I is raging in Europe, Italy debates its entry into the war. Originally part the Triple Alliance with Germany and Austria-Hungary, Italy secretly negotiates with the Triple Entente trying to fulfil Italy’s irredentist claims.

=== January ===
- January 13 – The 6.7 M_{w} Avezzano earthquake shakes the Province of L'Aquila in Italy with a maximum Mercalli intensity of XI (Extreme). Various agencies estimate the number of people killed to be 29,978–32,610.

=== February ===
- February 21 – Neutralist organize large events against the war in many Italian cities clashing with interventionists supported by the police.
- February 25 – The police start shooting at a rally held in Reggio Emilia by the socialist irredentist from Trentino, Cesare Battisti, demanding Italy join the Triple Entente against Austria, killing one protester and wounding others.

=== March ===
- March 4 – Italy begins negotiations with the Triple Entente. The ambassador in London hands over the Italian conditions to the British Foreign Minister Edward Grey.
- March 31 – In Milan, public forces repress a demonstration against the war called by socialist leader Giacinto Menotti Serrati, who was arrested along with other 235 people. At the same time a demonstration in favour of the intervention takes place under the direction of Filippo Corridoni and Benito Mussolini.

=== April ===
Rome, April 11, 1915: Benito Mussolini is arrested after an interventionist rally

- April 8 – Foreign Minister Sidney Sonnino sends a draft treaty in eleven articles to Austria. Among the various requests the treaty envisages the transfer to Italy of Trentino and Bolzano and the Isarco Valley and various islands along the Dalmatian coast, a shift of the Italian eastern border including Gorizia, the creation of an autonomous state of Trieste, and the waiver of all Austrian claims on Albania. In exchange, Sonnino guarantees Italian neutrality in the ongoing war. On April 16, Austria rejects the Italian demands, reiterating that it is prepared to give only part of the Trentino. Consequently, the negotiations between the two States are interrupted.
- April 26 – A secret pact, the Treaty of London or London Pact (Italian: Patto di Londra), is signed between the Triple Entente (the United Kingdom, France, and the Russian Empire) and the Kingdom of Italy. According to the pact, Italy was to leave the Triple Alliance and join the Triple Entente. Italy was to declare war against Germany and Austria-Hungary within a month in return for territorial concessions at the end of the war to fulfil Italy’s irredentist claims.

=== May ===
- May 3 – Italy officially revokes the Triple Alliance. In the following days Giovanni Giolitti and the neutralist majority of the Parliament oppose declaring war, while nationalist crowds demonstrate in public areas for entering the war.
- May 13 – Prime Minister Antonio Salandra offers his resignation, but Giolitti, fearful of nationalist disorder that might break into open rebellion, declines to succeed as prime minister and Salandra's resignation is not accepted.
- May 20 – The Chamber of Deputies passes (407 to 74) a single-article bill transferring both legislative and executive powers to the government, empowering it to do what it deemed necessary to ensure the security of the state.
- May 23 - Italy declares war on Austria-Hungary.

=== June ===
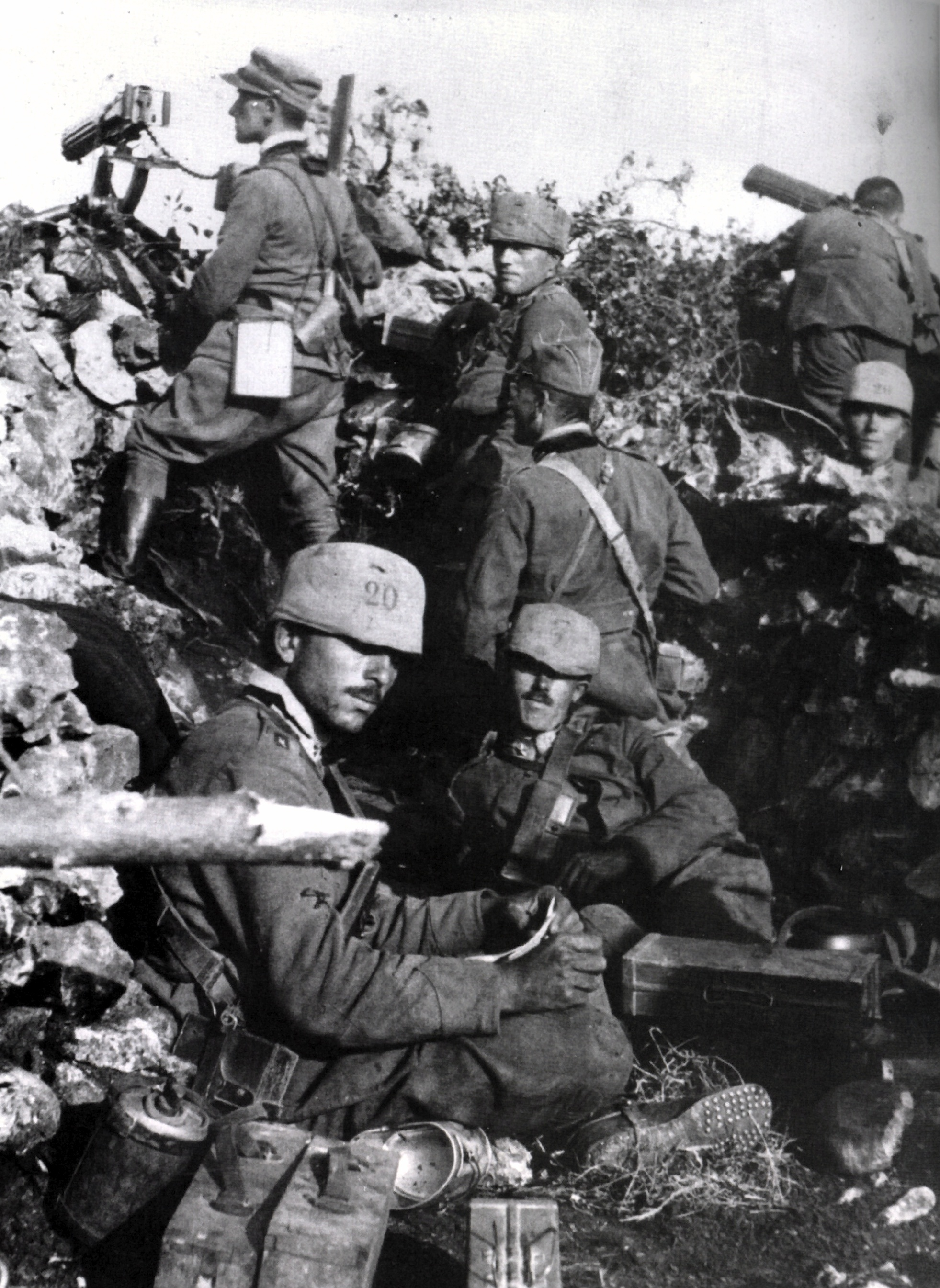
Second Battle of the Isonzo - 20th Cavalleggeri di Roma Cavalry Regiment position in the Karst Plateau.

- June 23 – July 7 – The First Battle of the Isonzo between the Armies of Italy and Austria-Hungary on the Italian Front in World War I. The aim of the Italian Army, under the command of Luigi Cadorna, was to drive the Austrians away from its defensive positions along the Soča (Isonzo) and on the nearby mountains.

=== July ===
- July 18 – August 3 – Second Battle of the Isonzo. After the failed first attempt, the Italians launch another frontal assault against the Austro-Hungarian trench lines with more artillery, but the forces of Austria-Hungary beat back this bloody offensive, which concludes in stalemate and exhaustion of weaponry.

=== September ===
- September 5–8 – The first socialist international anti-war conference is held in Zimmerwald (Switzerland). Participants for the Italian socialists include Costantino Lazzari, Giacinto Menotti Serrati, Giuseppe Emanuele Modigliani, Oddino Morgari and Angelica Balabanoff. The conference approved a manifesto condemning the war and proposes joint action for a peace without annexations and without indemnities of war, and the right to self-determination of peoples.

=== October ===
- October 18 – November 3 – Third Battle of the Isonzo. Forces of Austria-Hungary again repulse an Italian offensive, which concludes without resulting gains.
- October 19 – Italy declares war on Bulgaria.

=== November ===
- November 10 – December 2 – Fourth Battle of the Isonzo. Both sides suffer more casualties, but the Austro-Hungarian forces repulse this Italian offensive too, and the battle ends because of exhaustion of armaments.

== Sports ==
- March 28 – The Italian rider Ezio Corlaita wins the 9th Milan–San Remo bicycle race.
- November 7 – The Italian rider Gaetano Belloni wins the 11th Giro di Lombardia bicycle race.

== Births ==
- February 23 - Don Giovanni Fornasini, Gold Medal of Military Valour, Servant of God, murdered at Marzabotto by a Waffen SS soldier (d. 1944)
- March 30 – Pietro Ingrao, Italian politician, journalist and former partisan. Senior figure in the Italian Communist Party (PCI) (d. 2015)
- May 3 – Michele Cozzoli, Italian composer, conductor and arranger (d. 1961)
- May 16 – Mario Monicelli, six times-Oscar nominated Italian director and screenwriter (d. 2010)
- June 16 – Mariano Rumor, Italian politician and Prime Minister (d. 1990)
- July 3 – Marta Grandi, Italian entomologist (d. 2005)
- July 17 - Mario Del Monaco, Italian operatic tenor (d. 1982)
- September 7 – Maria Corti, Italian philologist, literary critic, and novelist (d. 2002)
- November 13 – Carla Marangoni, Italian gymnast (d. 2018)

== Deaths ==
- August 19 – Serafino Vannutelli, Italian Roman Catholic cardinal, Dean of the College of Cardinals (b. 1834)
- November 3 – Bernardino Verro, Sicilian syndicalist and politician involved in the Fasci Siciliani (Sicilian Leagues), killed by the Sicilian Mafia (b. 1866)
- December 3 – Scipio Slataper, Italian writer (b. 1888)
- December 8 – Gaetano Perusini, Italian physician, pupil and colleague of Alois Alzheimer (b. 1879)
- December 31 – Tommaso Salvini, Italian actor (b. 1829)
