= Ubaldo Comandini =

Italian lawyer, publicist and politician

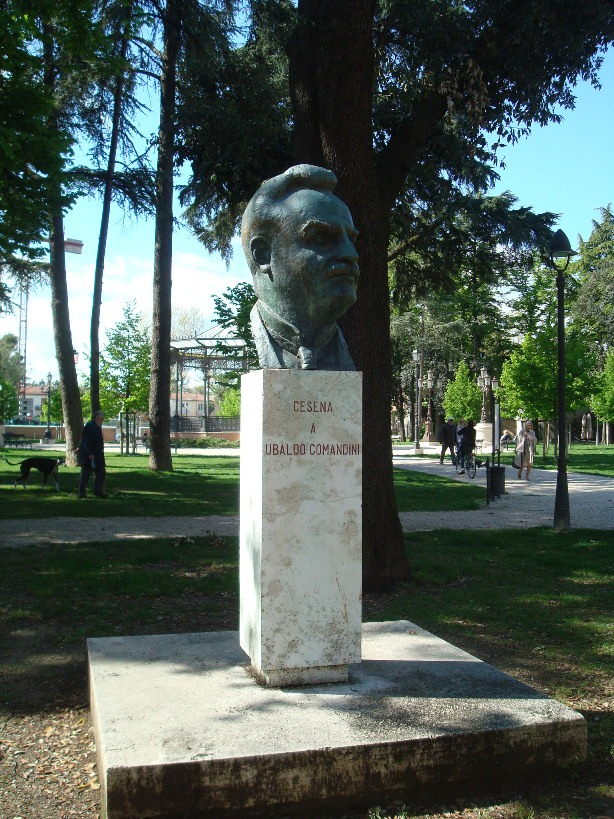
- Bust of Comandini in Cesena

Minister without portfolio
- In office June 1916 – October 1917
- Prime Minister: Paolo Boselli

General Commissioner
- In office February 1918 – April 1919
- Prime Minister: Vittorio Emanuele Orlando

Personal details
- Born: 25 March 1869 Cesena, Italy
- Died: 1 March 1925 (aged 55) Rome, Italy
- Party: Italian Republican Party

Ubaldo Comandini (Cesena, 25 March 1869 – Rome, 1 March 1925) was an Italian lawyer, publicist and politician, several times a parliamentary deputy and minister for the Italian Republican Party.

== Background an early life ==
Ubaldo Comandini was born into a family with Risorgimento traditions. His uncle, Federico Comandini (1815–1893), had participated in the revolutionary revolts in Romagna in 1831, fought in 1849 against the Austrians in defense of the Roman Republic, took part in the Mazzinian revolts in 1853 and was later arrested, tortured and sentenced to perpetual prison, before being released, in 1865.

Raised in the republican faith, Ubaldo Comandini graduated in law at the University of Bologna and devoted himself to the study of social issues; he wrote in newspapers and magazines. He was mayor of Cesena for many years as well as a provincial councilor. He was particularly interested in cultural institutes, for which his city was cited as a model.

A freemason, he was among those who founded the "Rubicone" lodge of Cesena in 1899. The documents of the lodge indicate that he certainly belonged to it until 1911. He also voted in favor of the Bissolati motion banning religious teaching in primary schools.

== Political career ==
In 1900, Comandini was elected deputy in the XXI legislature, for the constituency of Cesena, in the lists of the historic extreme left and he enrolled in the parliamentary group of the Italian Republican Party. He was elected a further three times, to the XXII, XXIII and XXIV legislatures, serving until 1921.

A convinced interventionist, he volunteered in the First World War, together with his sons Giacomo and Federico, even though he was then forty-six years old.

From June 1916 to October 1917 he was part of the Boselli Cabinet as a minister without portfolios and, from February 1918 to April 1919, he was General Commissioner in the Orlando government, dealing, in both cases, with propaganda works and war assistance.

His son Federico Comandini was also a politician.

== Works ==
- Ubaldo Comandini, Additional Notes for the Municipality of Santeramo against the Owners of Matine lands (Note aggiunte per il Comune di Santeramo contro i Possessori delle terre alle Matine), Fratelli Pansini fu S., Bari, 1909.
- Ubaldo Comandini, The school problem in Italy. Primary and popular education (Il problema della scuola in Italia. Istruzione primaria e popolare), Bontempelli and Invernizzi editors, Rome, 1912.
- Ubaldo Comandini, Ecclesiastical politics and school politics (Ubaldo Comandini, Politica ecclesiastica e politica scolastica), Bontempelli and Invernizzi, Rome, 1913.
- Ubaldo Comandini, The problem of the school (Il problema della scuola), Unione editruce, Rome, 1914.
- Ubaldo Comandini, The new Italy to the new France (La nouvelle Italie à la nouvelle France, Comité parisien de la Dante Alighieri, Paris, 1916.
- Ubaldo Comandini, The enemy effort must fail (Lo sforzo nemico deve fallire), Tip. cartiere centrali, Rome, 1917.
