= 1914 in Italy =

- Decades: 1890s; 1900s; 1910s; 1920s; 1930s
- See also: History of Italy; Timeline of Italian history; List of years in Italy

Events from the year 1914 in Italy.

== Kingdom of Italy ==
- Monarch – Victor Emmanuel III (1900–1946)
- Prime Minister –
  1. Giovanni Giolitti (1911–1914)
  2. Antonio Salandra (1914–1916)
- Population – 35,701,000

== Events ==
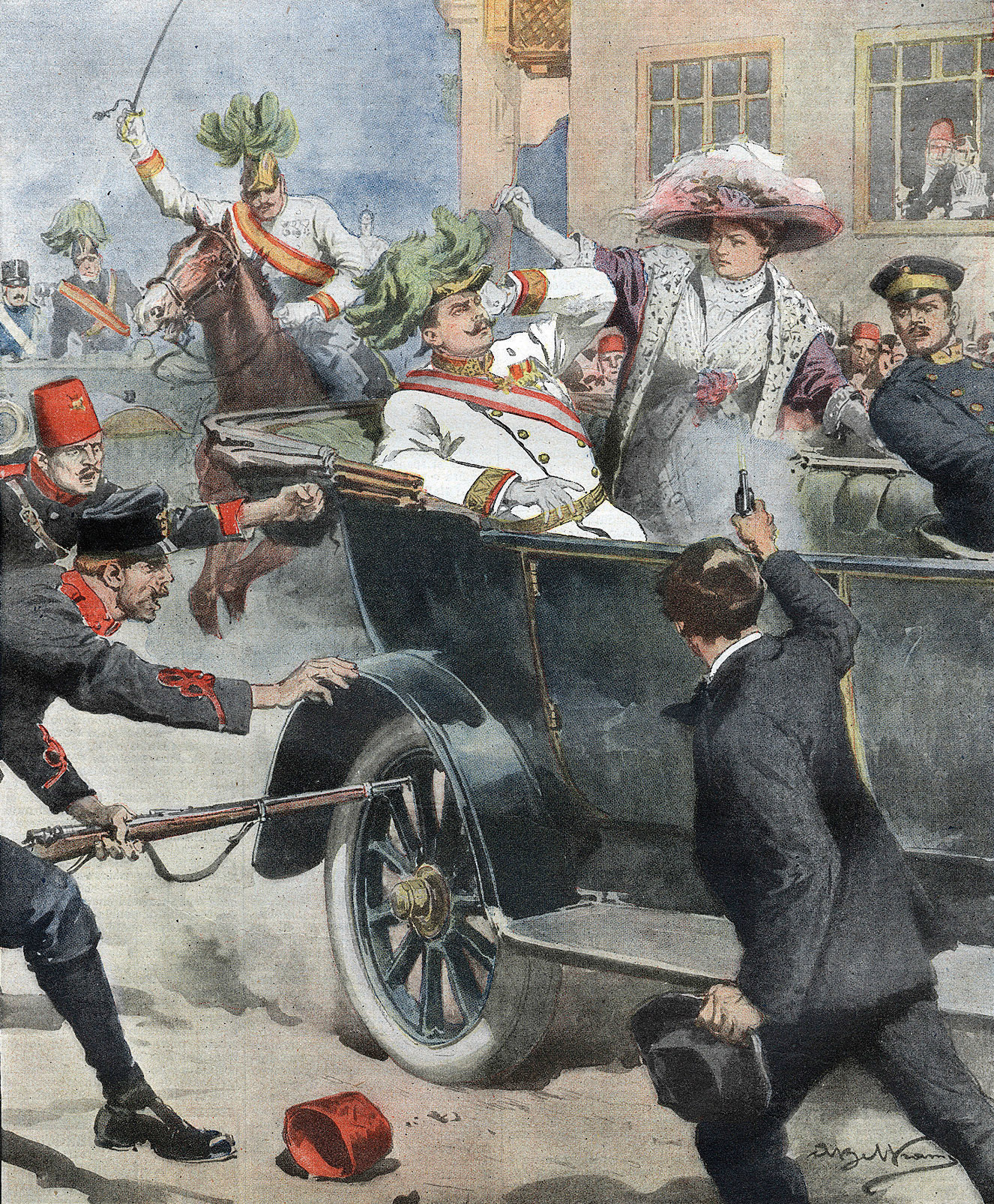
Illustration of the assassination of Archduke Franz Ferdinand of Austria in La Domenica del Corriere, 12 July 1914 by Achille Beltrame.

Despite Italy's official alliance to the German Empire and Austria-Hungary in the Triple Alliance, the country remained neutral in the initial stage of World War I, claiming that the Triple Alliance was only for defensive purposes.

=== March ===
- March 10 – Prime Minister Giovanni Giolitti resigns, as a result of the resignation of radical ministers.
- March 21 – The cons a new government. The government attempts to win the support of nationalists and moves to the political right.

=== May ===
- May 1 – In Trieste clashes break out between Slovenes and Italian irredentists, who organize demonstrations in many Italian cities.
- May 8 – The 4.9 M_{s} Sicily earthquake shakes Catania with a maximum Mercalli intensity of X (Extreme) causing severe damage and 120 deaths.
- May 23 – International exhibition of marine and maritime hygiene opens in Genoa

=== June ===
- June 7 – Red Week after the killing of three anti-militarist demonstrators in Ancona. Many elements of the left protest and the Italian Socialist Party declare a general strike. Various acts of civil disobedience occur in major cities and small towns such as seizing railway stations, cutting telephone wires, and burning tax-registers. Two days later the strike was officially called off, but the civil strife continued. Militarist nationalists and anti-militarist leftists fought on the streets until the Italian Royal Army forcefully restored calm after having used thousands of men to put down the various protesting forces.
- June 28 – Assassination of Archduke Franz Ferdinand of Austria, heir presumptive to the Austro-Hungarian throne, and his wife Sophie, Duchess of Hohenberg in Sarajevo. The assassination led directly to the First World War when Austria-Hungary subsequently issued an ultimatum to the Kingdom of Serbia, which was partially rejected. Austria-Hungary then declared war.

=== August ===
- August 3 – At the outbreak of World War I, the government, led by the conservative Antonio Salandra, declares that Italy would not commit its troops, maintaining that the Triple Alliance had only a defensive stance and Austria-Hungary had been the aggressor. In reality, both Salandra and the minister of Foreign Affairs, Antonino Paternò Castello, begin to probe which side would grant the best reward for Italy's entrance in the war and to fulfil Italy’s irredentist claims. Although the majority of the cabinet (including former Prime Minister Giolitti) is firmly against intervention, numerous intellectuals, including Socialists such as Ivanoe Bonomi and Leonida Bissolati declare in favour of intervention. One of the most prominent and popular Italian nationalist supporters of the war was Gabriele d'Annunzio who helped sway the Italian public to support intervention in the war.
- August 20 – Pope Pius X dies. The Papal conclave assembles and elects Pope Benedict XV on September 3, 1914. He immediately declares the neutrality of the Holy See in World War I.

=== October ===
- October 16 – Foreign Minister Paternò Castello dies and is succeeded ad interim by Prime Minister Salandra.
- October 18 – Benito Mussolini, chief editor of the socialist newspaper Avanti!, declares to be in favour of intervention on the side of the Triple Entente.
- October 20 – The leadership of the Italian Socialist Party (PSI), meeting in Bologna, rejects the motion contrary to the absolute neutrality presented by Mussolini and issues a manifesto against the war.
- October 31 – Treasury Minister Giulio Rubini, contrary to the expected increase in military spending, resigns. The government of Prime Minister Salandra quits, but negotiations about a second Salandra government start.

=== November ===
- November 5 – The second Salandra government is inaugurated with Sidney Sonnino as Foreign Minister, who continues to follow the negotiating strategy set by his predecessor Paternò Castello.
- November 15 – Mussolini founds the newspaper Il Popolo d'Italia ("The People of Italy") advocating militarism and irredentism. The paper was subsidized by the French and industrialists on the pretext of influencing Italy to join the Entente Powers and became the foundation for the Fascist movement in Italy after World War I. Mussolini is expelled from the PSI on November 24.
- November 29 – Italy, although officially neutral, occupies the port of Vlorë in Albania pretending to protect Albanian territories from a Greek invasion.

=== December ===
- December 3 – Prime Minister Salandra addresses the Italian Chamber of Deputies reconfirming Italy's neutralist line, but at the same time claiming the "fair aspirations of Italy".
- December 4 – Giolitti speaks in Parliament in favour of neutrality.

== Sports ==
- April 5 – The Italian rider Ugo Agostoni wins the 8th Milan–San Remo bicycle race.
- May 24–25 – The Italian driver Giovanni "Ernesto" Ceirano wins the 1914 Targa Florio endurance automobile race on Sicily.
- May 24 – June 6 – The Italian rider Alfonso Calzolari wins the 6th Giro d'Italia stage bicycle race.
- July 12 – Casale F.B.C. wins the 1913–14 Italian Football Championship.
- October 25 – The Italian rider Lauro Bordin wins the 10th Giro di Lombardia bicycle race.

== Births ==
- January 17 – Anacleto Angelini, Italian-born businessman (d. 2007)
- February 5 – Silvius Magnago, Italian politician (d. 2010)
- February 22 – Renato Dulbecco, Italian-born virologist, recipient of the Nobel Prize in Physiology or Medicine (d. 2012)
- June 14 – Anna Maria Ortese, Italian short story writer and poet (d. 1998)
- June 27 – Giorgio Almirante, Italian politician, the founder and leader of the Italian Social Movement (d. 1988)
- July 20 – Ersilio Tonini, Italian cardinal (d. 2013)
- August 1 – Bruno Visentini, Italian politician, senator, minister, lecturer and industrialist (d. 1995)
- August 31 – Alfredo Varelli, Italian actor (d. 1996)
- September 14 – Pietro Germi, Italian actor, screenwriter, and director (d. 1974)
- September 16 – Andrea Rizzoli, Italian entrepreneur, publisher and film producer (d. 1983)
- September 26 – Luigi Gui, Italian politician and philosopher (d. 2010)
- November 13 – Alberto Lattuada, Italian film director (d. 2005)
- December 16 – Renzo Franzo, Italian politician (d. 2018)
- December 21 – Liana Millu, author, World War II resistance fighter and holocaust survivor (d. 2005)

== Deaths ==
- 15 February – Giuseppe Vigoni, explorer (b. 1846)
- March 19 – Giuseppe Mercalli, Italian volcanologist (b. 1850)
- 31 March – Christian Morgenstern, German author and poet (born 1871)
- 11 April – Elena Guerra, Italian Roman Catholic religious professed and blessed (b. 1835)
- 24 April – Benedict Menni, Italian Roman Catholic priest and saint (b. 1841)
- 31 May – Angelo Moriondo, Italian inventor of the espresso machine (b. 1851)
- 31 July – Giovanni Lugari, Italian Roman Catholic cardinal (b. 1846)
- 22 August – Giacomo Radini-Tedeschi, Italian Roman Catholic cardinal (b. 1857)
- 10 October – Domenico Ferrata, Italian Roman Catholic cardinal (b. 1847)
- 16 October – Antonino Paternò Castello, Marquis di San Giuliano, Italian diplomat and Minister of Foreign Affairs (b. 1852)
- 17 October – Giuseppe Puzone, Italian composer (b. 1820)
- 24 November – Aristide Cavallari, Italian Roman Catholic cardinal (b. 1849)
- 5 December – Angelo Di Pietro, Italian Roman Catholic cardinal (b. 1828)
- 14 December – Giovanni Sgambati, Italian pianist and composer (b. 1841)

== See also ==
- List of Italian films of 1914
