= Comandini =

Comandini is an Italian surname. Notable people with the surname include:

- Adele Comandini (1898–1987), American screenwriter
- Federico Comandini (1893–1967), Italian politician
- Gianni Comandini (born 1977), Italian footballer
