= 1918 in Italy =

- Decades: 1890s; 1900s; 1910s; 1920s; 1930s
- See also: History of Italy; Timeline of Italian history; List of years in Italy

Events from the year 1918 in Italy.

== Kingdom of Italy ==
- Monarch – Victor Emmanuel III (1900–1946)
- Prime Minister – Vittorio Emanuele Orlando (1917–1919)
- Population – 35,922,000

- Due to World War I and the Spanish flu the Italian population declined by 612,937 people

== Events ==
In the autumn of 1917 at the Battle of Caporetto, the Germans and Austrians had defeated the Italians who fell back to the Piave. The Royal Italian Army lost over 300,000 men. Italy reorganizes the army under the new commander General Armando Diaz and receives reinforcements of the Allied powers.

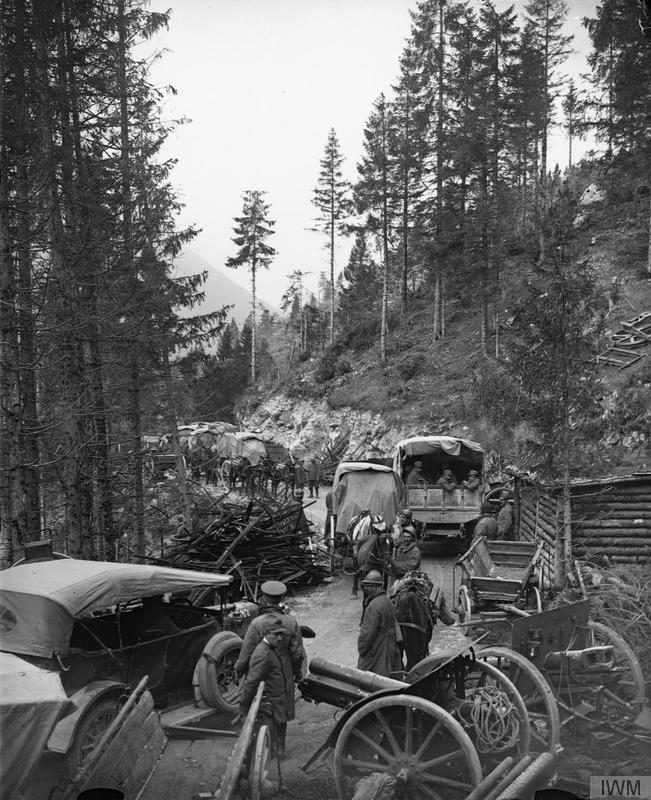
British and Italian troops passing abandoned Austro-Hungarian artillery on the Val d'Assa mountain road 2 November 1918

=== June ===
- June 10 – The Austro-Hungarian dreadnought battleship SMS Szent István is sunk by two Italian MAS motor torpedo boats off the Dalmatian coast.
- June 15–23 – Battle of the Piave River, the last major Austro-Hungarian attack on the Italian Front, which fails. The Battle of the Piave is the decisive battle of World War I on the Italian Front.

=== August ===
- August 9 – Flight over Vienna. Italian poet and nationalist Gabriele D'Annunzio flies over Vienna and dropped 50,000 leaflets on a three-colored card (green, white, and red: the colors of the Italian flag).
- August 13-September 3 – Battle of San Matteo on the Punta San Matteo (3678 m) where Austro-Hungarian troops had set up a fortified position with small artillery pieces, from which they were able to shell the road to the Gavia Pass and thus harass the Italian supply convoys. Italian troops conquer the top but it is retaken by Austro-Hungarian troops.

=== October ===
- October 24-November 3 – Battle of Vittorio Veneto. The Italian victory marked the end of the war on the Italian Front, secured the dissolution of the Austro-Hungarian Empire and contributed to the end of the First World War less than two weeks later.

=== November ===
- November 3 – Armistice of Villa Giusti ends warfare between Italy and Austria-Hungary on the Italian Front during World War I. The armistice was signed in the Villa Giusti, outside of Padua in the Veneto, northern Italy, and was to take effect 24 hours later. The occupation of all Tyrol, including Innsbruck, was completed in the following days.
- November 9 – After the Austrian defeat, Italian troops unilaterally occupied territories of Austria-Hungary promised to Italy by the secret 1915 Pact of London. The city of Split in Dalmatia was not one of those areas and was placed under Allied military occupation; but the Italian minority publicly demanded the annexation of the city into Italy, supported by some Italian political circles. Two French destroyers entered the port of Split. The Italians displayed the flag of Italy in the windows of their homes to give the impression citizens supported Italy's bid for annexation. This however incited a riot and the flags were torn down. The incident would lead to a series of violent fights in Split in the next two years between Croats and Italians.

== Births ==
- September 9 – Oscar Luigi Scalfaro, 9th President of the Italian Republic (died 2012)
- December 27 – Mario Pedini, politician (died 2003)

== Deaths ==
- February 10 – Ernesto Teodoro Moneta, Italian pacifist, Nobel Prize laureate (b. 1833)
- April 14 – Paolo Pizzetti, Italian geodesist, astronomer, geophysicist and mathematician (b. 1860)
- April 30 – Amilcare Cipriani, Italian socialist, anarchist and patriot (b. 1844)
- June 10 – Arrigo Boito, Italian poet and composer (b. 1842)
- June 16 – Attilio Deffenu, Italian journalist, exponent of Sardinian autonomism and a syndicalist who died in the Battle of the Piave River (b. 1890)
- October 19 – Prince Umberto, Count of Salemi, died of Spanish flu (b. 1889)
