= 1911 in Italy =

- Decades: 1890s; 1900s; 1910s; 1920s; 1930s
- See also: History of Italy; Timeline of Italian history; List of years in Italy

Events from the year 1911 in Italy.

== Kingdom of Italy ==
- Monarch – Victor Emmanuel III (1900–1946)
- Prime Minister –
  1. Luigi Luzzatti (1910–1911)
  2. Giovanni Giolitti (1911–1914)
- Population – 35,033,000

== Events ==
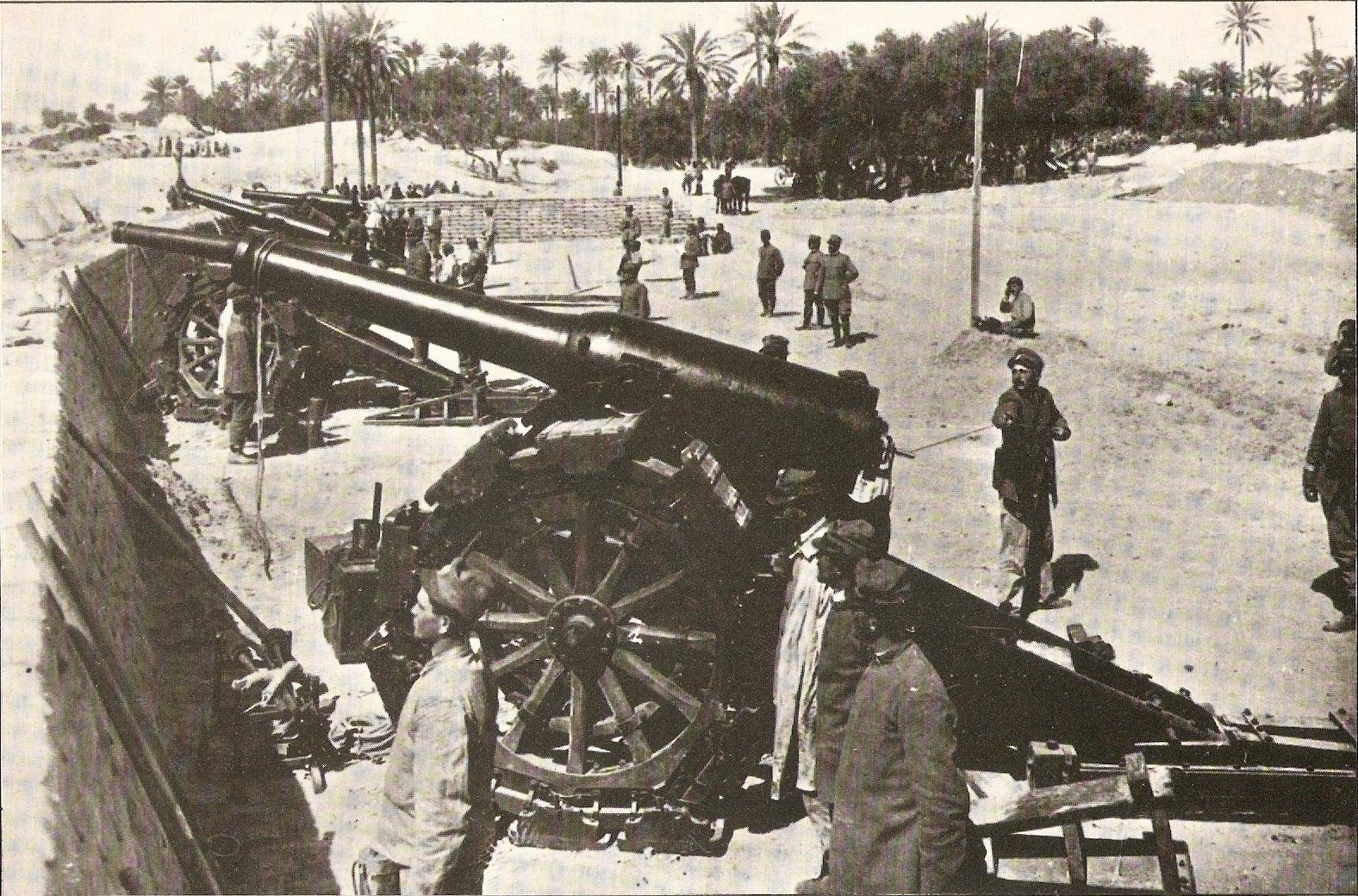
Italian artillery battery during the Italo-Turkish War.

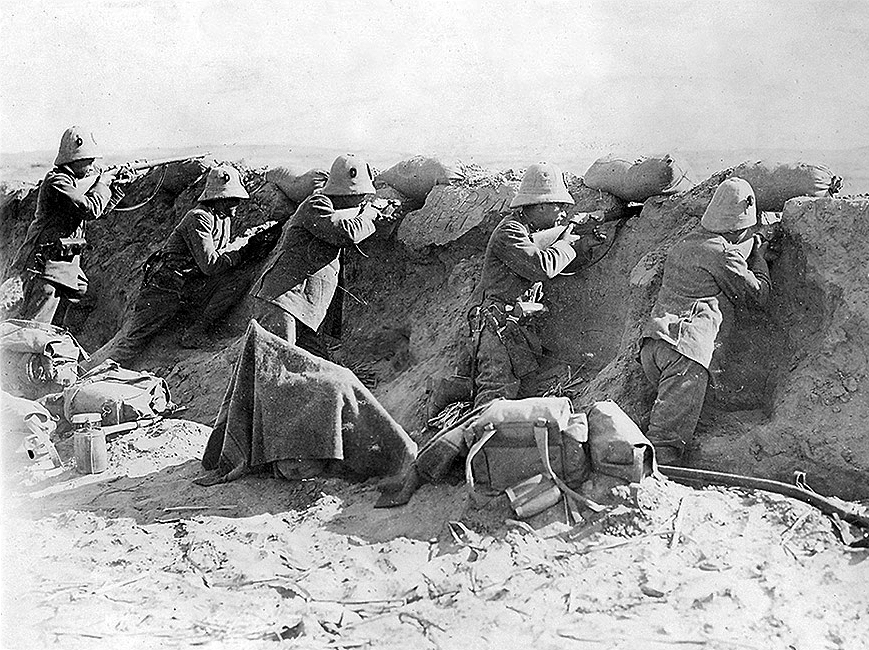
Italian troops firing on the Turks in Tripoli, 1911.

Italy celebrates the 50th anniversary of Italian unification in March–April with a series of exhibitions in Rome (International Exhibition of Art), Florence and Turin (Turin International).

=== March ===
- March 1 – Italian nationalists start to publish a weekly newspaper, L'Idea Nazionale, organ of the Italian Nationalist Association, on the anniversary of the Battle of Adwa, giving full support to Italian imperialism and the Italo-Turkish War. The weekly is founded by Enrico Corradini, Alfredo Rocco and Luigi Federzoni. Corradini wrote two political essays (Il volere d'Italia – "Italy's Desire", and L'ora di Tripoli – "Tripoli's Moment").
  The Italian press began a large-scale lobbying campaign in favour of an invasion of Libya at the end of March 1911. The country was depicted as rich in minerals, well-watered, and defended by only 4,000 Ottoman troops. Also, the population was described as hostile to the Ottoman Empire and friendly to the Italians: the future invasion was going to be little more than a "military walk".
- March 11 – Start of the Cuocolo Trial in Viterbo. The trial was ostensibly to prosecute those charged with the murder of the Camorra boss Gennaro Cuocolo and his wife in 1906, but was transformed into a trial against the Camorra, intending to use it to strike the final blow to the criminal organisation. The verdict was delivered on 8 July 1912.
- March 19 – Prime Minister Luigi Luzzatti resigns over a proposed electoral reform, following the resignation of the radical group from the majority.
- March 23 – For the first time ever, the King consults with a socialist deputy, Leonida Bissolati, about the formation of a new government. Giovanni Giolitti is asked to form a new government. Bissolati declines a post in the new cabinet a few days later.
- March 30 – Giolitti forms a new government.

=== April ===
- April 24 – The 3rd National Congress of the General Confederation of Labour (Confederazione Generale del Lavoro – CGdL), the most important Italian trade union, in Modena, affirms the independence of the trade union movement from party political constraints.

=== June ===
- June 4 – On the 50th anniversary of the unification of Italy, a crowd of one million people turned out in Rome to watch the unveiling of Il Vittoriano, a 250-foot-high monument in honor of King Victor Emmanuel II.
- June 9 – Prime Minister Giolitti presents a new bill on elections introducing almost universal male suffrage. A new law is approved on 30 June 1912.

=== September ===
- September 11 – An eruption of Mount Etna on Sicily sends a lava stream 2,000 feet wide and four feet deep, and leaves 20,000 homeless, between Linguaglossa and Randazzo.
- September 27 – Italy issues an ultimatum to Turkey demanding the surrender of Tripoli and Cyrenaica within twenty-four hours. A general strike against the war is organized by the socialist PSI and CGdL labour union.
- September 29 – Italy declares war on the Ottoman Empire over claims in Libya. The Italo-Turkish War would go on until October 18, 1912. The Italian fleet appeared off Tripoli in the evening of September 28, but only began bombarding the port on October 3. The city was conquered by 1,500 sailors, much to the enthusiasm of the interventionist minority in Italy. Another proposal for a diplomatic settlement was rejected by the Italians, and the Turks determined therefore to defend the province.
  As a result of this conflict, Italy captured Ottoman Tripolitania. These territories together formed what became known as Italian Libya. During the conflict, Italian forces also occupied the Dodecanese islands in the Aegean Sea.

=== October ===
- October 5 – Italian troops occupy Tripoli and Bengazi.
- October 11 – The Italian expeditionary force, commanded by General Carlo Caneva, start the occupation of Tripolitania and Cyrenaica.
- October 24–26 – The 1911 Tripoli massacre: a series of massacres by the Italian army of Libyan civilians of the Tripoli region, and the preceding massacre of Italian captured troops at Sciara Sciat.

=== November ===
- November 1 – World's first combat aerial bombing mission takes place in Libya during the Italo-Turkish War. Second Lieutenant Giulio Gavotti of Italy drops several small bombs.
- November 5 – Italy annexes Tripoli and Cyrenaica (this act is confirmed by an act of the Italian Parliament on February 25, 1912). Many Italians are expelled from the Ottoman Empire (70,000 were living in Constantinople, Smyrna or Beirut).

== Sports ==
- April 2 – The French rider Gustave Garrigou wins the 5th Milan–San Remo bicycle race.
- May 14 – Giovanni "Ernesto" Ceirano wins the 1911 Targa Florio endurance automobile race on Sicily.
- May 18 – June 6 – The Italian rider Carlo Galetti wins the 3rd Giro d'Italia stage bicycle race.
- June 18 – Pro Vercelli wins the 1910–11 Italian Football Championship.
- November 2 – The French rider Henri Pélissier wins the 7th Giro di Lombardia bicycle race.

== Births ==
- April 28 – Luigi Ferrando, Italian racing cyclist (d. 2003)
- July 2 – Diego Fabbri, Italian playwright (d. 1980)
- July 7 – Gian Carlo Menotti, Italian composer (d. 2007)
- December 3 – Nino Rota, Italian composer (d. 1979)

== Deaths ==
- April 25 – Emilio Salgari, Italian writer (b. 1862)
- May 16 – Lorenzo Panepinto, Italian politician and teacher involved in the Fasci Siciliani (Sicilian Leagues), killed by the Sicilian Mafia (b. 1865)
