= 1910 in Italy =

- Decades: 1890s; 1900s; 1910s; 1920s; 1930s
- See also: History of Italy; Timeline of Italian history; List of years in Italy

Ilva Bagnoli inauguration June 19th, 1910

Events from the year 1910 in Italy.

== Kingdom of Italy ==
- Monarch – Victor Emmanuel III (1900–1946)
- Prime Minister –
  1. Sidney Sonnino (1909–1910)
  2. Luigi Luzzatti (1910–1911)
- Population – 34,751,000

== Events ==
=== March ===
- March 21 – Prime Minister Sidney Sonnino resigns. Luigi Luzzatti is asked to form a new government.
- March 31 – Luzzatti's new government is accepted by the Italian Chamber of Deputies.

=== April ===
- April 4–5 – Former U.S. President Theodore Roosevelt visits Rome and dines with the King.

=== May ===
- May 5 – In Milan, the General Confederation of Italian Industry (Italian: Confederazione generale dell'industria italiana), commonly known as Confindustria, the Italian employers' federation and national chamber of commerce is founded.

=== June ===
- June 5 – By a narrow majority, the national leadership of the Italian Socialist Party (PSI) decides to support the new government.
- June 7 – An earthquake hits the Province of Avellino and the town of Calitri in particular.

=== October ===
- October 21 – The 11th National Congress of the Italian Socialist Party (PSI) is held in Milan, dominated by the conflict between the reformist wing and the intransigent wing of the left. Leonida Bissolati and Ivanoe Bonomi attack Filippo Turati from the right, while Giuseppe Emanuele Modigliani and Gaetano Salvemini criticize from the left. At the far left is Benito Mussolini who is participating for the first time at the national party congress.

=== December ===
- December 3 – The first Nationalist Congress is held in Florence after which the Italian Nationalist Association (Associazione Nazionalista Italiana, ANI) is founded under the influence of Italian nationalists such as Enrico Corradini and Giovanni Papini. Upon its formation, the ANI supported the repatriation of Austrian held Italian-populated lands to Kingdom of Italy and was willing to endorse war with Austria-Hungary to do so.

== Sports ==
- April 3 – The French rider Eugène Christophe wins the 4th Milan–San Remo bicycle race.
- May 1 – Internazionale from Milan wins the 1909–10 Italian Football Championship.
- May 15 –
  - The first game of the Italy's national football team. In Milan, Italy defeats France by a score of 6–2. Some turmoil kept the players of Pro Vercelli who were the best team of the league, out of the game. At the end of the match, the players received some cigarette packets thrown by the 4,000 spectators as a prize.
  - Tullio Cariolato wins the 1910 Targa Florio endurance automobile race on Sicily driving a Franco.
- May 18–June 5 – The Italian rider Carlo Galetti wins the second Giro d'Italia stage bicycle race.
- November 6 – The Italian rider Giovanni Micheletto wins the 6th Giro di Lombardia bicycle race.

== Births ==
- January 16 – Mario Tobino, Italian poet, writer and psychiatrist (d. 1991)
- February 15 – Charlie Cairoli, Italian-born British clown (d. 1980)
- March 5 – Ennio Flaiano, Italian screenwriter, playwright, novelist, journalist and drama critic (d. 1972)
- March 25 – Magda Olivero, Italian soprano (d. 2014)
- April 12 – Gillo Dorfles, Italian art critic, painter and philosopher (d. 2018)
- April 24 – Pupella Maggio, Italian actress (d. 1999)
- May 12 – Giulietta Simionato, Italian mezzo-soprano (d. 2010)
- July 21 – Pietro Pasinati, Italian footballer (d. 2000)
- August 10 – Aldo Buzzi, Italian architect, director and screenwriter (d. 2009)
- October 13 – Claudia Baccarini, Italian centenarian

== Deaths ==
- February 14 – Giovanni Passannante, Italian anarchist (b. 1849)
- May 10 – Stanislao Cannizzaro, Italian chemist (b. 1826)
- July 4 – Giovanni Schiaparelli, Italian astronomer (b. 1835)
- November 6 – Giuseppe Cesare Abba, Italian patriot and writer (b. 1838)
