= 1913 in Italy =

- Decades: 1890s; 1900s; 1910s; 1920s; 1930s
- See also: History of Italy; Timeline of Italian history; List of years in Italy

Events from the year 1913 in Italy.

== Kingdom of Italy ==
- Monarch – Victor Emmanuel III (1900–1946)
- Prime Minister – Giovanni Giolitti (1911–1914)
- Population – 35,351,000
  - 872,598 Italians leave the country of which 376,776 migrate to the United States

== Events ==
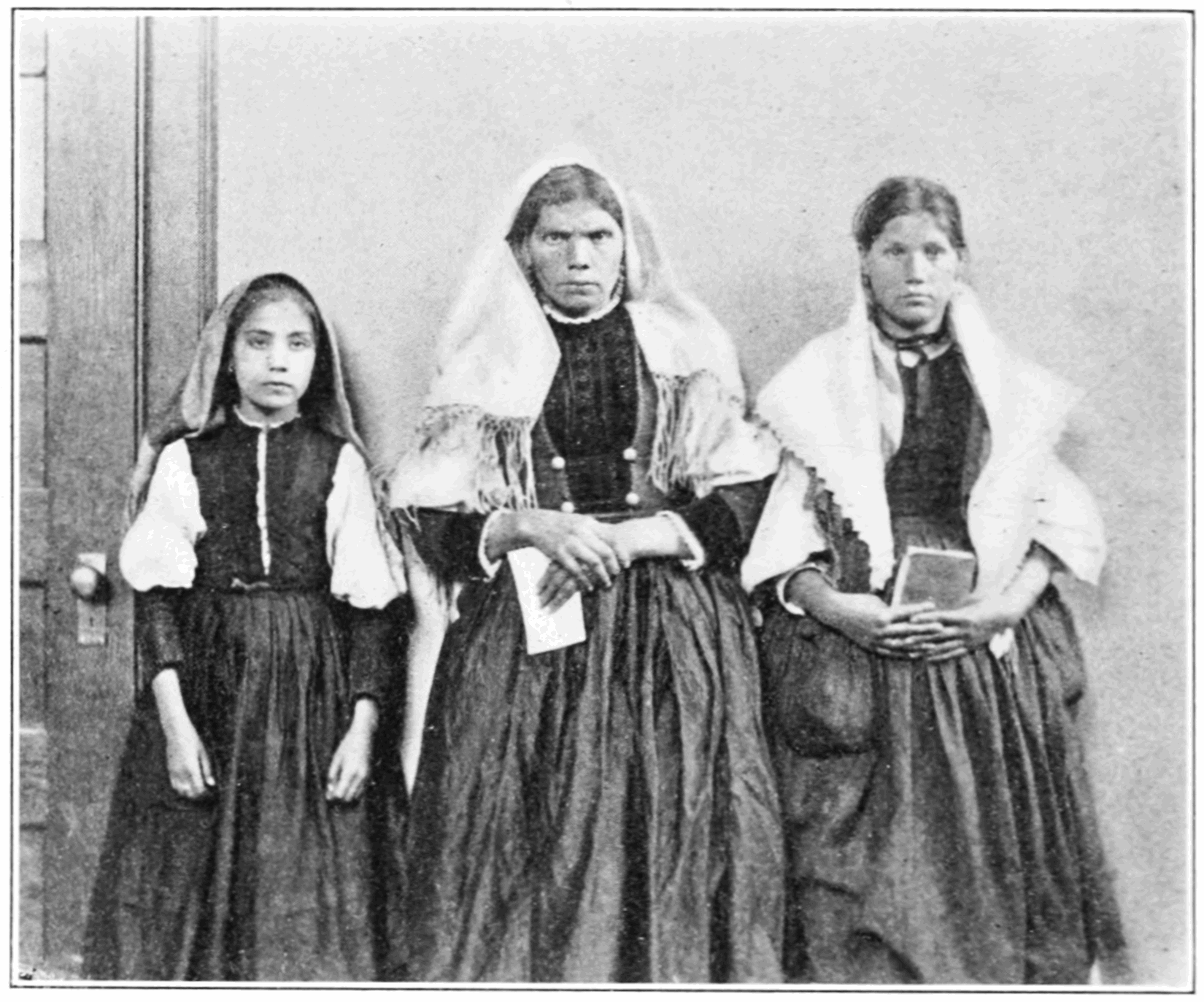
Italian immigrant women at Ellis Island. In 1913 872,598 Italians left the country of which 376,776 migrated to the United States.

The First Balkan War (October 1912 – May 1913) of the Balkan League (Bulgaria, Serbia, Greece and Montenegro) against the Ottoman Empire. As a result of the war, the allies captured and partitioned almost all remaining European territories of the Ottoman Empire. Ensuing events also led to the creation of an independent Albanian state. Despite its success, Bulgaria was dissatisfied over the division of the spoils in Macedonia, which provoked the start of the Second Balkan War (June–August 1913).
After the withdrawal of the Ottoman army from Libya after the Italo-Turkish War the Italians could easily extend their occupation of the country, seizing East Tripolitania, Ghadames, the Djebel and Fezzan with Murzuk during 1913.

=== April ===
- April 19 – Strike of automobile workers of the Isotta Fraschini, Bianchi and Alfa companies in Lombardy, which extends to other areas. The strike is disavowed by the Confederazione Generale del Lavoro (CGdL).

=== May ===
- May 6 – The Hague Court of Arbitration ordered the Kingdom of Italy to pay $32,800 damages to France for seizing the steamers Carthage and Manouba during the Italo–Turkish War.
- May 16 – At Sidi Garba in Tripolitania, 1,000 Italian soldiers were killed or wounded in fighting with the Libyan natives. After forcing a group of Libyans to retreat, the men rested and were surrounded and attacked. General Ganbretti would later describe the loss as "the bloodiest day in the whole Italo-Turkish War".

=== June ===
- June 19 – Italian occupying forces fought a fierce battle against the Arab residents of Libya, at Ettangi, Tripolitania.

=== August ===
- August 9 – A diplomat from Austria-Hungary told representatives from Italy and Germany that his Empire intended to plan an invasion of Serbia. The private discussion would be revealed on December 5, 1914, by Italian Prime Minister Giovanni Giolitti, who said that Italy refused to participate. Austria-Hungary and Italy strongly opposed the arrival of Serbian army on the Adriatic Sea because they perceived it as a threat to their domination of the Adriatic and feared that Serbian Adriatic port could become a Russian base.
- August 11 – The London ambassadors conference, of Europe's six "Great Powers" (Austria-Hungary, France, Germany, Italy, Russia, the United Kingdom), settled on the boundaries of the new Principality of Albania, created from former Turkish territory by the Balkan League during the First Balkan War.

=== October ===
- October 26 – First round of Italian general election. Changes in the electoral law made in 1912 widened the voting franchise to include all literate men aged 21 or over who had served in the armed forces. For those over 30 the literacy requirement was abolished. This raised the number of eligible voters from 2,930,473 in 1909 to 8,443,205. Due to the Gentiloni pact, a secret deal in the run-up to the 1913 general election between Prime Minister Giovanni Giolitti and Ottorino Gentiloni, the president of the Catholic Electoral Union, Catholic voters supported Giolitti's Liberal candidates in return for support for Catholic policies, especially funding of Catholic private schools and opposition to a law permitting divorce. It was estimated that over 200 deputies were elected through the Pact, sufficient to provide a majority for Giolitti.

=== November ===
- November 2 – Second round of Italian general election. The two historical parliamentary factions, the liberal and progressive Left and the conservative and monarchist Right, formed a single liberal and centrist group, known as The Liberals, under the leadership of Giovanni Giolitti, which narrowly retained an absolute majority in the Chamber of Deputies, while the Radical Party emerged as the largest opposition bloc. Both groupings did particularly well in Southern Italy, while the Italian Socialist Party gained eight seats and was the largest party in Emilia-Romagna.

== Arts ==
- Eugene de Blaas - God's Creatures
- Umberto Boccioni
  - Dinamismo di un Ciclista
  - Dinamismo di un calciatore
- Giorgio de Chirico
  - Ariadne
  - The Transformed Dream
  - The Soothsayer's Recompense
- Luigi Russolo - Dinamismo di un automobile

== Film ==
- Mario Caserini - Ma l'amor mio non muore
- Enrico Guazzoni
  - Marcantonio e Cleopatra
  - Quo Vadis

== Literature ==
- Grazia Deledda - Canne al vento

== Music ==
- Pietro Mascagni - Parisina

== Sports ==
- March 30 – The Belgian rider Odile Defraye wins the 7th Milan–San Remo bicycle race.
- May 11–12 – The Italian driver Felice Nazzaro wins the 1913 Targa Florio endurance automobile race on Sicily.
- May 6–22 – The Italian rider Carlo Oriani wins the 5th Giro d'Italia stage bicycle race.
- June 1 – Pro Vercelli wins the 1912–13 Italian Football Championship.
- November 2 – The French rider Henri Pélissier wins the 9th Giro di Lombardia bicycle race.
- December 16 – Parma Calcio 1913 S.r.l., commonly referred to as Parma, is an Italian football club based in the city of Parma is founded.

== Births ==
- January 10 – Franco Bordoni, Italian racing driver and pilot (d. 1975)
- July 1 – Mario Acerbi, Italian footballer (d. 2010)
- July 22 – Gorni Kramer, Italian bandleader and songwriter (d. 1995)
- August 22 – Bruno Pontecorvo, Italian nuclear physicist and Soviet spy who defected to the USSR (d. 1993)
- September 29 – Silvio Piola, Italian footballer (d. 1996)
- October 24 – Tito Gobbi, Italian operatic baritone (d. 1984)

== Deaths ==
- March 1 – Mario Pieri, Italian mathematician (b. 1860)
