= 1912 in Italy =

- Decades: 1890s; 1900s; 1910s; 1920s; 1930s
- See also: History of Italy; Timeline of Italian history; List of years in Italy

Events from the year 1912 in Italy.

== Kingdom of Italy ==
- Monarch – Victor Emmanuel III (1900–1946)
- Prime Minister – Giovanni Giolitti (1911–1914)
- Population – 35,246,000

== Events ==
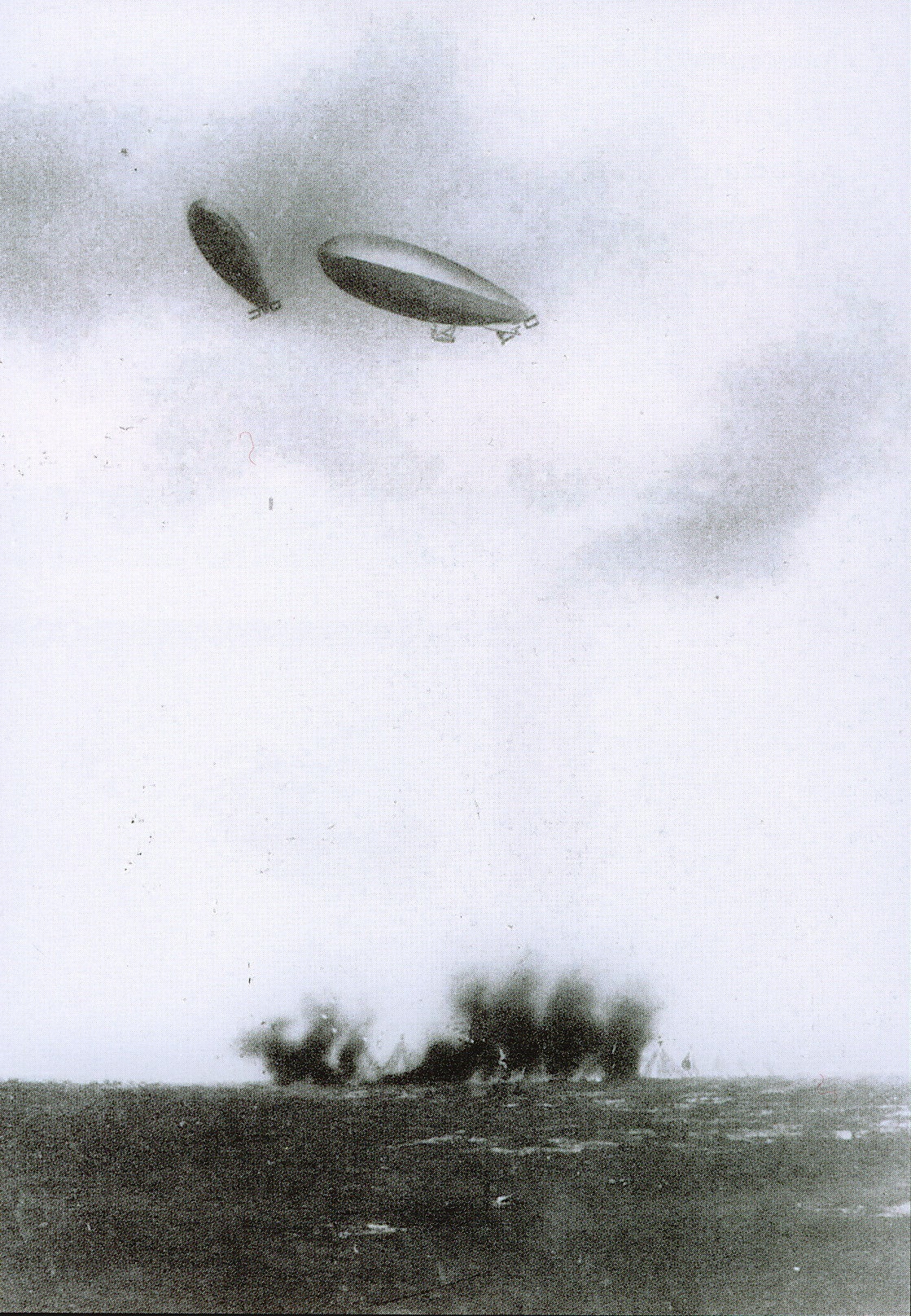
Italian dirigibles bomb Turkish positions in Libya. The Italo-Turkish War of 1911–1912 was the first in history in which air attacks (carried out here by dirigible airships) determined the outcome.

The Italo-Turkish War between the Kingdom of Italy and the Ottoman Empire over Italian claims in Libya is ongoing. While Italian conscripts faced death in the Libyan desert, a new electoral law grants almost universal male suffrage; the electorate, below 3 million in 1909, rises to nearly 8.5 million.

=== January ===
- January 7 – The Battle of Kunfuda Bay, the largest naval battle of the Italo-Turkish War in the Red Sea. the Italian cruiser Piemonte, with the Soldato-class destroyers Artigliere and Garibaldino, sank seven Turkish gunboats. Successively the Italians blocked and damaged the main ports of Yemen.

=== February ===
- February 24 – Battle of Beirut: Italy launches a surprise attack on the Ottoman port of Beirut; the cruiser Giuseppe Garibaldi and the gunboat Volturno bombard the harbour, killing 97 sailors and civilians. As a result of the battle all Ottoman naval forces in the region were annihilated, thus ensuring the approaches to the Suez Canal were open to the Italians. The Ottoman naval presence at Beirut was completely annihilated and casualties on the Ottoman side were heavy. The Italian navy gained complete naval dominance of the southern Mediterranean for the rest of the war.

=== March ===
- March 6 – Italian forces are the first to use airships in war, as two dirigibles drop bombs on Turkish troops encamped at Janzur in north-western Libya, from an altitude of 6,000 feet. Although Italy could extend its control to almost all of the 2,000 km of the Libyan coast between April and early August 1912, its ground forces could not venture beyond the protection of the navy's guns and were thus limited to a thin coastal strip.

=== May ===
- May – Italy occupies 13 Turkish-held Dodecanese islands, including Rhodes, in the Aegean Sea.

=== June ===
- June 30 – Introduction of universal male suffrage in Italy by Law No. 666 of 30 June 1912. The right to vote was extended to all male citizens over the age of 30 without any income or education requirements, while the conditions of income, military service or educational qualifications previously required remained in place for adults under the age of 30. The electorate grew from 3,300,000 to 8,443,205, of whom 2,500,000 were illiterate, equal to 23.2% of the population. The Chamber rejected the granting of voting rights to women.

=== July ===
- July 7-10 – The 13th Congress of the Italian Socialist Party, convened in extraordinary session in Reggio Emilia, exacerbates the divisions within the party over the war in Libya. The maximalist faction triumphs and the expulsion of the leaders of the reformist factions, headed by Ivanoe Bonomi and Leonida Bissolati, is ratified. The socialist representative who fiercely attacks the reformists at the congress, inciting the crowd against them, is Benito Mussolini. The maximalist faction elects Costantino Lazzari as secretary and removes the reformist Claudio Treves as director of the party newspaper Avanti!.
- July 10 – The Italian Reformist Socialist Party is founded by leading reformists Leonida Bissolati and Ivanoe Bonomi who had been expelled from the Italian Socialist Party because of their desire of entering in the majority supporting Prime Minister Giovanni Giolitti. Bissolati's refusal to oppose the war with Turkey for the conquest of Libya triggered his resignation as socialist Member of Parliament in February 1912.
- July 12 – The Cuocolo Trial against the Camorra reaches a verdict. After often tumultuous 17 months, the 47 defendants that included 27 leading Camorra associates were sentenced to a total of 354 years' imprisonment. Enrico Alfano, the main defendant and alleged head of the Camorra, was sentenced to 30 years.

=== October ===
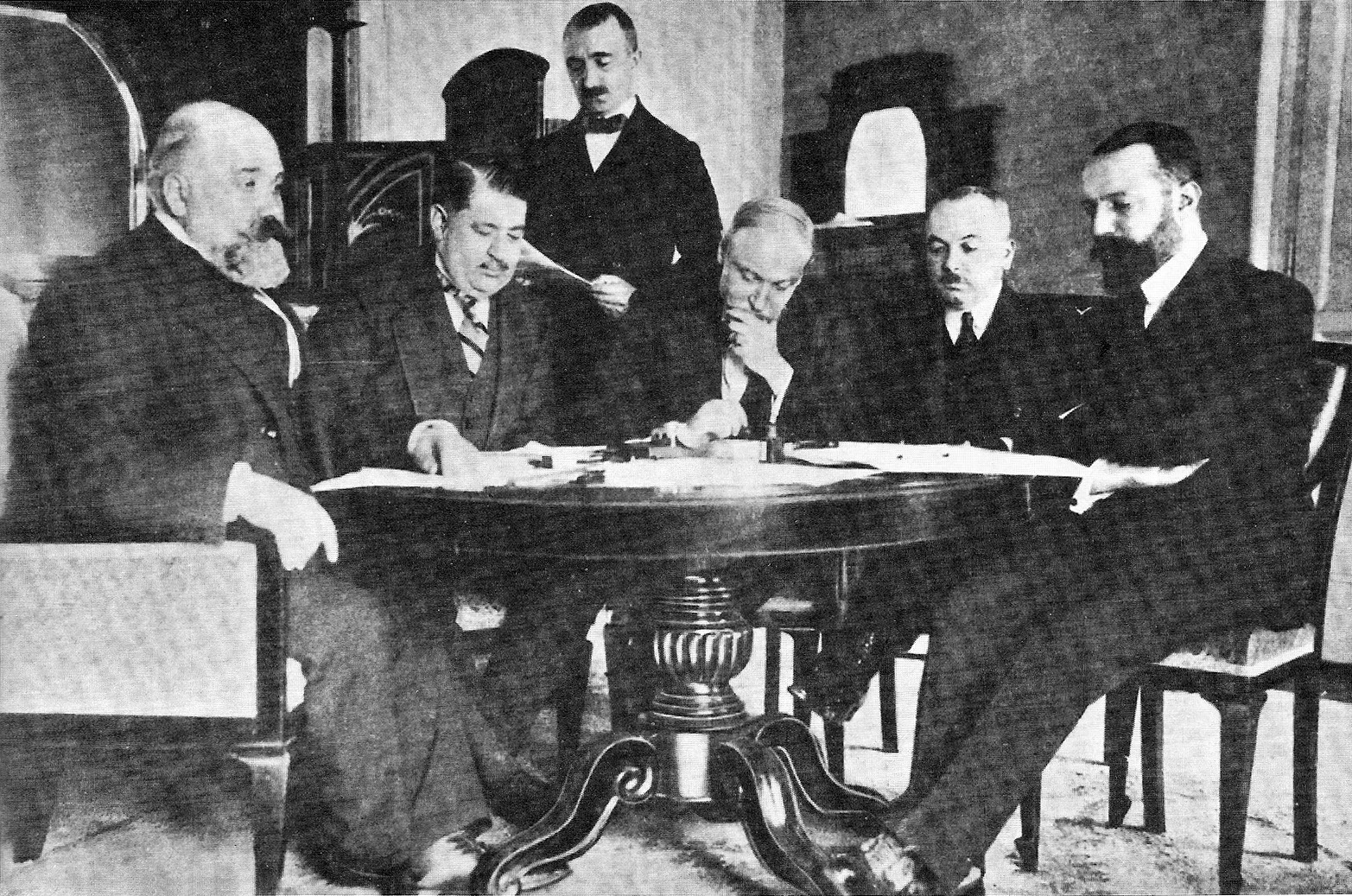
Turkish and Italian delegations in Lausanne (1912). From left to right (seating): Pietro Bertolini, Mehmet Nabi Bey, Guido Fusinato, Rumbeyoğlu Fahreddin Bey, and Giuseppe Volpi.

- October 18 – With the Treaty of Lausanne in Ouchy near Lausanne the Italo-Turkish War ends. The war costs Italy 1.3 billion lire, nearly a billion more than Prime Minister Giovanni Giolitti estimated before the war, ruining ten years of fiscal prudence. Italy obtains control over the colonies of Cyrenaica and Tripolitania, as well as the Dodecanese islands. After the withdrawal of the Ottoman army the Italians could easily extend their occupation of Libya, seizing East Tripolitania, Ghadames, the Djebel and Fezzan with Murzuk during 1913.

=== November ===
- November 20 – The Ministry of the Colonies is established to govern the country's colonial possessions and the direction of their economies.
- November 23 – Revolutionary syndicalist organizations leave the Confederazione Generale del Lavoro (CGdL) trade union and form the Unione Sindacale Italiana (USI).

=== December ===
- December 1 – Benito Mussolini, one of the leaders of the extreme left majority of the Italian Socialist Party, assumes the direction of party newspaper Avanti!.

== Sports ==
- March 31 – The French rider Henri Pélissier wins the 6th Milan–San Remo bicycle race.
- May 5 – Pro Vercelli wins the 1911–12 Italian Football Championship.
- May 25–26 – The British driver Cyril Snipe and his co-driver Pedrini win the 1912 Targa Florio endurance automobile race on Sicily.
- May 19 – June 4 – The Atala-Dunlop team that finished with Carlo Galetti, Eberardo Pavesi, and Giovanni Micheletto, wins the 4th Giro d'Italia stage bicycle race.
- October 27 – The Italian rider Carlo Oriani wins the 8th Giro di Lombardia bicycle race.

== Births ==
- March 4 – Afro Basaldella, Italian painter (d. 1976)
- September 29 – Michelangelo Antonioni, Italian film director (d. 2007)
- October 17 – Pope John Paul I, Italian churchman (d. 1978)
- December 11 – Carlo Ponti, Italian film producer (d. 2007)
- December 24 – Natalino Otto, Italian singer (d. 1969)

== Deaths ==
- March 4 – Augusto Aubry, Italian admiral and politician (b. 1849)
- March 22 – Ruggero Oddi, Italian physiologist and anatomist (b. 1864)
- April 6 – Giovanni Pascoli, Italian poet (b. 1855)
