= Marta Grandi =

Italian entomologist (1915–2005)

Marta Grandi (3 July 1915 – 6 October 2005) was an Italian entomologist who specialised in Ephemeroptera. She worked for the University of Bologna's Institute of Entomology for thirty years, and described several new species.

== Life ==
Marta Grandi was born in Bologna in Italy on 3 July 1915. Her uncle Guido Grandi was an entomologist, having founded the University of Bologna's Institute of Entomology and subsequently directed it for more than 30 years.

Grandi graduated in natural sciences in 1938, and initially worked as a volunteer at the Institute of Entomology, and ended up with a thirty year career at the institute. She quickly specialised in Ephemeroptera, which had been little studied in Italy at that time. Grandi began with species from the Emilia-Romagna region, and then extended her studies to other regions of Italy, and to species from Africa. Grandi described several new species of mayfly. Grandi's studies encompassed systematics, behaviour and life-cycle, and comparative anatomy, and she conducted field work as well as laboratory studies on reared insects. She was particularly interested in the flight behaviour of adult mayflies.

In 1962 Grandi was awarded the Prize for Natural Sciences by the National Academy of Lincei with the Ministry of Education. She was also elected a member of the Italian National Academy of Entomology, although reluctantly. In total she published forty-six papers, and her last publication was in 1973. Grandi died in October 2005, in Bologna. Her taxonomic collections and publications were donated to the Institute of Entomology.

== Publications ==
- Ephemeroidea. Fauna d'Italia 3:1-472 (1960).

See Bibliography of Ephemeroptera
