= Claudio Casanova =

Italian footballer (1895–1916)

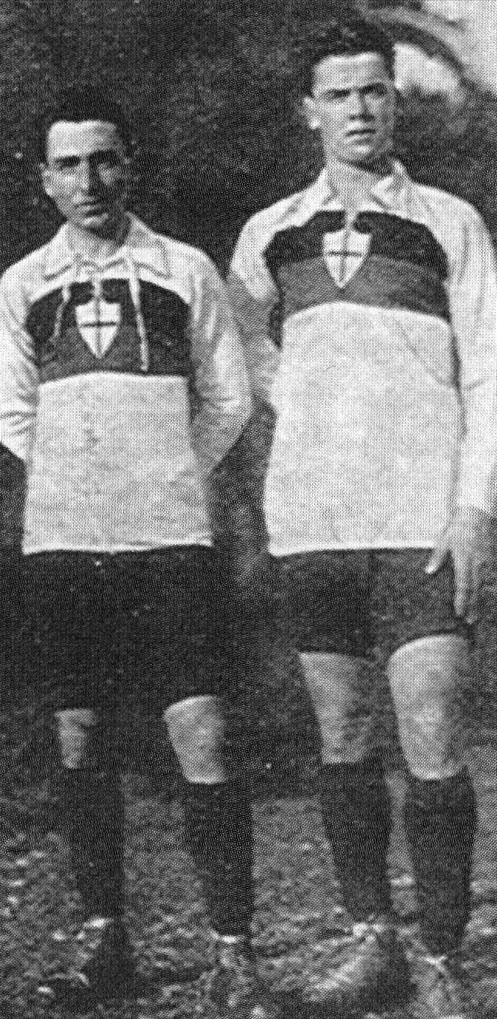
- Claudio Casanova (right) with Renzo De Vecchi circa 1914

Personal information
- Full name: Claudio Maurizio Casanova
- Date of birth: 21 October 1895
- Place of birth: Genoa, Kingdom of Italy
- Date of death: 20 April 1916 (aged 20)
- Place of death: Genoa, Kingdom of Italy
- Position: Defender

Senior career*
Years	Team	Apps	(Gls)
1911–1912	Libertas Cornigliano		
1912–1915	Genoa	46	(0)

International career
1914	Italy	1	(0)
- * Club domestic league appearances and goals

Claudio Maurizio Casanova (Italian pronunciation: [ˈklaudjo mauˈrittsjo kazaˈnɔːva, – kasa-]; 21 October 1895 – 20 April 1916) was an Italian professional footballer who played as a defender.

== International career ==
Casanova made his only appearance for the Italy national football team on 17 May 1914 in a game against Switzerland.

== Death ==
Casanova died from the injuries he suffered at the front in World War I.
