= Renzo Franzo =

Italian politician (1914–2018)

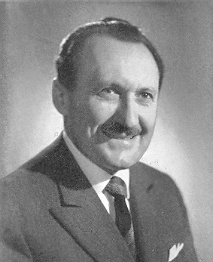
Renzo Franzo

Renzo Franzo (16 December 1914 – 3 March 2018) was an Italian politician.

He was born in Palestro on 16 December 1914. He moved to Vercelli and later Turin. There, Franzo served in the Chamber of Deputies from 1948 to 1968 as a member of the Christian Democracy. He died on 3 March 2018, aged 103 at Santa Corona Hospital in Pietra Ligure.
