= Federico Comandini =

Italian politician

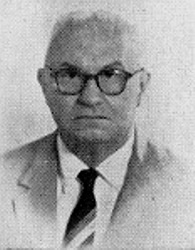

Member of the Chamber of Deputies
- In office 1958 – 1963

Personal details
- Born: 11 August 1893
- Died: 15 February 1967 (aged 73)
- Party: Italian Socialist Party (in office); Popular Unity; Action Party

Federico Comandini (11 August 1893 - 15 March 1967) was an Italian politician.

Comandini was born in Cesena. He was at first active in the Action Party, then in Popular Unity, then in the Italian Socialist Party, which he represented in the Chamber of Deputies from 1958 to 1963.

Comandini was also a member of Giustizia e Libertà, an anti-fascist resistance group.
