= Antonio Salandra =

Italian politician (1853–1931)

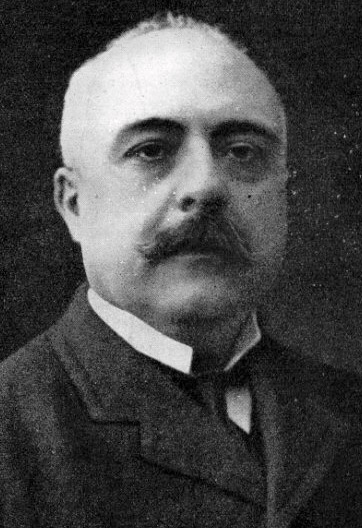

Prime Minister of Italy
- In office 21 March 1914 – 18 June 1916
- Monarch: Victor Emmanuel III
- Preceded by: Giovanni Giolitti
- Succeeded by: Paolo Boselli

Minister of the Interior
- In office 21 March 1914 – 18 June 1916
- Prime Minister: Himself
- Preceded by: Giovanni Giolitti
- Succeeded by: Vittorio Emanuele Orlando

Member of the Senate of the Kingdom
- In office 20 May 1928 – 9 December 1931
- Appointed by: Victor Emmanuel III

Member of the Chamber of Deputies
- In office 10 June 1886 – 20 May 1928
- Constituency: Foggia

Personal details
- Born: 13 August 1853 Troia, Apulia, Kingdom of the Two Sicilies
- Died: 9 December 1931 (aged 78) Rome, Kingdom of Italy
- Party: Historical Right (1901–1913); Liberals (1913–1921); Democratic Liberal Party (1921–1922); Italian Liberal Party (1922–1924)
- Education: University of Naples
- Profession: Journalist, politician, lawyer

Antonio Salandra (Italian: [anˈtɔːnjo saˈlandra]; 13 August 1853 – 9 December 1931) was a conservative Italian politician, journalist, and writer who served as the 21st prime minister of Italy between 1914 and 1916. He ensured the entry of Italy in World War I on the side of the Triple Entente (the United Kingdom, France, and the Russian Empire) to fulfil Italy's irredentist claims.

== Early life and political career ==
Born in Troia (Province of Foggia, Apulia), he graduated from the University of Naples in 1875 and then became instructor and later professor of administrative law at the University of Rome.

He was Minister of Agriculture (1899–1900) in the conservative government of Luigi Pelloux and subsequently Minister of the Treasury (1906) and Italian Minister of Finance (1909–1910) in the governments of Sidney Sonnino.

== Prime minister ==
In March 1914, the conservative Salandra was brought into the national cabinet upon the fall of the government of Giovanni Giolitti, as the choice of Giolitti himself, who still commanded the support of most Italian parliamentarians. Salandra's government was the most conservative one that Italy had seen for a long time. Salandra soon fell out with Giolitti over the question of Italian participation in World War I.

At the outbreak of World War I in August 1914, Salandra declared that Italy would not commit its troops, maintaining that the Triple Alliance had only a defensive stance and Austria-Hungary had been the aggressor. In reality, both Salandra and his ministers of Foreign Affairs, Antonino Paternò Castello, who was succeeded by Sidney Sonnino in November 1914, began to probe which side would grant the best reward for Italy's entrance in the war and to fulfil Italy's irredentist claims.

== Entering World War I ==
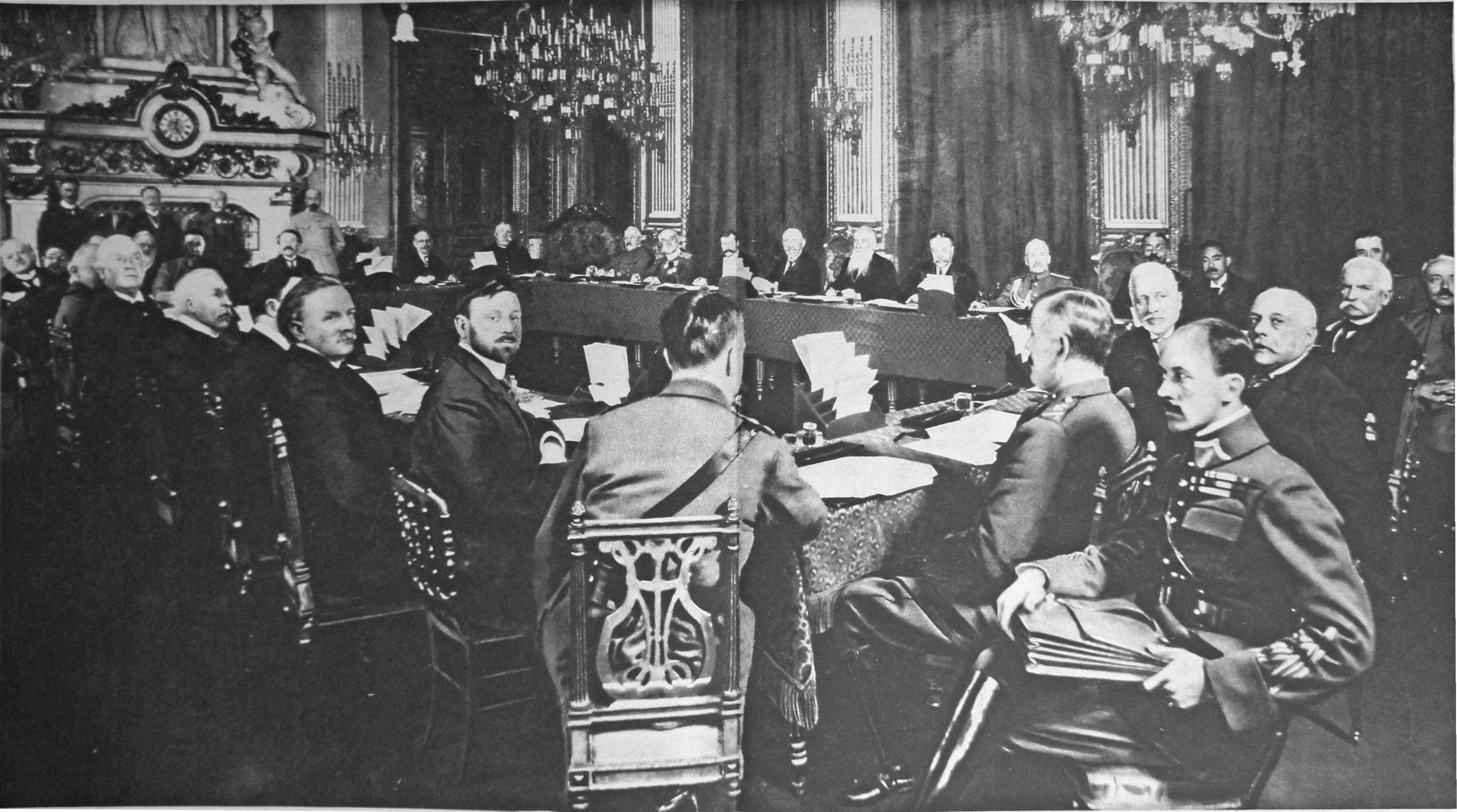
Salandra and ambassador Tommaso Tittoni at a conference of the Allied Powers on 27–28 March 1916 in Paris

Salandra used the term "sacred egoism" (sacro egoismo) to define Italy's outlook on which side Italy would enter the war. Expecting the war would be short – over by the late summer of 1915 – there was some pressure on the decision to make.

Negotiations had been started between Sonnino, the British Foreign Secretary Edward Grey and the French Foreign Minister Jules Cambon.

On February 16, 1915, despite concurrent negotiations with Austria, a courier was dispatched in great secrecy to London with the suggestion that Italy was open to a good offer from the Entente. [ ...] The final choice was aided by the arrival of news in March of Russian victories in the Carpathians. Salandra began to think that victory for the Entente was in sight, and was so anxious not to arrive too late for a share in the profits that he instructed his envoy in London to drop some demands and reach agreement quickly. [...] The Treaty of London was concluded on April 26 binding Italy to fight within one month. [...] Not until May 4 did Salandra denounce the Triple Alliance in a private note to its signatories.

The secret pact, the Treaty of London or London Pact (Italian: Patto di Londra), was signed between the Triple Entente (the United Kingdom, France, and the Russian Empire) and the Kingdom of Italy. According to the pact, Italy was to leave the Triple Alliance and join the Triple Entente. Italy was to declare war against Germany and Austria-Hungary within a month in return for territorial concessions at the end of the war.

While Giolitti supported neutrality, Salandra and Sonnino supported intervention on the side of the Entente, and secured Italy's entrance into the war despite the opposition of the majority in parliament. On 3 May 1915, Italy officially revoked the Triple Alliance. In the following days Giolitti and the neutralist majority of the Parliament opposed declaring war, while nationalist crowds demonstrated in public areas for entering the war. On 13 May 1915, Salandra offered his resignation, but Giolitti, fearful of nationalist disorder that might break into open rebellion, declined to succeed him as prime minister and Salandra's resignation was not accepted.

On 23 May 1915, Italy declared war on Austria-Hungary. Salandra had expected that Italy's entrance on the allied side would bring the war to a quick solution. However the stalemated bloody war lasted far longer than anticipated. This weakened Salandra's ministry, especially when he refused to appoint neutralists to important positions. Five unsuccessful Italian offensives on the Isonzo and the Austro-Hungarian Trentino Offensive in May to July 1916 contributed to a military crisis that led to the collapse of Salandra's government on 10 June 1916, due to a combination of neutralist deputies and those who believed that Salandra had not been effective enough in the war effort. He played no further role in the war but was a member of the Italian delegation to the Paris Peace Conference in 1919.

After World War I, Salandra moved further to the right, and supported Mussolini's accession to power in 1922. Nine years later he died in Rome.

He was awarded the Serbian Order of Karađorđe's Star.

== Works ==
He is the author of a considerable number of works on economics, finance, history, law, and politics (New International Encyclopedia). These include:

- Tratto della giustizia amministrativo (1904)
- La politica nazionale e il partito liberale (1912)
- Lezioni di diritto amministrativo (two volumes, 1912)
- Politica e legislazione : saggi, raccolti da Giustino Fortunato (1915)
- Il discorso contro la malafede tedesca (1915)
- Italy and the Great War: From Neutrality to Intervention (London: Edward Arnold, 1932),

== See also ==
- Italian entry into World War I
- Radiosomaggismo

Political offices
Preceded by Giovanni Giolitti	Prime Minister of Italy; 1914–1916	Succeeded by Paolo Boselli
Preceded by Giovanni Giolitti	Italian Minister of the Interior; 1914–1916	Succeeded by Vittorio Emanuele Orlando
