= Paolo Boselli =

Prime minister of Italy during World War I

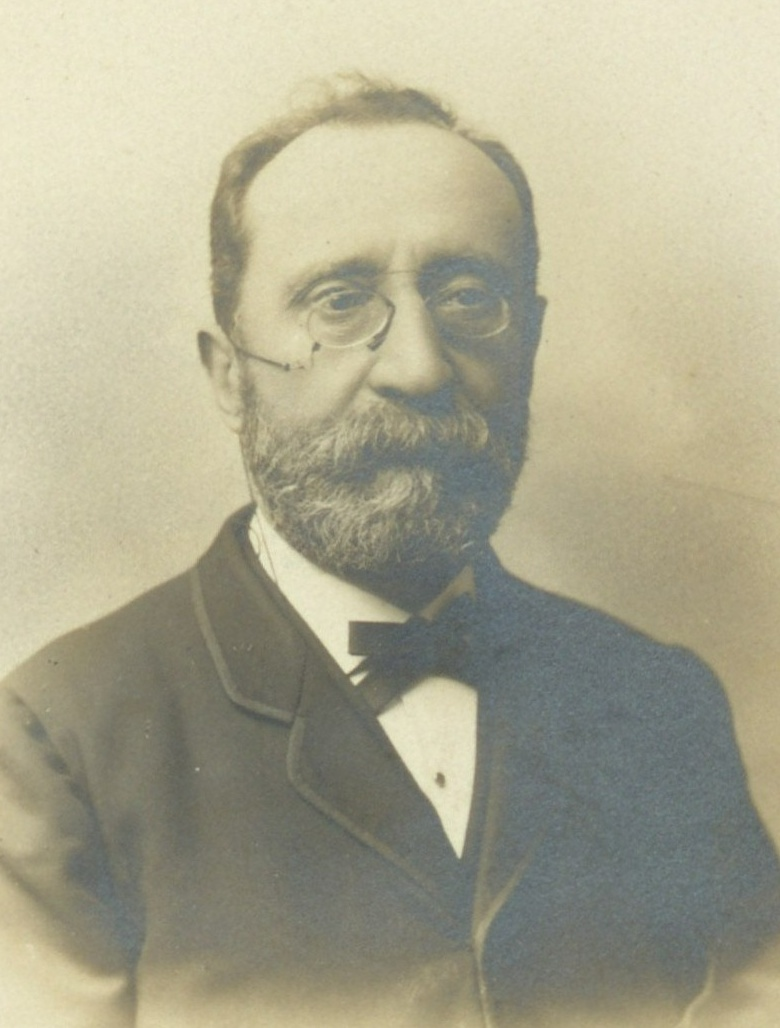

Prime Minister of Italy
- In office 18 June 1916 – 29 October 1917
- Monarch: Victor Emmanuel III
- Preceded by: Antonio Salandra
- Succeeded by: Vittorio Emanuele Orlando
Ministerial offices
Minister of the Treasury
In office 14 May 1899 – 24 June 1900
Prime Minister	Luigi Pelloux
Preceded by	Pietro Vacchelli
Succeeded by	Giulio Rubini
Minister of Finances
In office 14 June 1894 – 10 March 1896
Prime Minister	Francesco Crispi
Preceded by	Sidney Sonnino
Succeeded by	Ascanio Branca
Minister of Agriculture, Industry and Commerce
In office 15 December 1893 – 14 June 1894
Prime Minister	Francesco Crispi
Preceded by	Pietro Lacava
Succeeded by	Augusto Barazzuoli
Minister of Public Education
In office 17 February 1888 – 6 February 1891
Prime Minister	Francesco Crispi
Preceded by	Michele Coppino
Succeeded by	Pasquale Villari
Parliamentary offices
Member of the Senate of the Kingdom
In office 18 June 1921 – 10 March 1932
Appointed by	Victor Emmanuel III
Member of the Chamber of Deputies
In office 5 December 1870 – 7 April 1921
Constituency	Savona

Personal details
- Born: 8 June 1838 Savona, Kingdom of Sardinia
- Died: 10 March 1932 (aged 93) Rome, Kingdom of Italy
- Party: Italian Liberal Party

Paolo Boselli (Italian: [ˈpaːolo boˈzɛlli]; 8 June 1838 – 10 March 1932) was an Italian politician who served as the 34th prime minister of Italy during World War I.

== Biography ==
Boselli was born in Savona, Liguria. Boselli was the first professor of science at the University of Rome prior to entering politics. He served for 51 years as a liberal rightist parliamentary deputy, and as a senator from 1921. Appointed Minister of Education in 1888, Boselli reorganised the Bank of Italy with his next portfolio, as Minister of the Treasury in 1899. He also served in Sidney Sonnino's 1906 government.

In June 1916, he was a relatively undistinguished center-right politician and one of the oldest members of the Italian parliament, when he was appointed prime minister, following the collapse of the Salandra government as a result of military defeats. Boselli formed an ideologically broad coalition composed of one Catholic, one republican, two reformist socialists, two radicals, five left-wing liberals, and six conservative-liberals.

His government fell in October 1917 as a result of the military defeat in the Battle of Caporetto, in which Italy lost some 800,000 men, all of the conquest made so far in World War I, as well as Friuli and parts of the Veneto. Boselli had been a strong supporter of commander-in-chief Luigi Cadorna, who was also fired in the aftermath of Caporetto.

During Boselli's time as prime minister, a decree of August 1917 extended the principle of compulsory insurance against accidents to agricultural workers generally. He died in Rome on 10 March 1932, and was buried in Turin.

Political offices
Preceded by Antonio Salandra	Prime Minister of Italy; 1916–1917	Succeeded by Vittorio Emanuele Orlando
