= Vittorio Emanuele Orlando =

Italian politician (1860–1952)

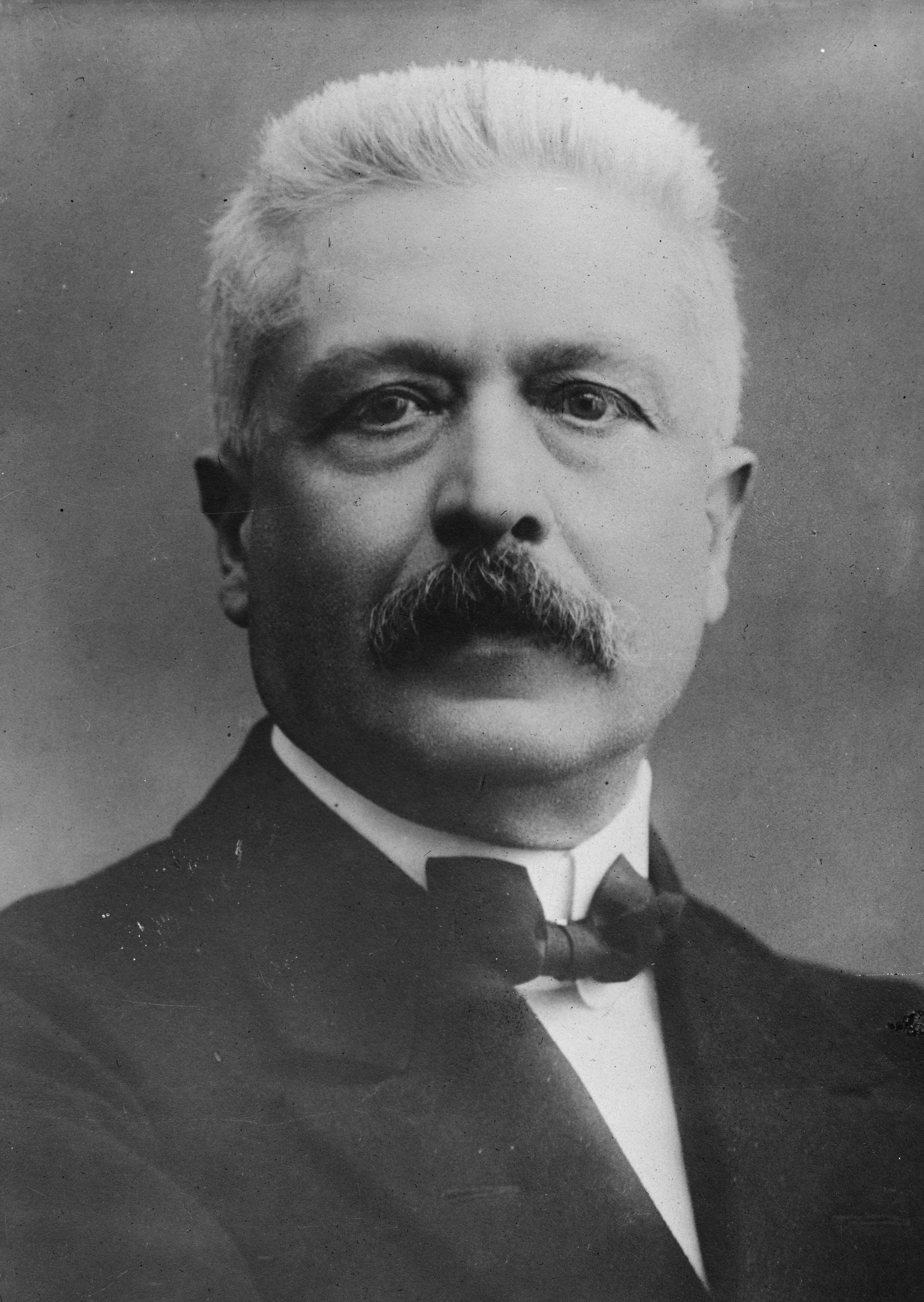

Prime Minister of Italy
- In office 30 October 1917 – 23 June 1919
- Monarch: Victor Emmanuel III
- Preceded by: Paolo Boselli
- Succeeded by: Francesco Saverio Nitti

President of the Chamber of Deputies
- In office 15 July 1944 – 25 July 1946
- Monarchs: Victor Emmanuel III; Umberto II
- Preceded by: Dino Grandi
- Succeeded by: Giuseppe Saragat
- In office 1 December 1919 – 25 June 1920
- Monarch: Victor Emmanuel III
- Preceded by: Giuseppe Marcora
- Succeeded by: Enrico De Nicola

Minister of the Interior
- In office 18 June 1916 – 23 June 1919
- Prime Minister: Paolo Boselli; Himself
- Preceded by: Antonio Salandra
- Succeeded by: Francesco Saverio Nitti

Member of the Senate of the Republic
- Ex officio
- Life tenure 8 May 1948 – 1 December 1952

Member of the Constituent Assembly
- In office 25 June 1946 – 31 January 1948
- Constituency: Italy at-large

Member of the Chamber of Deputies
- In office 5 April 1897 – 21 January 1929
- Constituency: Partinico

Personal details
- Born: 19 May 1860 Palermo, Kingdom of the Two Sicilies
- Died: 1 December 1952 (aged 92) Rome, Italy
- Party: Historical Left (1897–1913); Liberals (1913–1919); Democratic Liberal Party (1919–1926); Italian Liberal Party (1926–1952)
- Education: University of Palermo
- Profession: Jurist, teacher, politician

Vittorio Emanuele Orlando (Italian: [vitˈtɔːrjo emanuˈɛːle orˈlando]; 19 May 1860 – 1 December 1952) was an Italian prime minister known for representing Italy in the 1919 Paris Peace Conference with his foreign minister Sidney Sonnino. He was also known as "Premier of Victory" for defeating the Central Powers along with the Entente in World War I. Italy entered into World War I in 1915 with the aim of completing national unity: for this reason, it is also considered the Fourth Italian War of Independence, in a historiographical perspective that identifies in the latter the conclusion of the unification of Italy, whose military actions began during the revolutions of 1848 with the First Italian War of Independence.

Orlando was the provisional president of the Chamber of Deputies between 1943 and 1945, and a member of the Constituent Assembly that changed the Italian form of government into a republic. Aside from his prominent political role, Orlando was a professor of law and is known for his writings on legal and judicial issues, which number over a hundred works.

== Early life and career ==
Orlando was born in Palermo, Sicily. His father, a landed gentleman, delayed venturing out to register his son's birth for fear of Giuseppe Garibaldi's Expedition of the Thousand, who had just stormed into Sicily on the first leg of their march to build an Italian nation. Orlando taught law at the University of Palermo and was recognized as an eminent jurist. In 1897, he was elected in the Italian Chamber of Deputies (Italian: Camera dei Deputati) for the district of Partinico for which he was constantly reelected until 1925. He aligned himself with Giovanni Giolitti, who was Prime Minister of Italy five times between 1892 and 1921.

== Prime minister ==
A liberal, Orlando served in various roles as a minister. In 1903, he served as Minister of Education under Prime Minister Giolitti. In 1907, he was appointed Minister of Justice, a role he retained until 1909. He was re-appointed to the same ministry in November 1914 in the government of Antonio Salandra until his appointment as Minister of the Interior in June 1916 under Paolo Boselli. After the Italian military disaster in World War I at Caporetto on 25 October 1917, which led to the fall of the Boselli government, Orlando became prime minister, and he continued in that role through the rest of the war. He had been a strong supporter of Italy's entry in the war. He successfully led a patriotic national front government, the Unione Sacra, and reorganized the army. Orlando was encouraged in his support of the Allies because of secret incentives offered to Italy in the London Pact of 1915. Italy was promised significant territorial gains in Dalmatia.

Orlando's first act as head of the government was to fire General Luigi Cadorna and appoint the well-respected General Armando Diaz in his place. He then reasserted civilian control over military affairs, which Cadorna had always resisted. His government instituted new policies that treated Italian troops less harshly and instilled a more efficient military system, which were enforced by Diaz. The Ministry for Military Assistance and War Pensions was established, soldiers received new life insurance policies to help their families in the case of their deaths, more funding was put into propaganda efforts aimed at glorifying the common soldier, and annual paid leave was increased from 15 to 25 days. On his own initiative Diaz also softened the harsh discipline practiced by Cadorna, increased rations, and adopted more modern military tactics which had been observed on the Western Front. All of these had the net effect of greatly increasing the formerly-crumbling army's morale. Orlando's government quickly proved popular among the general population and successfully reconstituted national morale after the disaster of Caporetto, with Orlando even publicly pledging to retreat to "my Sicily" if necessary and resist the Austrian invaders from there, though he was also assured that there would be no military collapse.

With the Austro-Hungarian offensive stopped by Diaz at the Second Battle of the Piave River, a lull in fighting ensued on the Italian front as both sides brought up their logistical elements. Orlando ordered an investigation into the causes of the defeat at Caporetto, which confirmed that it was the fault of the military leadership. While he continued to reform the military, he refused demands from both sides of the political aisle calling for mass trials of generals and ministers. The Italian front stabilized enough under his leadership that Italy was able to send hundreds of thousands of troops to the Western Front to buttress their allies while themselves preparing for a major offensive to knock Austria-Hungary out of the war. This offensive materialized in November 1918, the Italians launched the Battle of Vittorio Veneto and routed the Austro-Hungarians, a feat that coincided with the collapse of Austro-Hungarian Army and the end of the First World War on the Italian Front, as well as the end of the Austro-Hungarian Empire. The fact that Italy recovered and ended up on the winning side in 1918 earned for Orlando the title "Premier of Victory."

== Paris Peace Conference ==
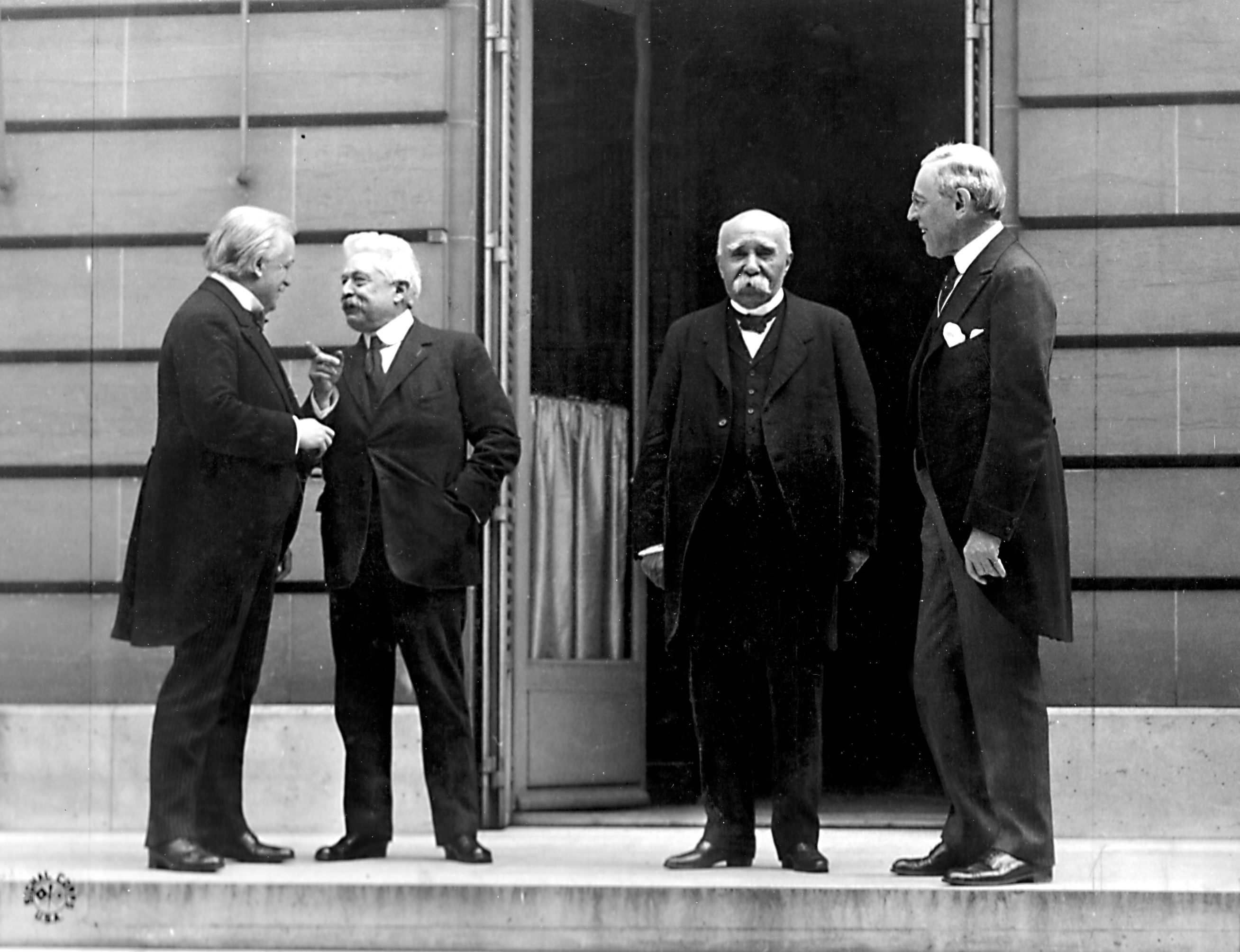
The heads of the "Big Four" nations at the Paris Peace Conference, 27 May 1919. From left to right: David Lloyd George, Vittorio Orlando, Georges Clemenceau, and Woodrow Wilson.

Orlando was one of the Big Four, the main Allied leaders and participants at the Paris Peace Conference in 1919, along with U.S. President Woodrow Wilson, French prime minister Georges Clemenceau and Britain's Prime Minister David Lloyd George. Although, as prime minister, he was the head of the Italian delegation, Orlando's inability to speak English and his weak political position at home allowed the conservative foreign minister, the half-Welsh Sidney Sonnino, to play a dominant role.

Their differences proved to be disastrous during the negotiations. Orlando was prepared to renounce territorial claims for Dalmatia to annex Rijeka (or Fiume as the Italians called the town) — the principal seaport on the Adriatic Sea — while Sonnino was not prepared to give up Dalmatia. Italy ended up claiming both and received neither, running up against Wilson's policy of national self-determination. Orlando supported the Racial Equality Proposal introduced by Japan at the conference.

Orlando dramatically left the conference early on April 24, 1919. He returned briefly the following month, but was forced to resign just days before the signing of the resultant Treaty of Versailles. The fact he was not a signatory to the treaty became a point of pride for him later in his life. French prime minister Georges Clemenceau dubbed him "The Weeper", and Orlando himself recalled proudly: "When ... I knew they would not give us what we were entitled to ... I writhed on the floor. I knocked my head against the wall. I cried. I wanted to die."

His political position was seriously undermined by his failure to secure Italian interests at the Paris Peace Conference. Orlando resigned on 23 June 1919, following his inability to acquire Fiume for Italy in the peace settlement. The so-called "Mutilated victory" was one of the causes of the rising of Benito Mussolini. In December 1919, he was elected president of the Italian Chamber of Deputies, but never again served as prime minister.

== Fascism and final years ==
When Benito Mussolini seized power in 1922, Orlando initially tactically supported him, but broke with him over the murder of Giacomo Matteotti in 1924. After that, he abandoned politics and resigned from the Chamber of Deputies in 1925, until 1935, when Mussolini's invasion of Ethiopia stirred Orlando's nationalism. He reappeared briefly in the political spotlight when he wrote Mussolini a supportive letter. In 1944, he made something of a political comeback. With the fall of Mussolini, Orlando became leader of the National Democratic Union. He was chosen as the president of the Chamber of Deputies until 25 September 1945. In 1946, he was elected to the Constituent Assembly of Italy. In 1948 he was a candidate for the presidency of the republic (elected by Parliament) but was defeated by Luigi Einaudi. He died in 1952 in Rome.

== Controversies ==
Orlando was a controversial figure. Some authors criticize the blunt way he represented Italy at the 1919 Paris Peace Conference, in contrast to his more diplomatic foreign minister Sidney Sonnino. Other authors say that Orlando was connected to the Mafia and mafiosi from beginning to end of his long parliamentary career, but no court ever investigated the issue. A Mafia pentito and state witness, Tommaso Buscetta, claimed that Orlando was himself actually a member of the Mafia, a man of honour. In Partinico, he was supported by the Mafia boss Frank Coppola, who had been deported back to Italy from the US.

In 1925, Orlando stated in the Italian senate that he was proud of being mafioso and intended it to mean a "man of honor" but making no admission of links to organized crime, saying that "if by the word 'mafia' we understand a sense of honour pitched in the highest key; a refusal to tolerate anyone's prominence or overbearing behaviour; ... a generosity of spirit which, while it meets strength head on, is indulgent to the weak; loyalty to friends ... If such feelings and such behaviour are what people mean by 'the mafia', ... then we are actually speaking of the special characteristics of the Sicilian soul: and I declare that I am a mafioso, and proud to be one." He maintained a strong rivalry with the prominent statesman and party colleague Francesco Saverio Nitti. French Prime Minister Georges Clemenceau and US President Woodrow Wilson criticized his behavior at the Paris Peace Conference.

== Works ==
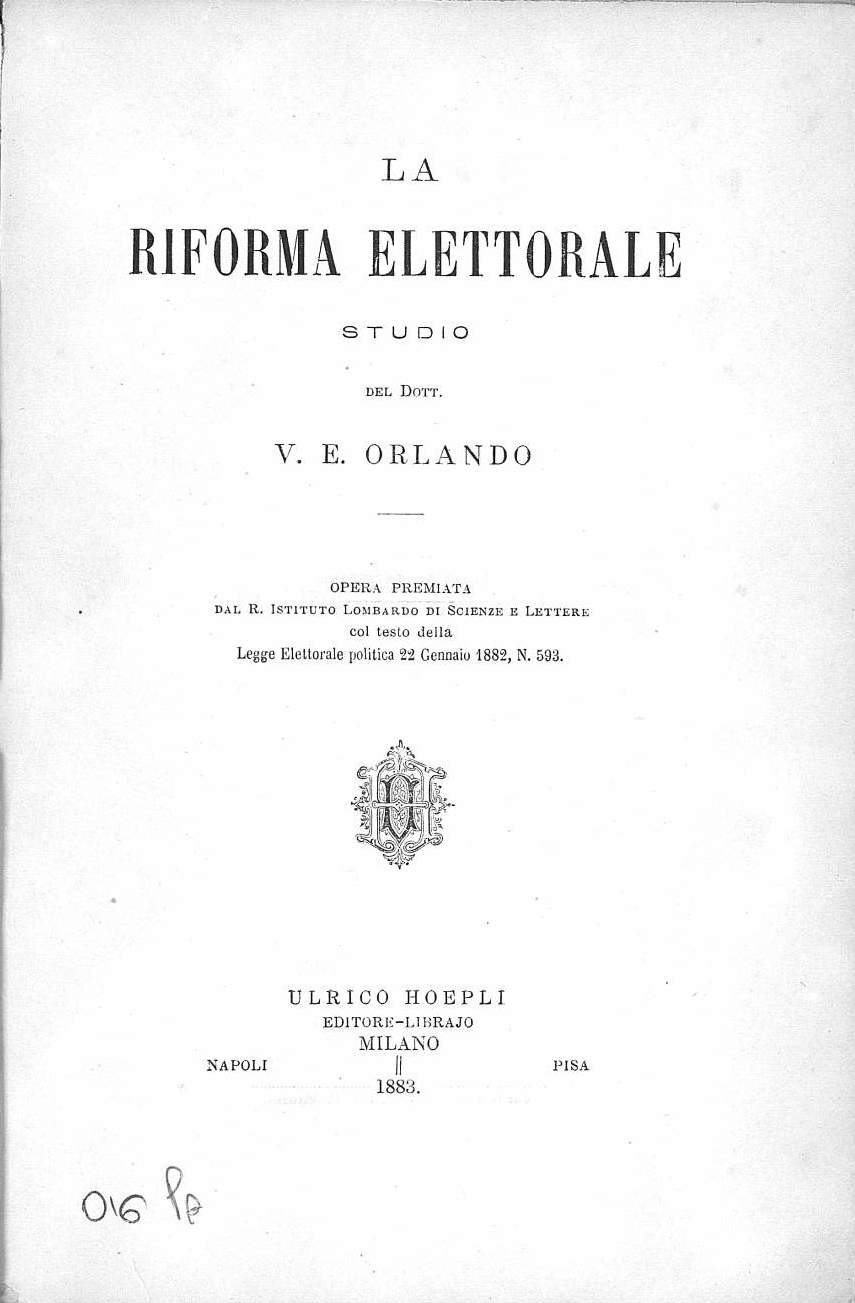
La riforma elettorale, 1883

- Della riforma elettorale, Milano, 1881
  - La riforma elettorale. Milano: Hoepli. 1883.
- Le fratellanze artigiane in Italia, Firenze, 1884
- Della resistenza politica individuale e collettiva, Torino, 1885
- Principi di diritto costituzionale, Firenze, 1889
- Principi di diritto amministrativo, Firenze, 1890
  - Principii di diritto amministrativo. Firenze: G. Barbera. 1915.
- Teoria giuridica delle guarentigie della libertà, Torino, 1890
- Primo trattato completo di diritto amministrativo italiano. Vol. 1. Milano: Società Editrice Libraria. 1900.
  - Primo trattato completo di diritto amministrativo italiano. Vol. 2. Milano: Società Editrice Libraria. 1915.
  - Primo trattato completo di diritto amministrativo italiano. Vol. 2. Milano: Società Editrice Libraria. 1935.
  - Primo trattato completo di diritto amministrativo italiano. Vol. 3. Milano: Società Editrice Libraria. 1907.
  - Primo trattato completo di diritto amministrativo italiano. Vol. 4. Milano: Società Editrice Libraria. 1904.
  - Primo trattato completo di diritto amministrativo italiano. Vol. 4. Milano: Società Editrice Libraria. 1905.
  - Primo trattato completo di diritto amministrativo italiano. Vol. 5. Milano: Società Editrice Libraria. 1930.
  - Primo trattato completo di diritto amministrativo italiano. Vol. 6. Milano: Società Editrice Libraria. 1930.
  - Primo trattato completo di diritto amministrativo italiano. Vol. 10. Milano: Società Editrice Libraria. 1930.
  - Primo trattato completo di diritto amministrativo italiano. Vol. 10. Milano: Società Editrice Libraria. 1932.
- La giustizia amministrativa, Milano, 1901
- Le régime parlamentaire en Italie, Parigi, 1907
- Lo Stato e la realtà, Milano, 1911
- Discorsi per la guerra, Roma, 1919
- Crispi, Palermo, 1923
- Discorsi per la guerra e per la pace, Foligno, 1923
- Diritto pubblico generale e diritto pubblico positivo, Milano, 1924
- Recenti indirizzi circa i rapporti fra diritto e Stato, Tivoli, 1926
- L'opera storica di Michele Amari, Milano, 1928
- Su alcuni miei rapporti di governo con la Santa Sede, Napoli, 1929
- Immunità parlamentari e organi sovrani, Tivoli, 1933
- Diritto pubblico generale, Milano, 1940
- Scritti vari di diritto pubblico e scienza politica, Milano, 1940
- Discorsi parlamentari, Bologna, 2002
