= God's Creatures =

God's Creatures may refer to:

- God's Creatures (painting), a 1913 painting by Eugen von Blaas
- God's Creatures (film), a 2022 psychological drama film
