= In the Water =

1914 painting by Eugene de Blaas

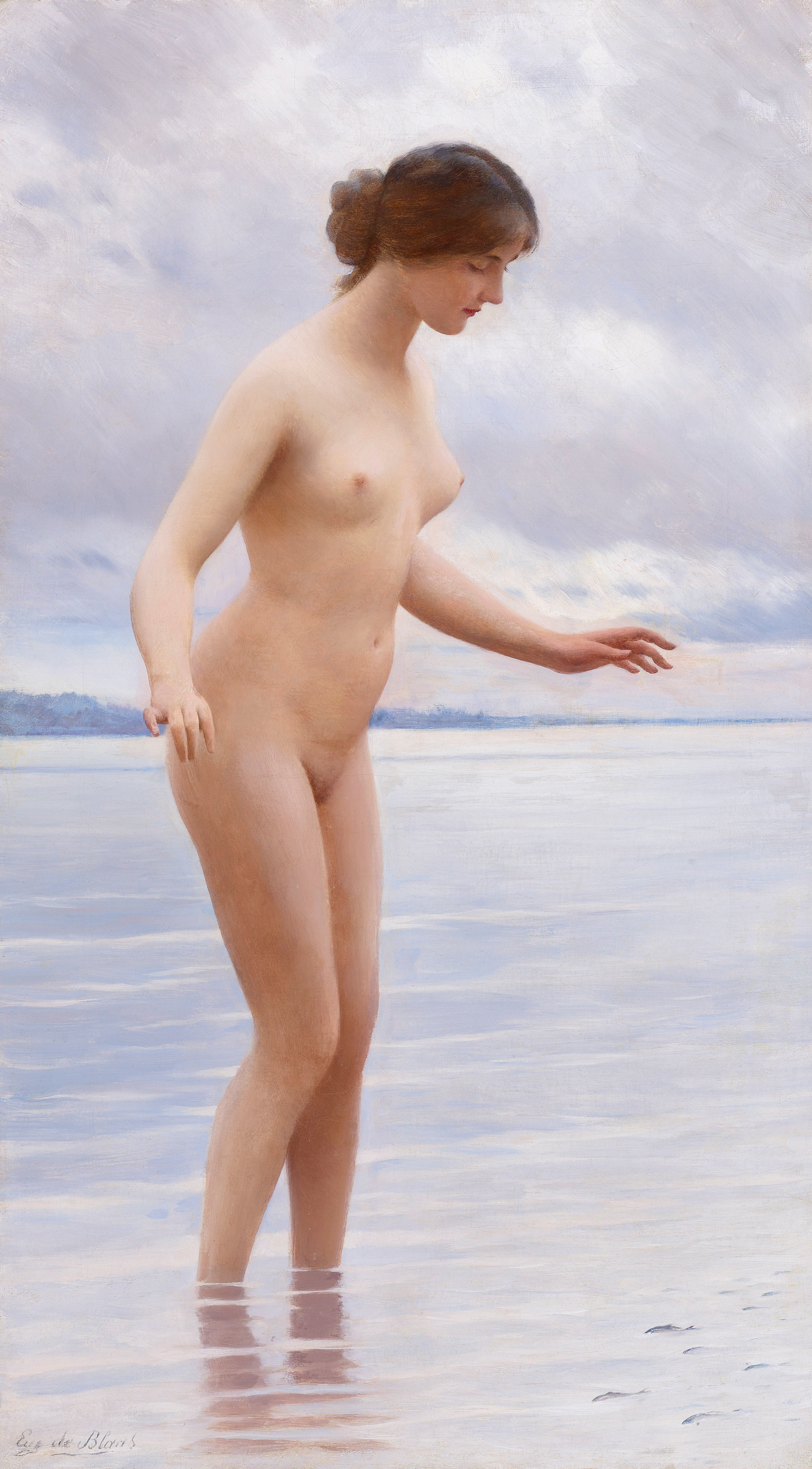
- Artist: Eugene de Blaas
- Year: 1914
- Type: Oil on cradled panel
- Dimensions: 78.4 cm × 44.5 cm (30.9 in × 17.5 in)
- Location: Private collection

In the Water (French: Dans l'Eau) is an oil painting on panel by Eugene de Blaas of a nude young woman. It is the only nude painting by de Blaas – all his other subjects are fully clothed. The picture measures 78.4 cm by 44.5 cm.

== Description ==
The painting depicts a naked young woman standing up to mid-ankle in water, leaning forward, looking down at a school of tiny fish. She has a rosy complexion, and her curly, dark brown hair is tied back.

Although there is no sun in the composition, golden light shines through the cloudy sky and reflects on the water. There is land in the background, with a patch of greenery to the right.

The artist signed his name and the date (1914) in dark ink, at the lower-left corner of the composition.
