= On the Beach (painting) =

Painting by Eugen von Blaas

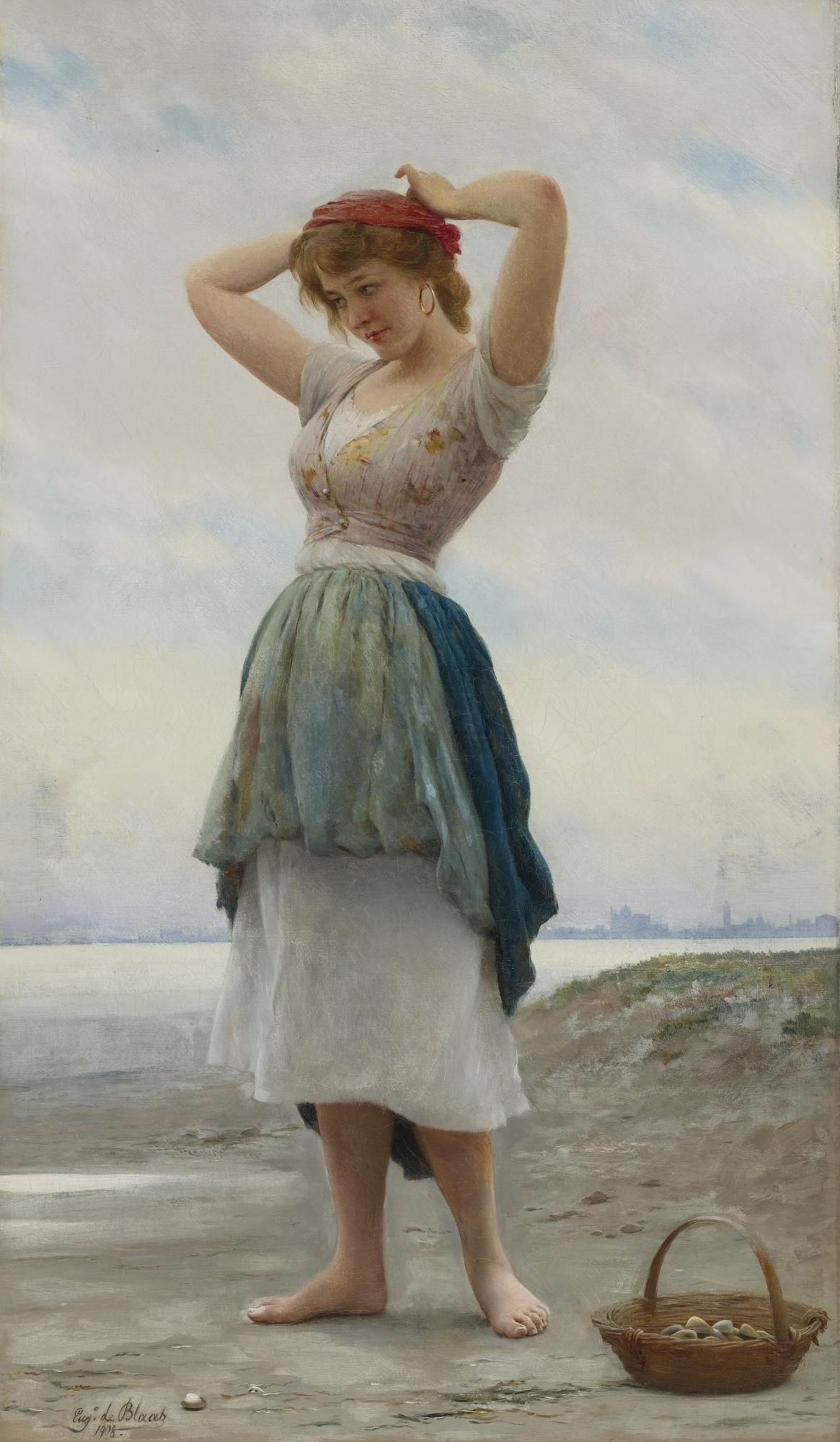
- Artist: Eugen von Blaas
- Year: 1908
- Medium: oil on canvas
- Dimensions: 73.7 cm × 43.2 cm (29.0 in × 17.0 in)
- Location: Private collection

On the Beach is a 1908 oil-on-canvas painting by the Italian painter Eugen de Blaas. It is held in a private collection.

== Description ==
This 43.2 by 73.7 centimetres (17.0 in × 29.0 in) oil painting was created by de Blaas in 1908. It depicts a clothed but barefoot woman. She is standing on a beach, and she places her hands behind her head. Next to her is a basket. The woman and the basket are detailed in contrast to the body of water behind her and the buildings on the distant shore.
