= Julius von Blaas =

Italian painter

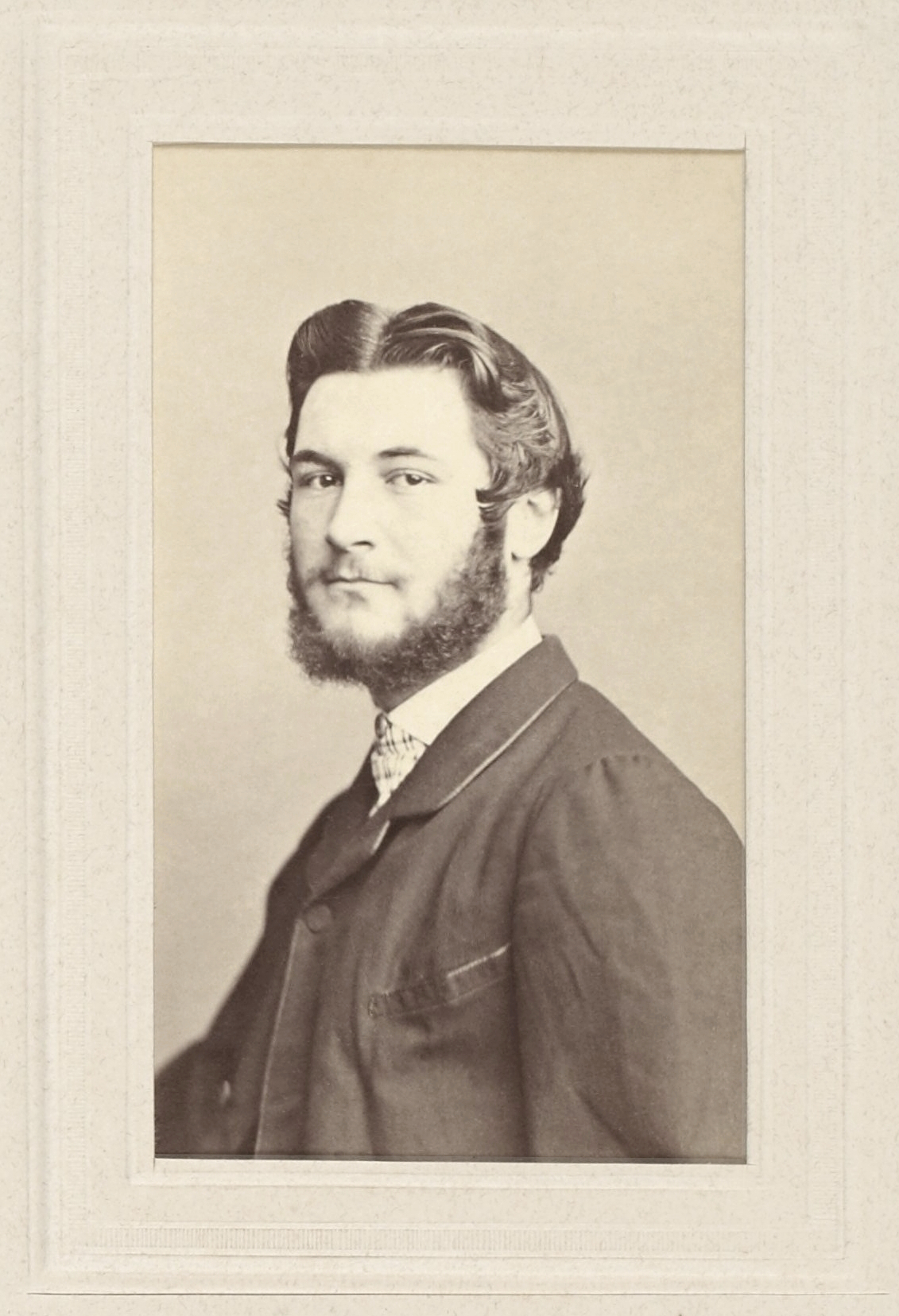
Julius von Blaas

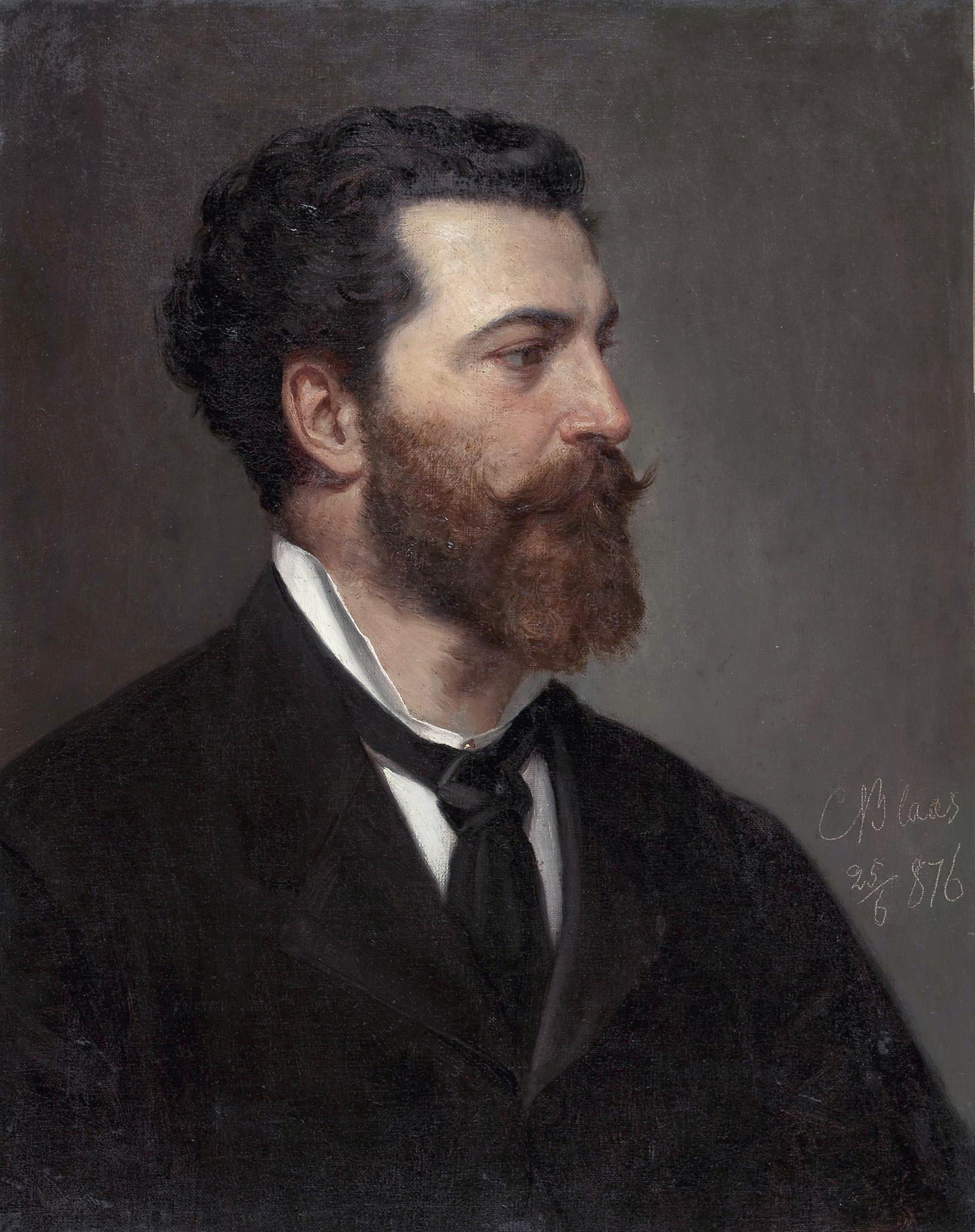
Julius von Blaas, by his father Karl von Blaas (1815-1894)

Julius von Blaas (1845–1923) was an Italian painter, the second son of Karl, born at Albano, Italy. He studied under his father, devoted himself principally to equestrian subjects, and went to Rome where he painted genre scenes from the Campagna. His "Race of Intoxicated Slavonic Peasants" (1869) is in the Imperial Museum of Vienna, as is "Antlassritt" (1899). Julius von Blaas was much employed by the Austrian court as a portrait painter and became professor in the Academy of Vienna.

== Paintings ==
- "Fox Hunt in the Campagna" (1877)
- "Market in Upper Hungary" (1885)
- "Horse Fair in Bischofshofen"' (1888)
- "Morning Training in the Winter Riding School" (1890)
