= Karl von Blaas =

Austrian painter (1815–1894)

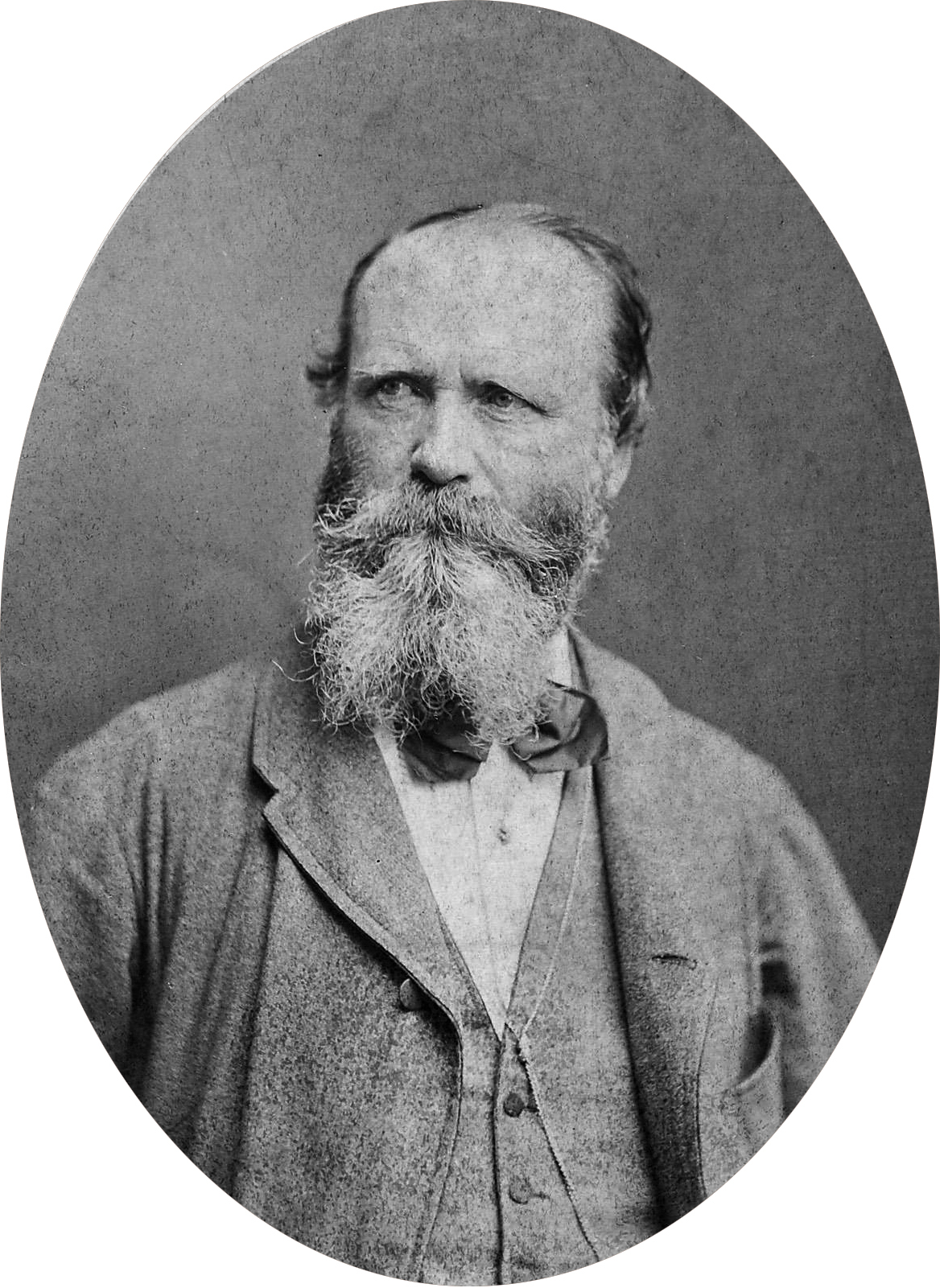
- Karl von Blaas
- Born: April 28, 1815; Nauders, Austrian Empire
- Died: March 19, 1894 (aged 78); Vienna, Austria-Hungary
- Known for: Painting

Karl von Blaas (28 April 1815 – 19 March 1894) was an Austrian painter known for his portraits and religious compositions executed on canvas as well as in the form of frescoes.

== Biography ==
Carl Von Blaas was born to a peasant family at Nauders in the Tyrol on 28 April 1815. His first art lessons were in Innsbruck, where he received an education as a writer. But he was more interested in art, and so, like many painters at the time, he aspired to visit Italy to realize his goal of an in-depth art education. His uncle, a judge in Verona, recognized his talent and gave him financial support for study in Venice, which he undertook in 1832. In his autobiography he recounts many of his adventures, some rather harrowing, on that sojourn. He was a student at the Venice Academy between 1832 and 1837, where he studied under Lodovico Lipparini. He won many awards and began to receive portrait commissions. In 1837 he received the Prix de Rome from the Venetian Academy, which allowed him to study in Rome for five years. He traveled there and during his visit came into contact with the leading member of the Nazarene School, German artist Friedrich Overbeck and his circle, who influenced him in many ways. However, he disagreed artistically with them and realized that his art aimed at more powerful and realistic compositions. While in Italy he traveled extensively, studying and copying many old master paintings. He then devoted himself to ecclesiastical art and genre scenes of ritual character, receiving many commissions for altarpieces and the like, including some at the behest of Pope Pius IX with whom he had a private audience as a result of his decoration of the Albano Cathedral. He also studied in Munich for two years and then painted commissioned works for churches in Paris, London, Italy, Hungary, and Russia.

In 1850 he was appointed to Academy of Vienna, and painted several frescoes in the Alt-Lerchenfeld church. In 1855 he received a prize at the Paris Exposition for his painting Charlemagne Visiting a Boys' School and accepted nomination as professor in the Venice Academy the same year. He was a professor of the Venice Academy from 1856 to 1866. In 1866 he returned to Vienna. His autobiography was published in Vienna in 1876. Von Blaas shared the Nazarene's fascination with Renaissance artists and identified with their view of the religious mission of art. He became well known in Vienna social circles and painted the boy emperor Franz Joseph in 1853. Some years later he began to execute forty two-fresco paintings for the Vienna Arsenal (now the Heeresgeschichtliches Museum) from Austria's history, which occupied him for eleven years. These are considered to be among his major works. He is the father of the genre painter Eugene von Blaas (1843–1942), whose reputation (and auction prices) has overshadowed that of his father, and Julius von Blaas (1845–1923), also a painter. He died in Vienna in 1894. Among his pupils was Francesco Beda.

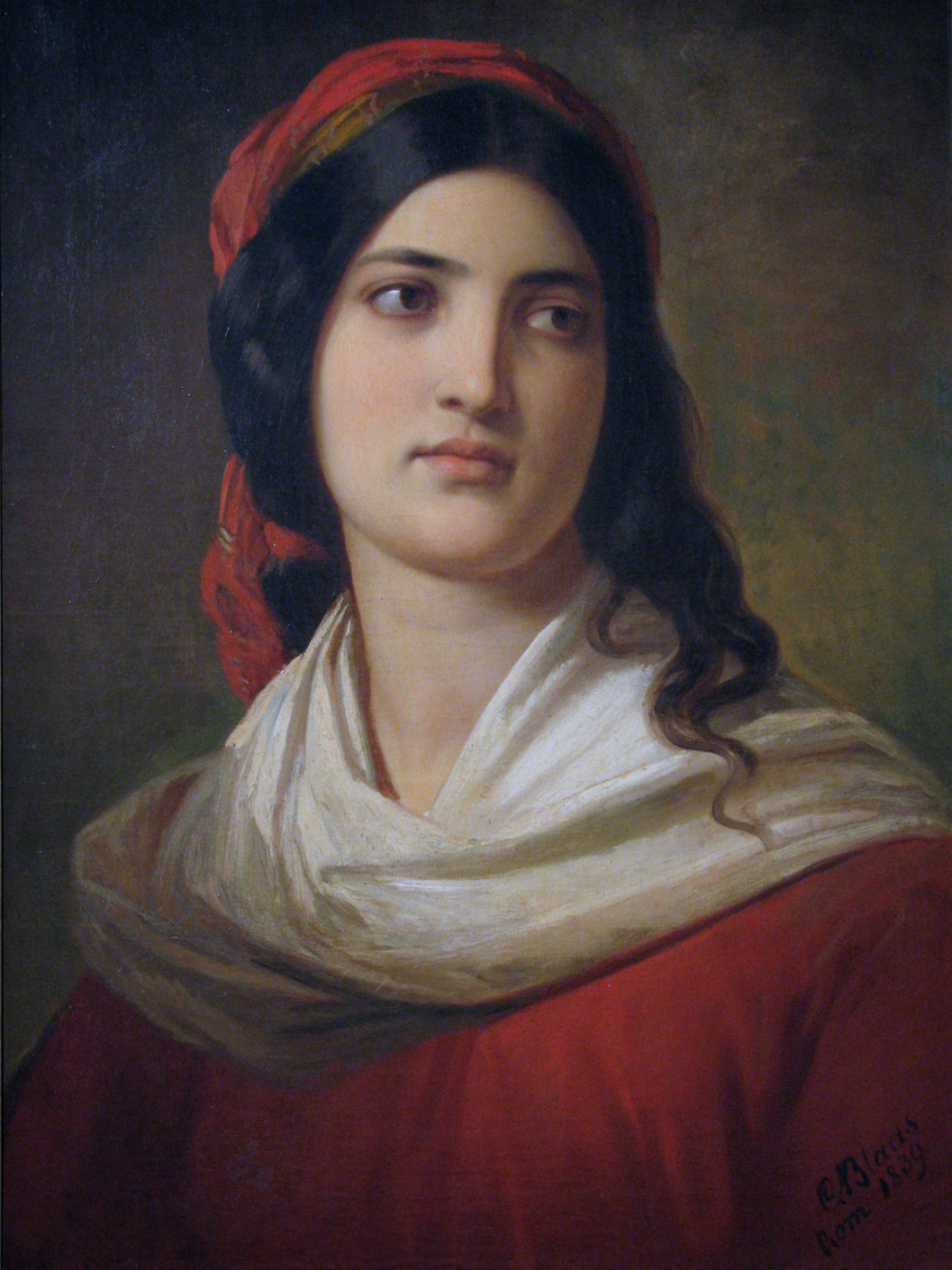
Portrait of Laura Bernabo (1839) (Private collection)

In his autobiography he recounts the following charming story, which took place in the summer of 1839 during a visit to Perugia:

"One Sunday in the Perugia Cathedral I saw a beautiful young woman, who made me forget the Mass and the holy environment. Back at the guesthouse I sketched her from memory, and the landlord said right away, “That is the beautiful Bernabo girl!” She was like the noble Lina, and as a result I drew her with a lot of spirit. In the evening on the Promenade I saw her again, and she attracted me like some invisible power. And as she walked into a narrow street, I asked her mother if I could paint her beautiful daughter. I told her I was an itinerant artist, seeking beauty wherever I found it. The lady was not offended or unkind, and let me into her house. For days I visited her and the portrait was painted. The beautiful Laura felt herself flattered, and although I wanted to be steadfast in my feelings, and to concern myself only with art and beautiful forms, she grabbed my heart. I soon had no other thoughts but those of Laura. As I often came to the house, she waited at the window and greeted me, and it was clear that she was glad to see me. Her mother, who was a widow and only had one daughter, also noted the mutual affection. We agreed that we would meet each other daily, early at 5:00 AM, by a fresh well where a nice path went by, naturally to the accompaniment of her mother. This happened very often and we drank of the healthy water and chatted. These were marvelous, unforgettable morning hours. Her mother desired that her beautiful but poor daughter be well married, and so spoke one day, when I had completed the portrait, very earnestly with me, whereupon I described my circumstances, and had to express my regrets, because I could make no pledge, due to the fact that I was yet so young and I must establish a livelihood. Laura could not be expected to wait for an indefinite period, when I had achieved that goal. The young woman wept and went sobbing into another room. Her mother praised my honesty and regretted likewise that I was not well-off. During this conversation I had come again to my senses and determined that I had to leave." (Autobiography, pp. 136–138)

The portrait of Laura Bernabo from this passage is shown here. In 1842 Von Blaas married another Italian woman, Agnesina Ajuda, whom he met in Albano in 1840.

== Paintings ==
- "Jacob's Journey through the Desert" (Museum of Venice)
- "Visitation" (Innsbruck Museum)
- "Charlemagne Visiting a Boys' School" (Venice Museum)
- "Tullia Driving over her Father's Body" (1832)
- "Rape of Venetian Brides in Sixth Century" (1858); Innsbruck Museum)
- "Ekkehard Carrying the Duchess of Suabia across the Threshold of the Monastery"

== Works ==
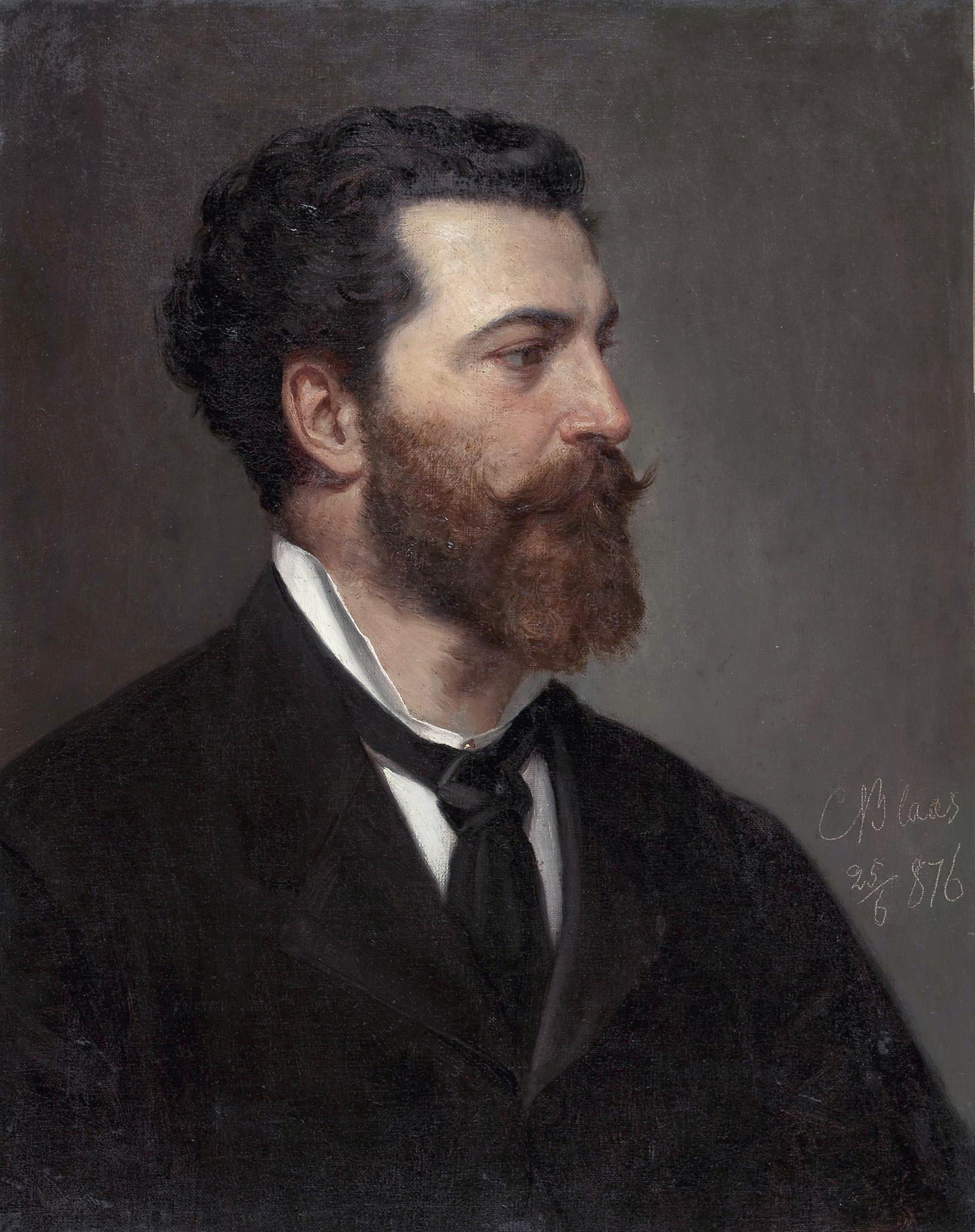
Julius von Blaas by Carl von Blaas

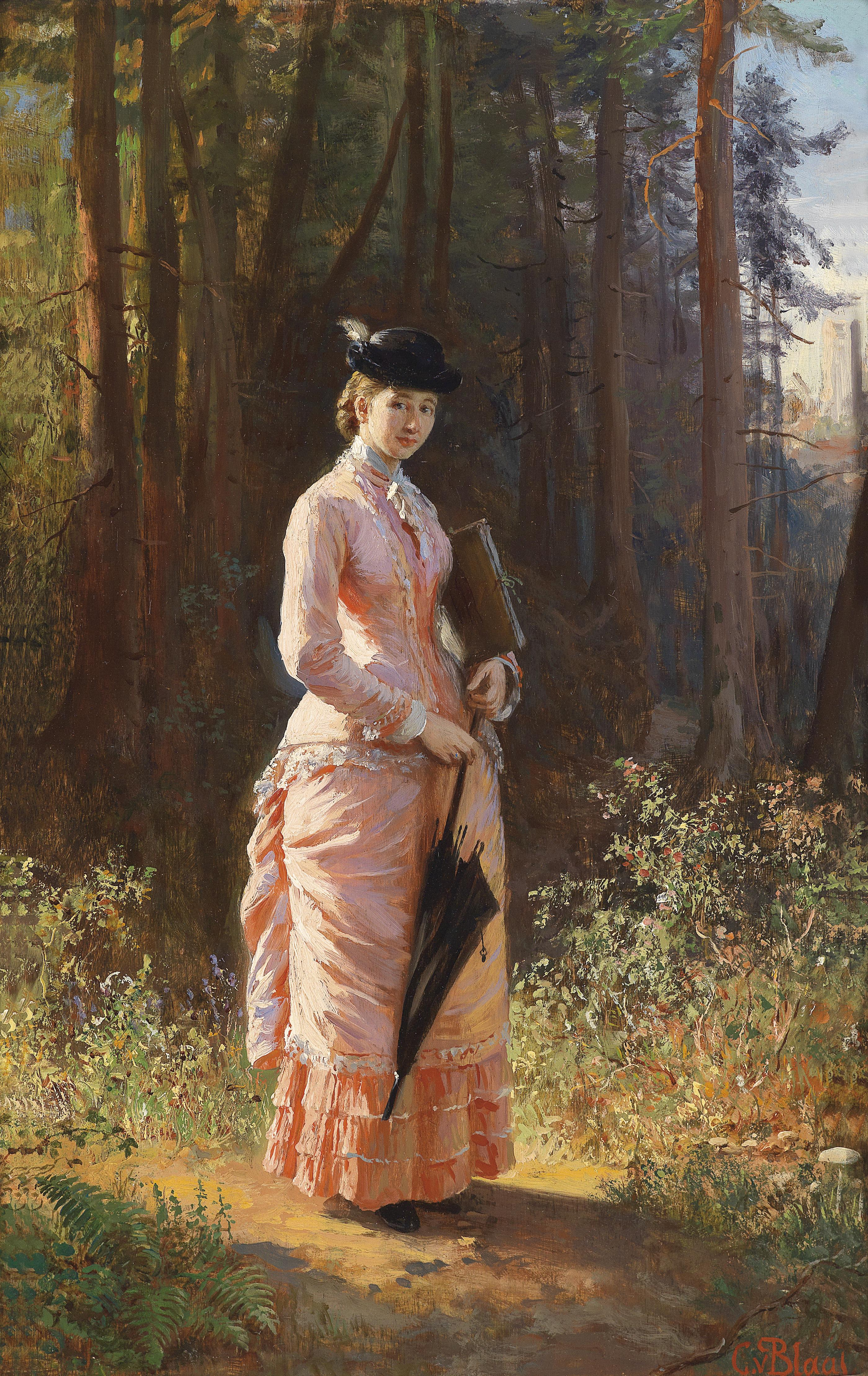
Lady walking

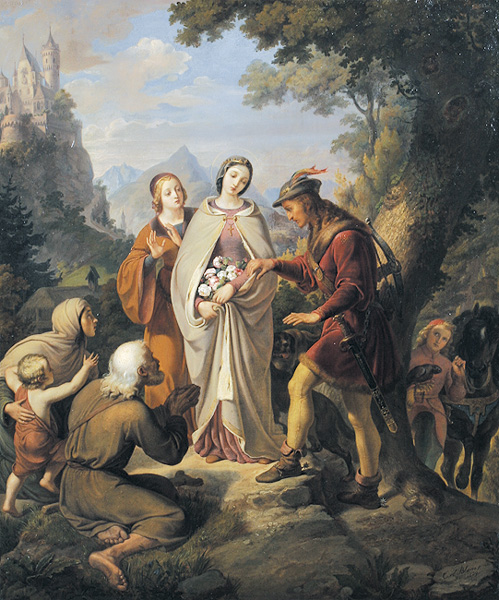
Miracle of the Roses

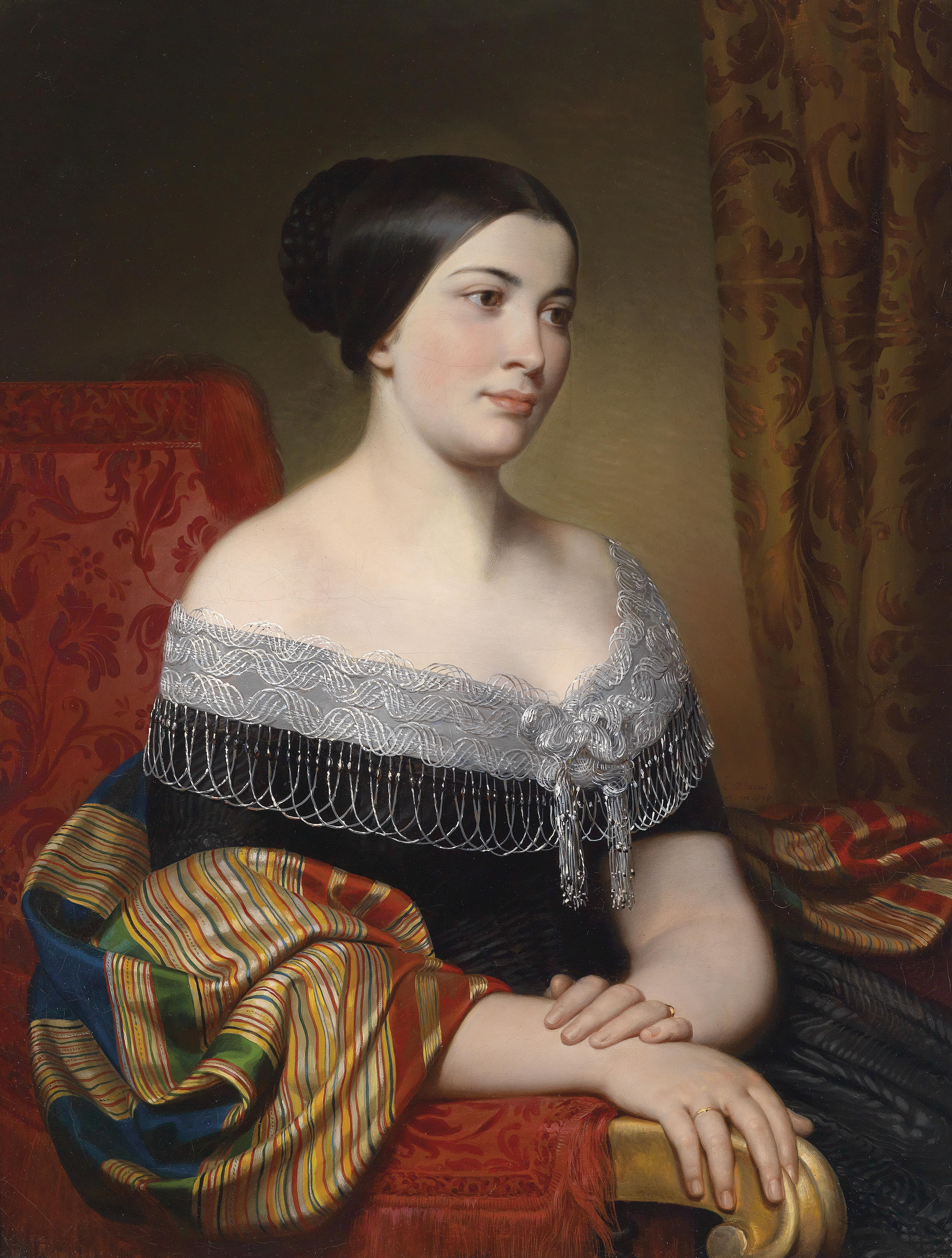
Portrait of a woman

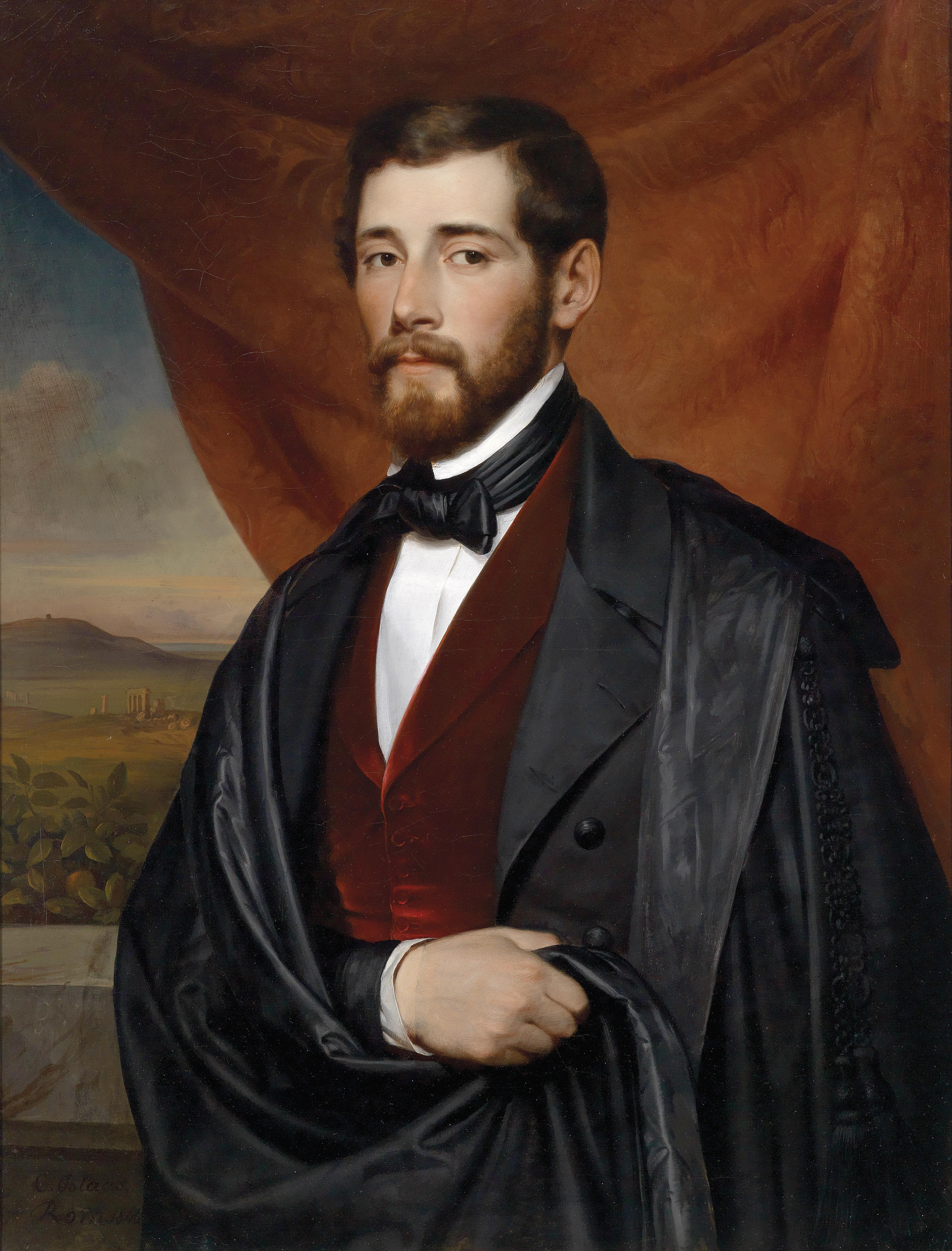
Portrait of a man

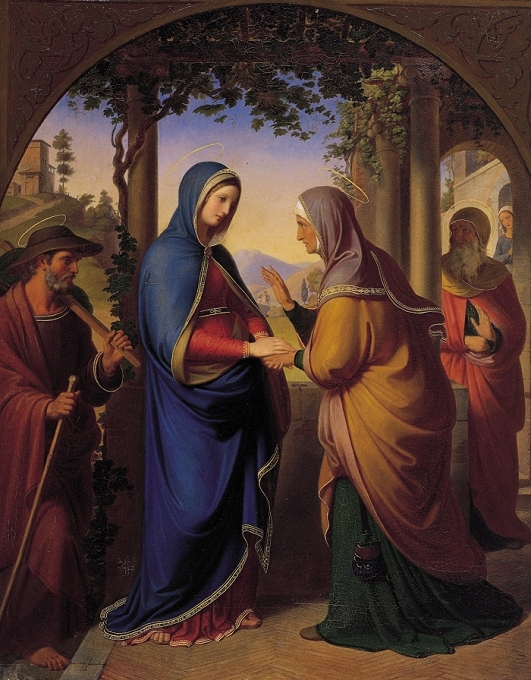
The Visitation, from the Sammellust gallery, Tiroler Landesmuseum Ferdinandeum, Innsbruck

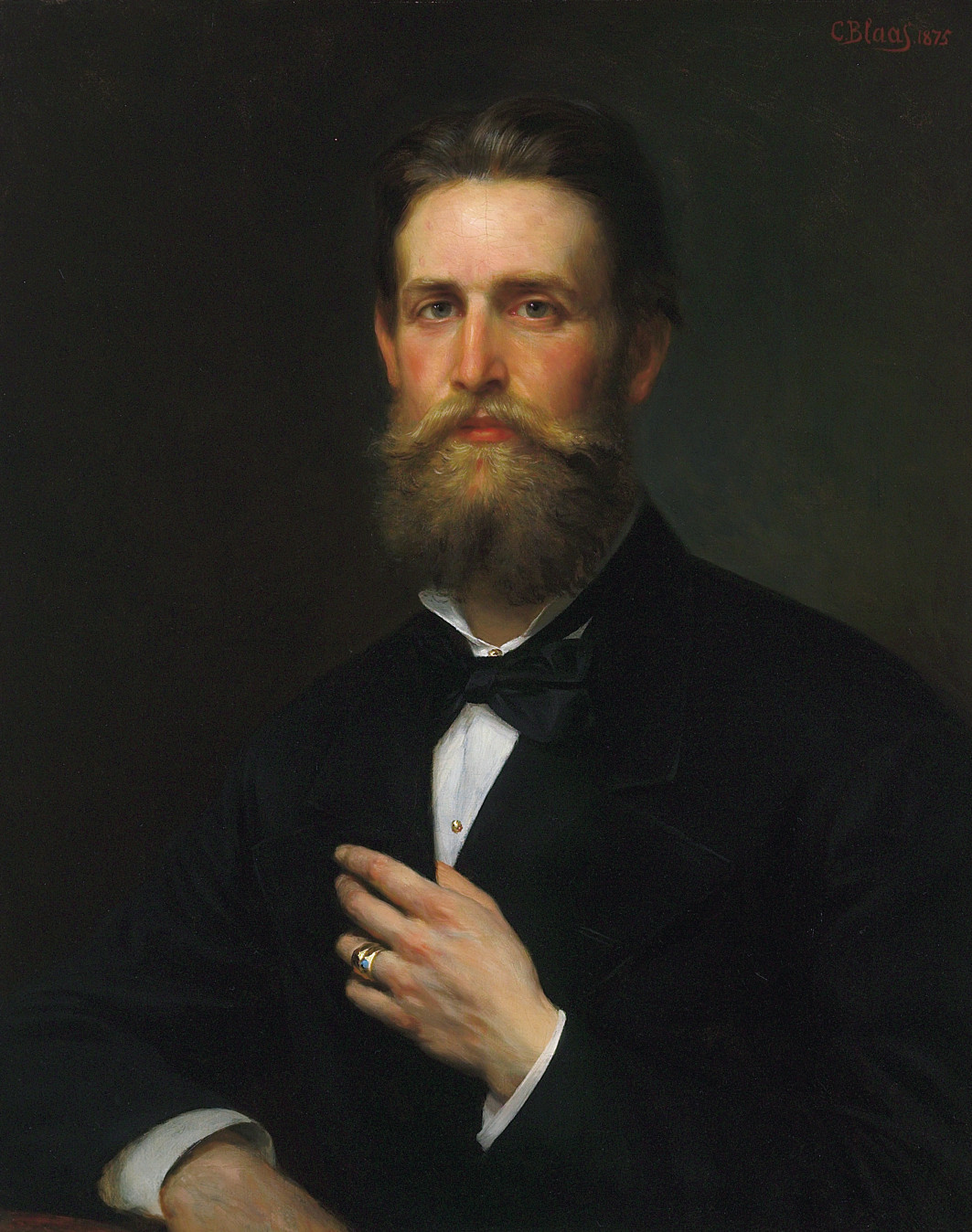
Portrait of Joseph Carl Achaz Freiherr von Doblhoff
