= Eugene de Blaas =

Italian painter (1843–1931)

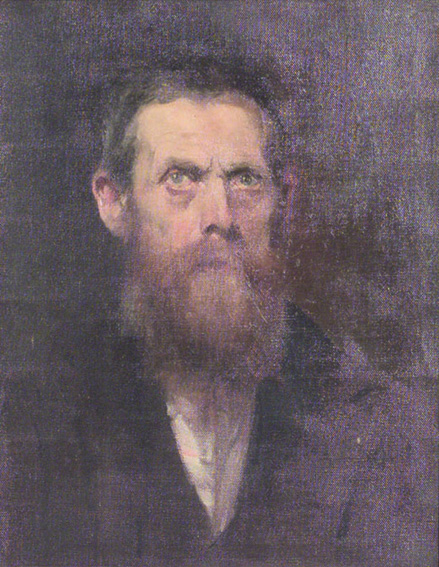
- Self portrait
- Born: 24 July 1843; Albano, Italy
- Died: 10 February 1931 (aged 87)
- Other names: Eugene von Blaas; Eugenio Blaas
- Father: Karl von Blaas

Eugene de Blaas, also known as Eugene von Blaas or Eugenio Blaas (24 July 1843 – 10 February 1931), was an Italian painter in the school known as Academic Classicism.

== Life and career ==
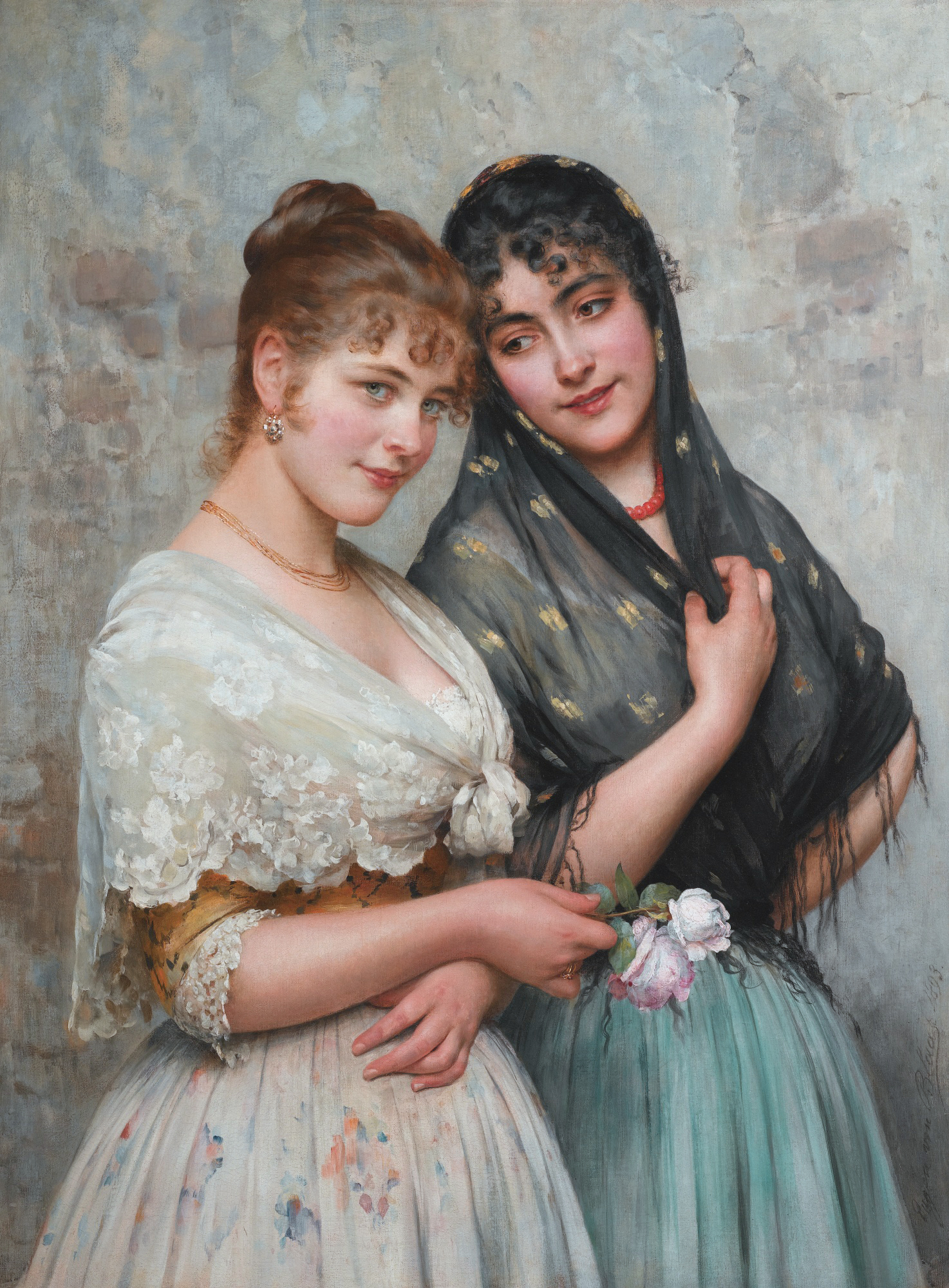
Two Venetian Women

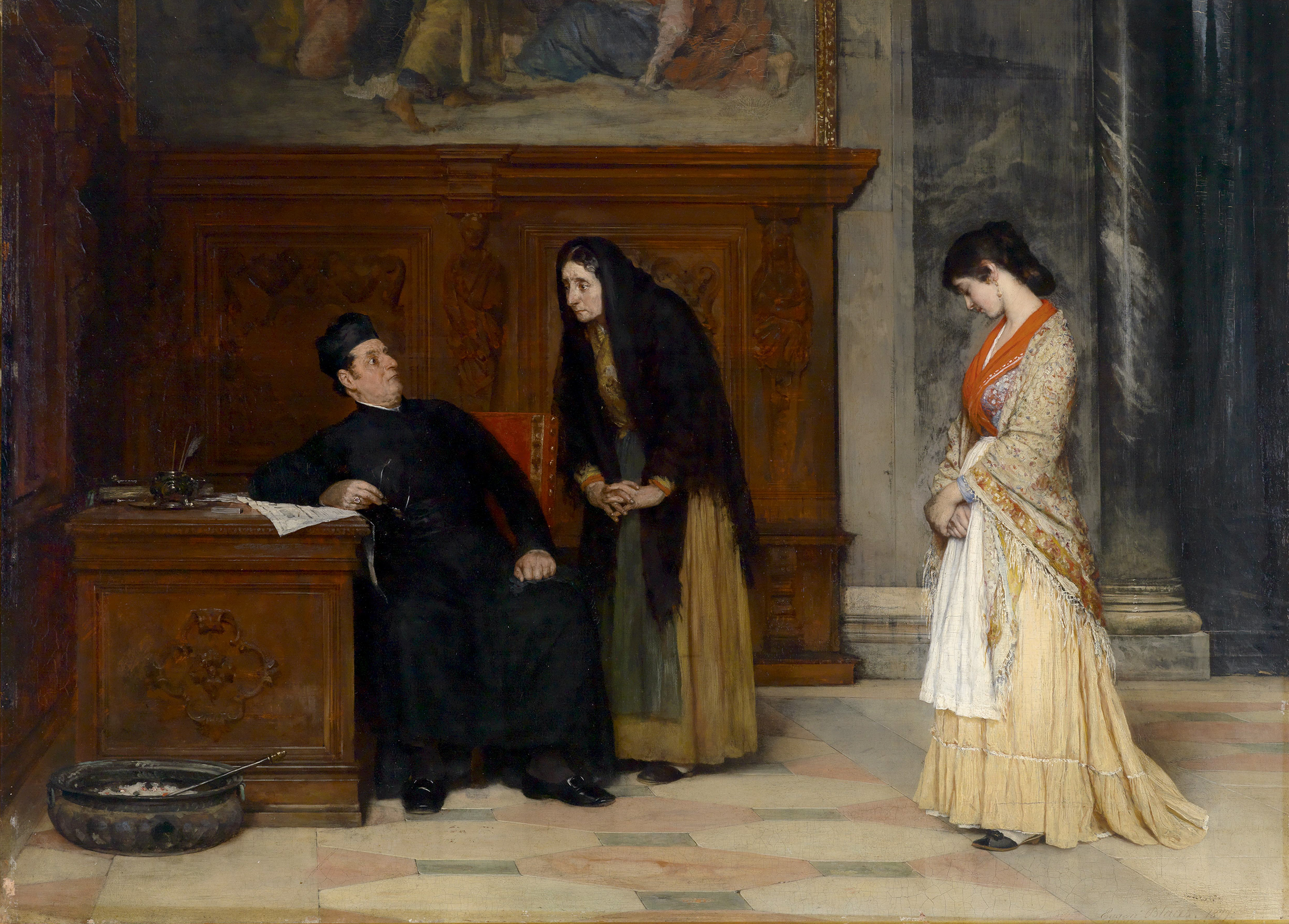
In the Sacristy, 1877

He was born at Albano, near Rome, to a Tyrolean father and Italian mother. His father Karl, also a painter, was his teacher. His mother, Agnesina Auda, was a well-to-do Roman woman. The family moved to Venice when Karl became professor at the Academy of Venice. He often painted scenes in Venice, but also portraits and religious paintings.

== Works ==
Among his works are La forma nuziale in sacrestia; La tombola in Campiello a Venezia; Una scena di burattini in un educandato; and La Ninetta. The art critic Luigi Chirtani, when the painting was displayed at the Mostra Nazionale di Venezia, described it as "[b]eautiful, flattering, pretty, caressed, cleaned, polished, laundress in a painting by Mr. Blaas, the favorite portraitist of great Venetian aristocrats, dressed in gala satins, shining jewelry, hairstyles of the rich."

His colorful and rather theatrical period images of Venetian society, e.g. On the Balcony (1877; Private Collection), were quite different compared to delicate pastels and etchings of the courtyards, balcony and canals of modern Venice.

Eugene de Blaas' paintings were exhibited at the Royal Academy, Fine Art Society, New Gallery and Arthur Tooth and Sons Gallery in London, and also at the Walker Art Gallery in Liverpool.

The Austrian painter Marie Wunsch was his student.

== Paintings ==
- The Sisters 1878 (Cloister-Scene)
- Conversions of the Rhætians by St. Valentine
- Cimabue and Giotto
- Scene from the Decameron
- Dogaressa Going to Church
- Venetian Balcony Scene
- God's Creatures
- Bridal Procession, in San Marco
- Venetian Masquerade
- A Young Beauty (1882)
- A Journey to Murano (Vienna Museum)
- Die Wasserträgerin (1887)
- On the Beach (1908)
- In the Water (1914)
- Maiden gathering flowers
- Little Italian girl

=== Works ===
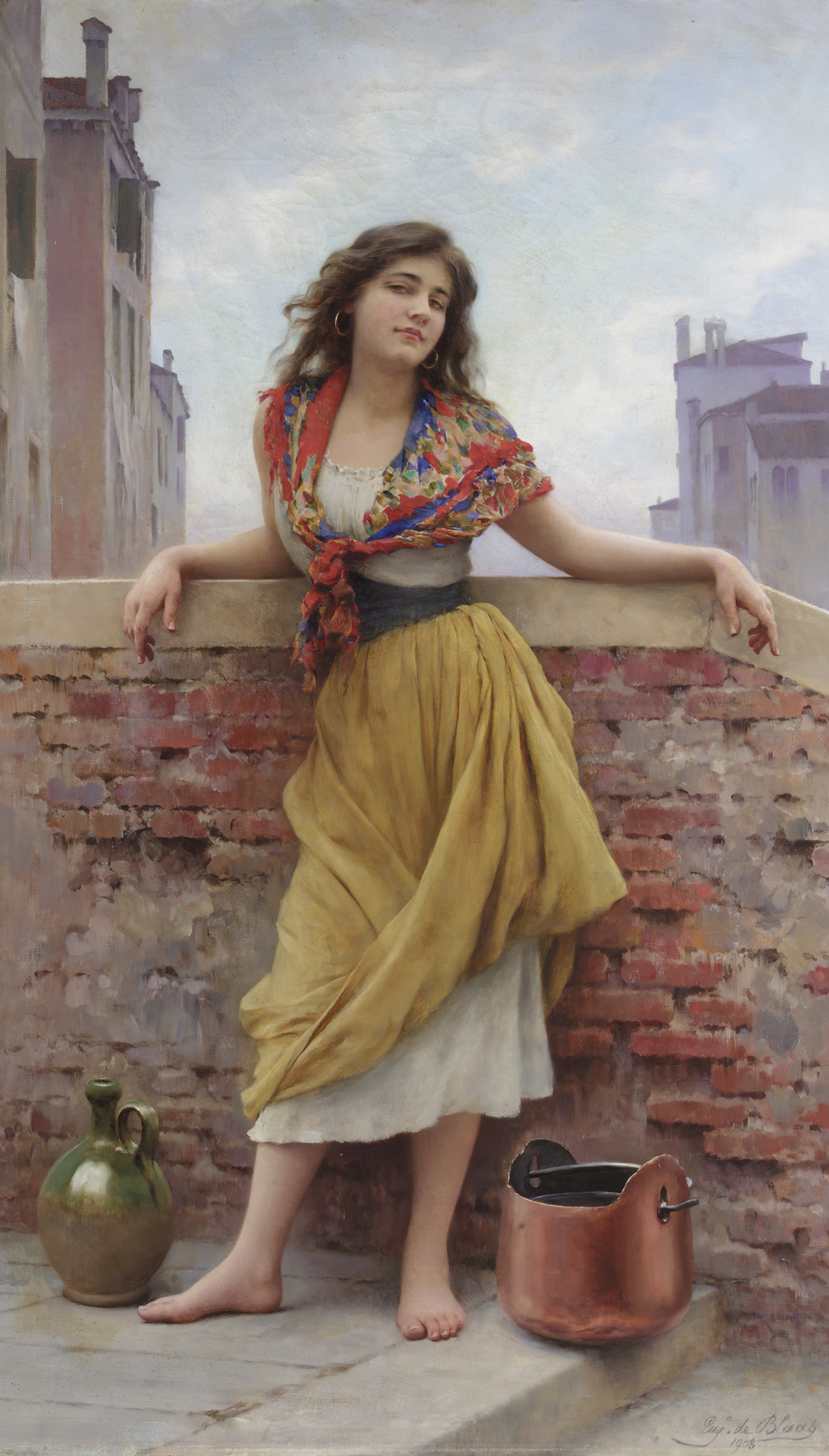
The Watercarrier

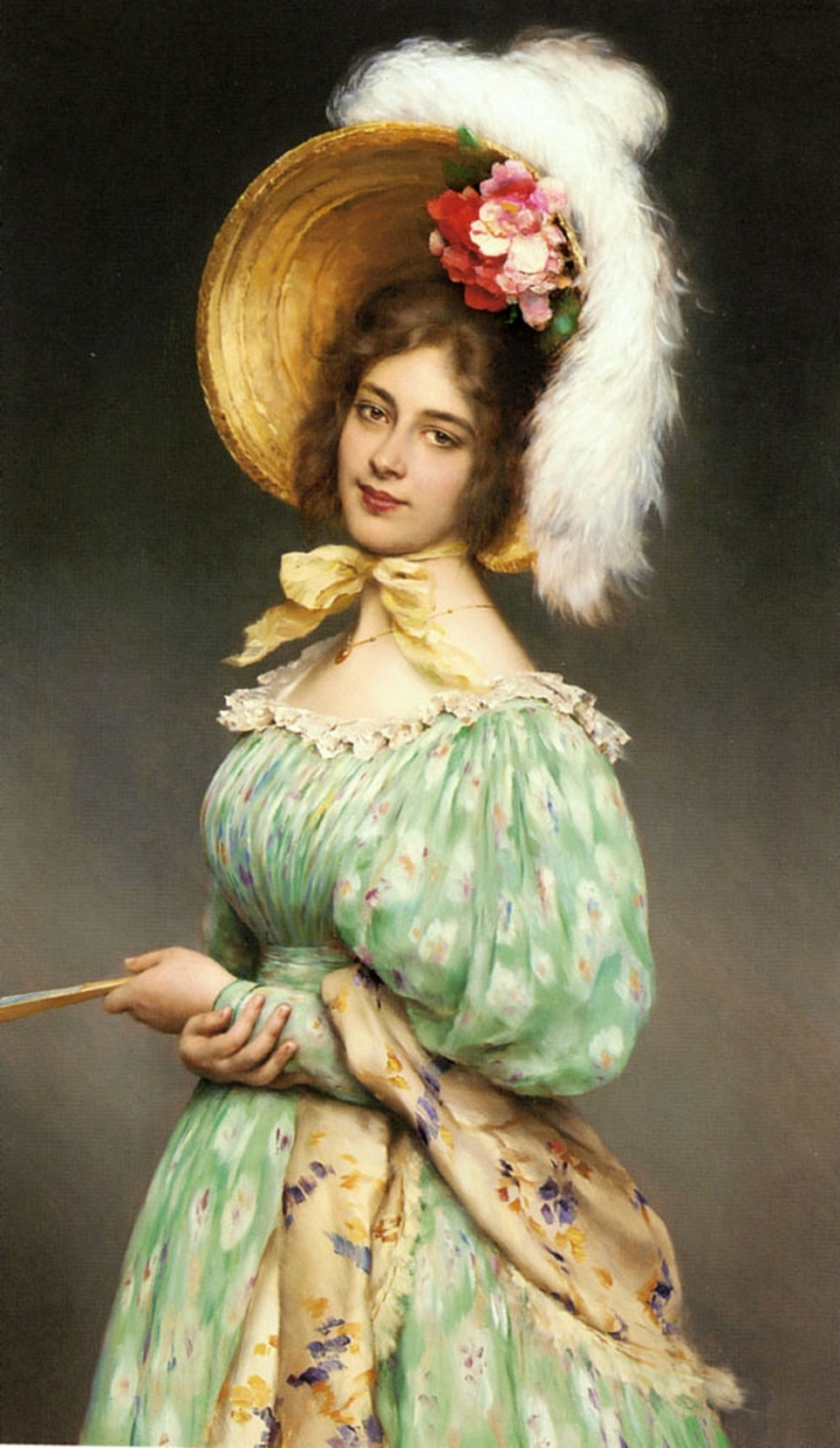
De Musette

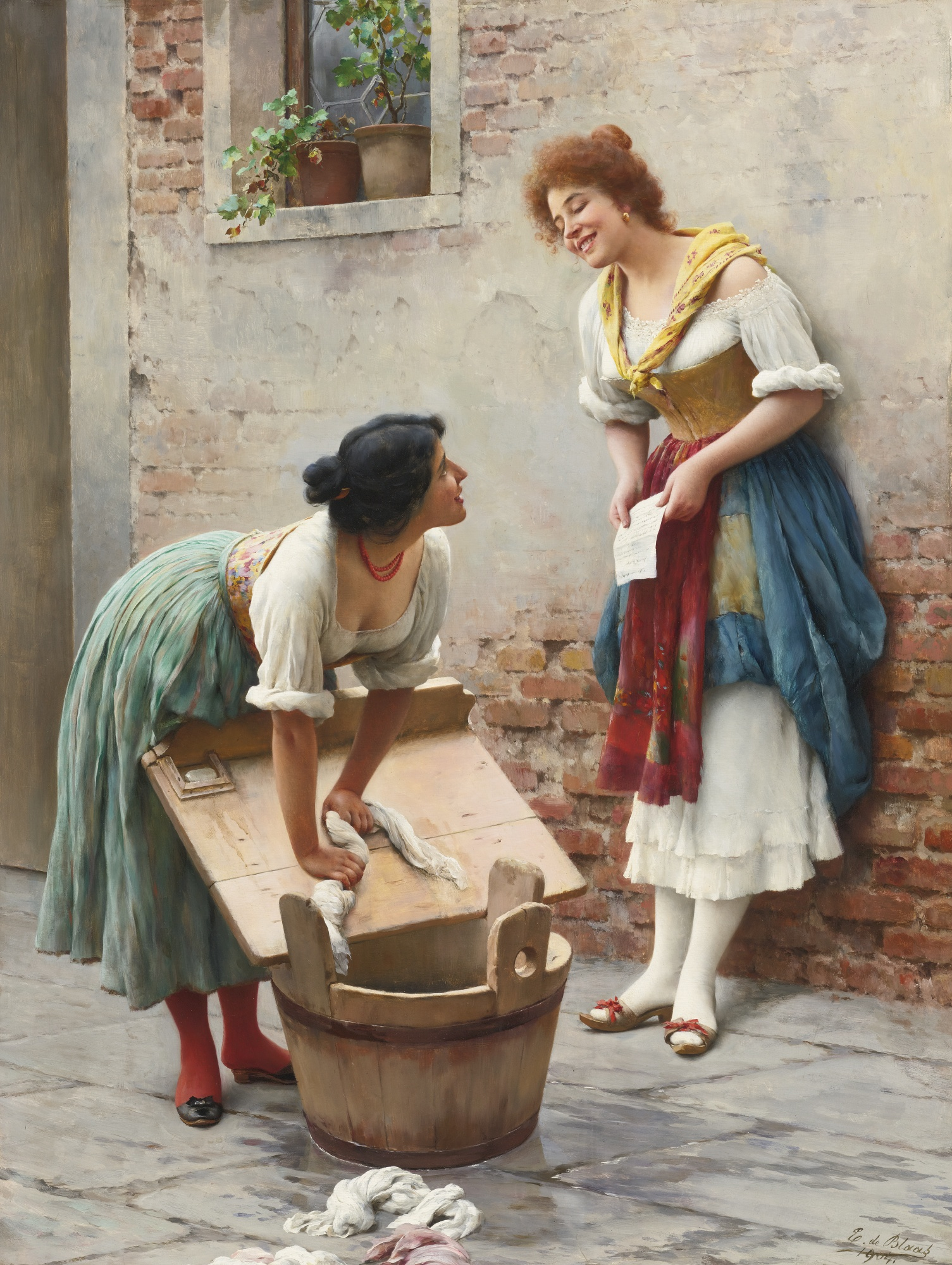
Sharing the News

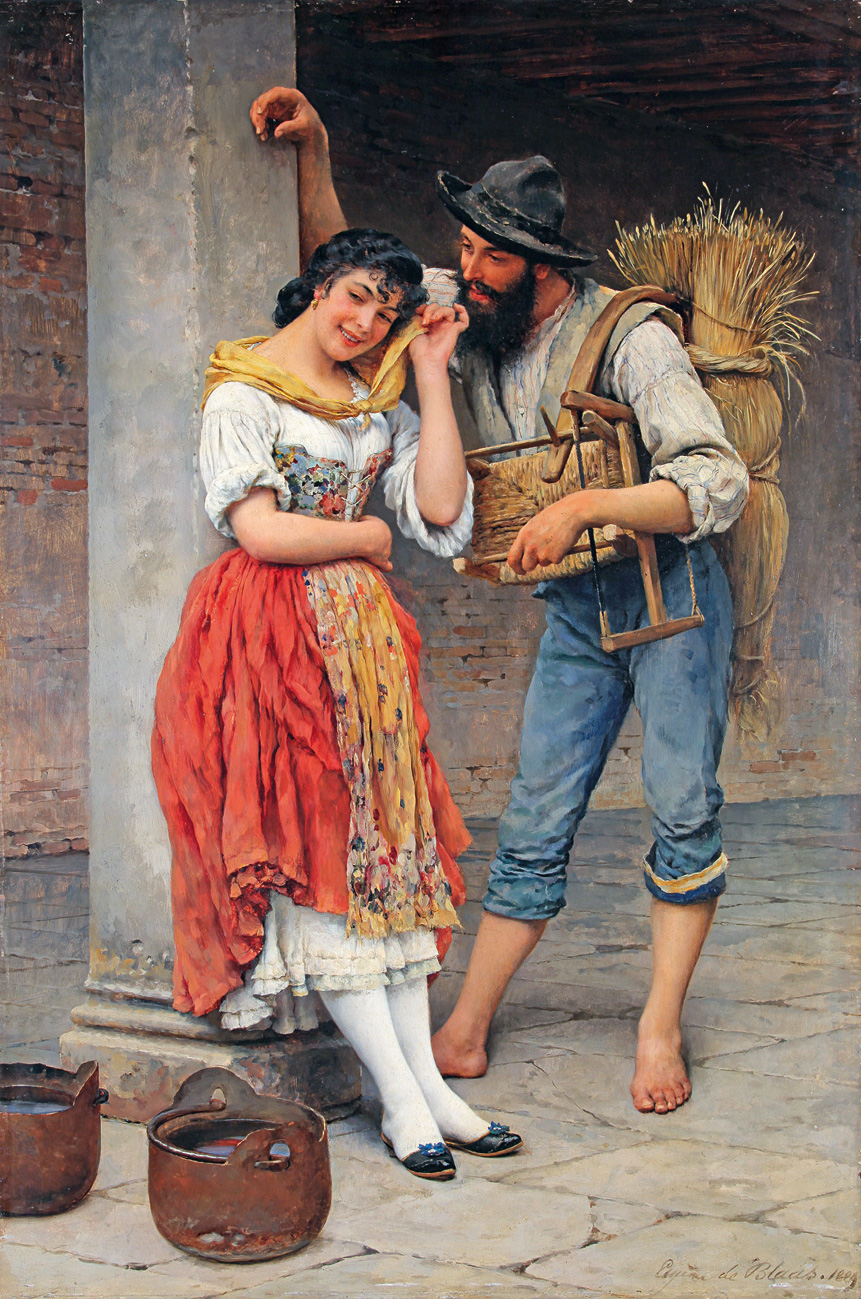
The Spider and the Fly

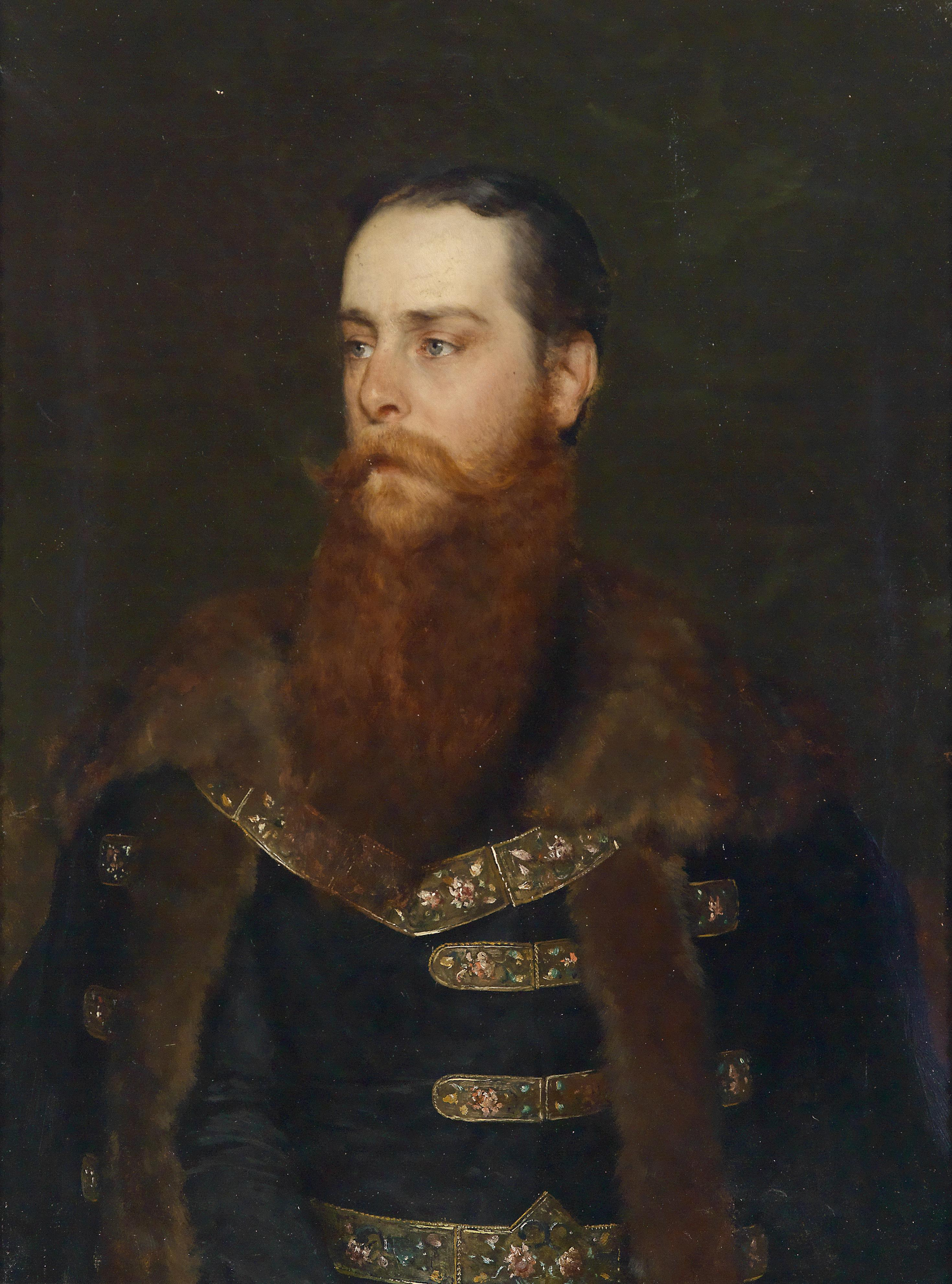
Arthur Graf Berchtold

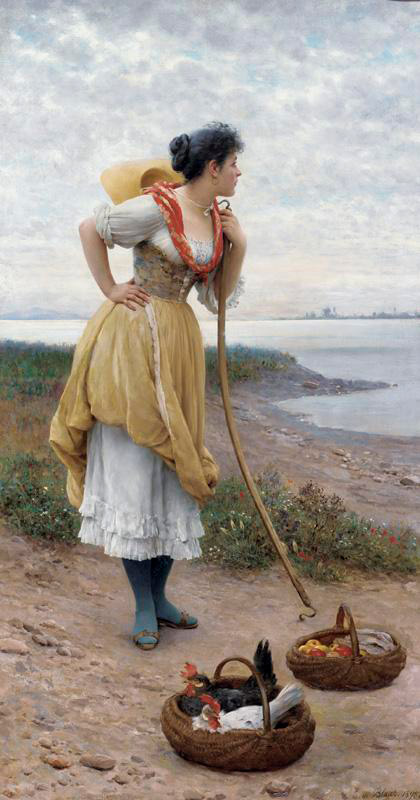
Daydreaming

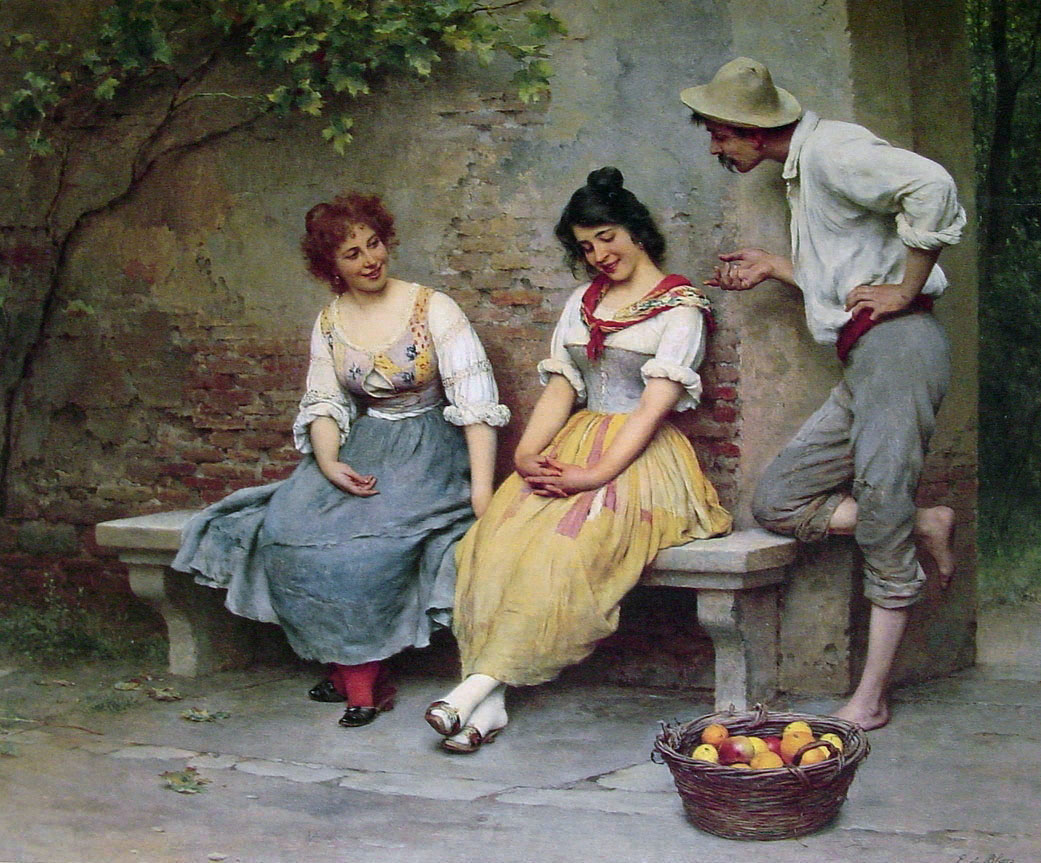
The Flirtation

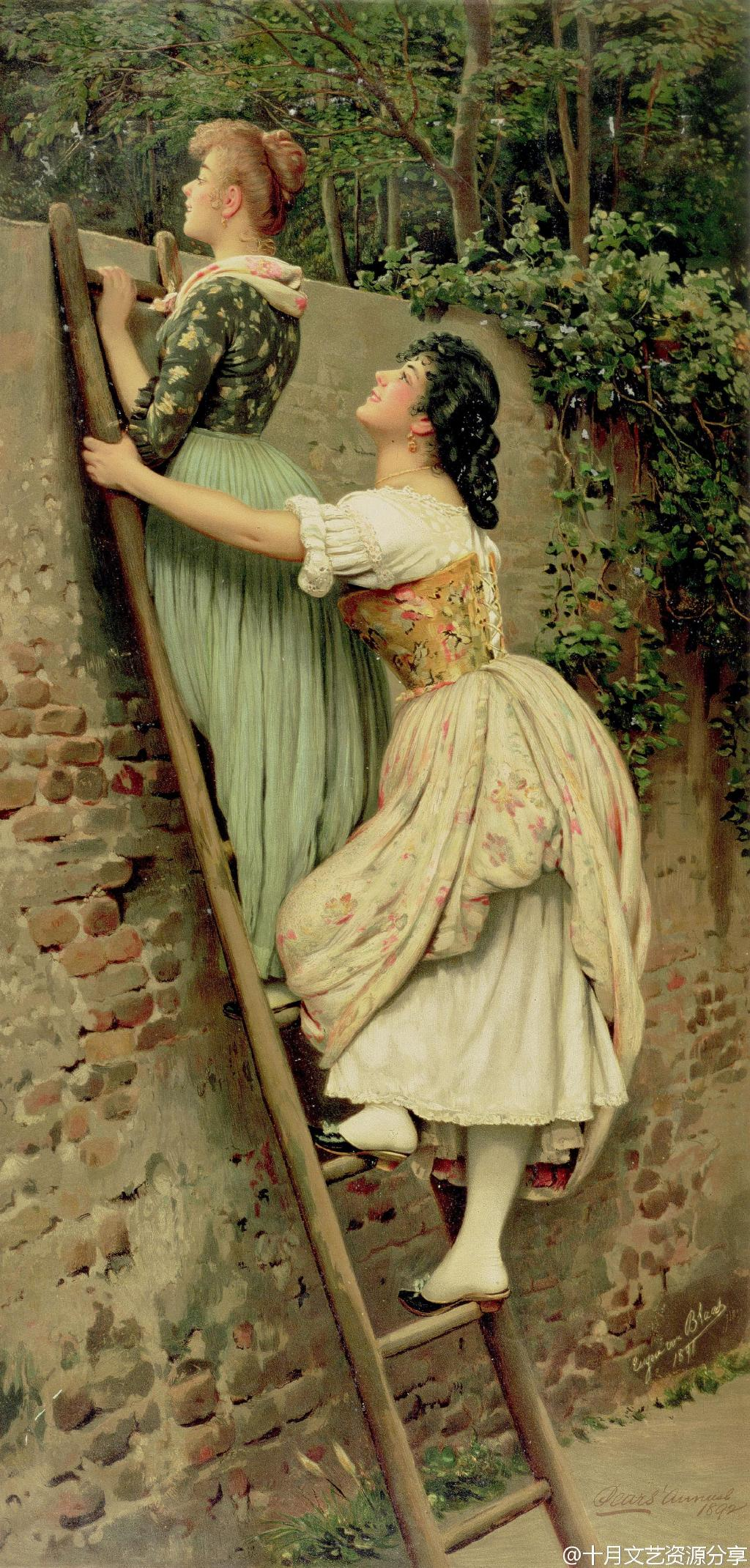
Curiosity

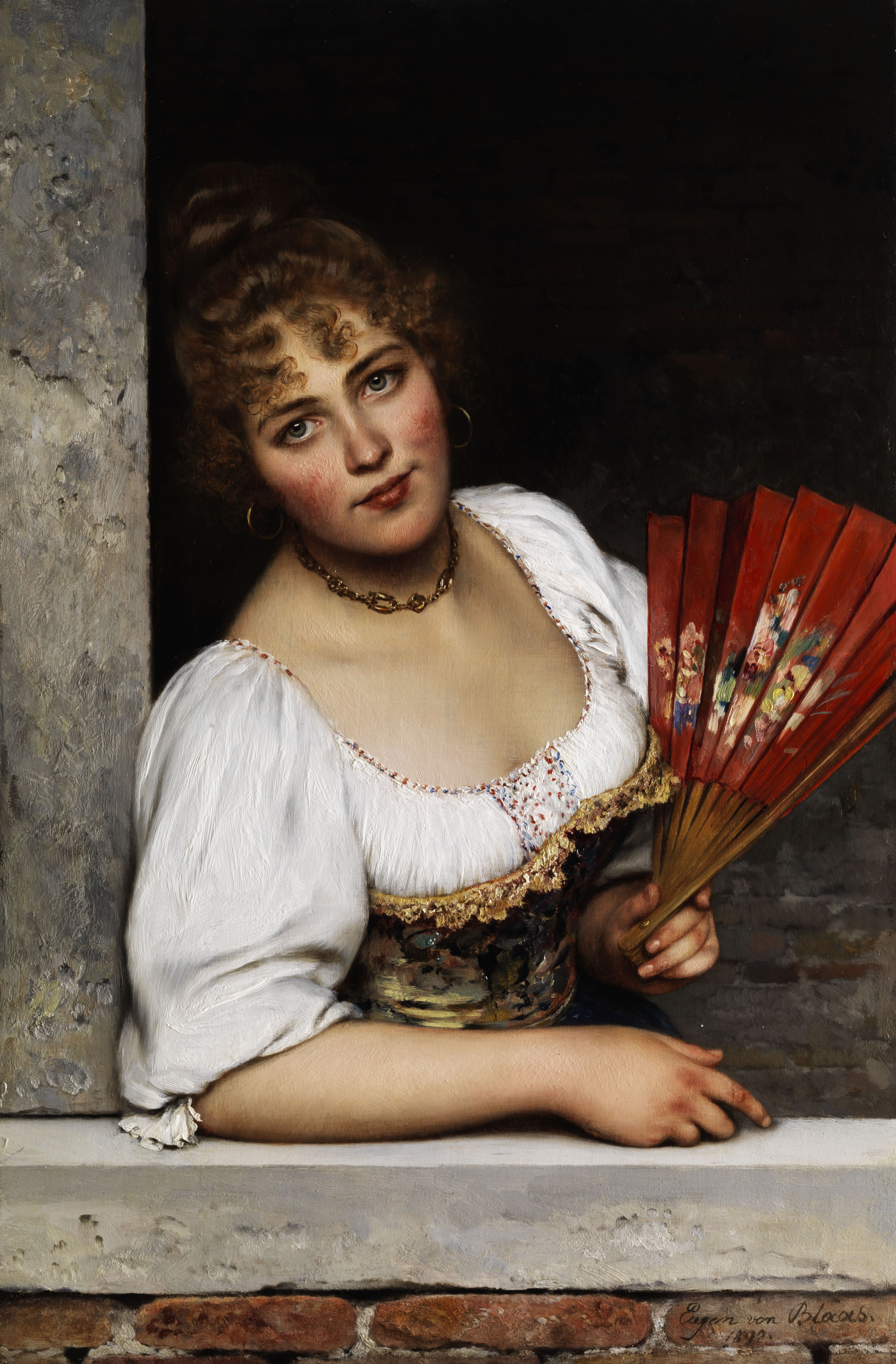
The Red Fan

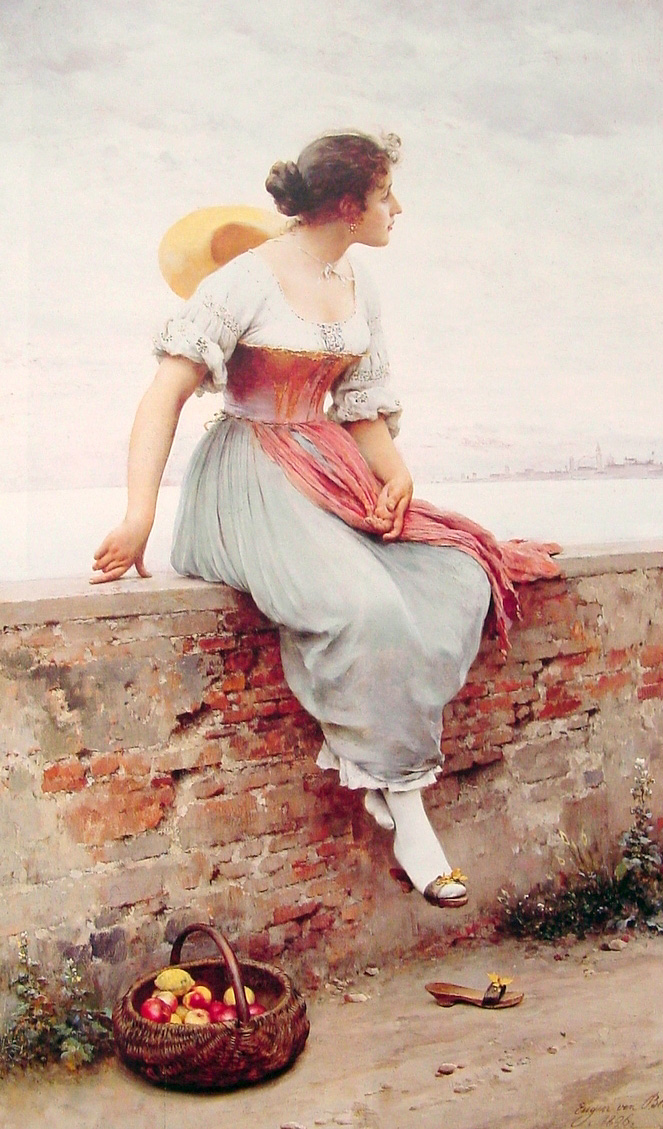
A Pensive Moment

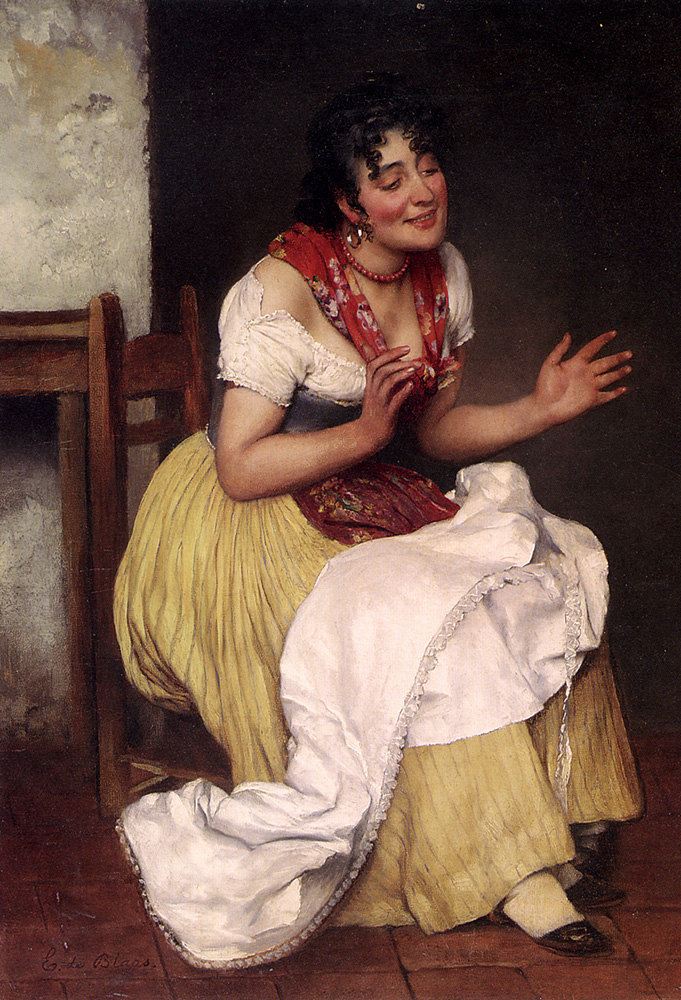
An interesting Story

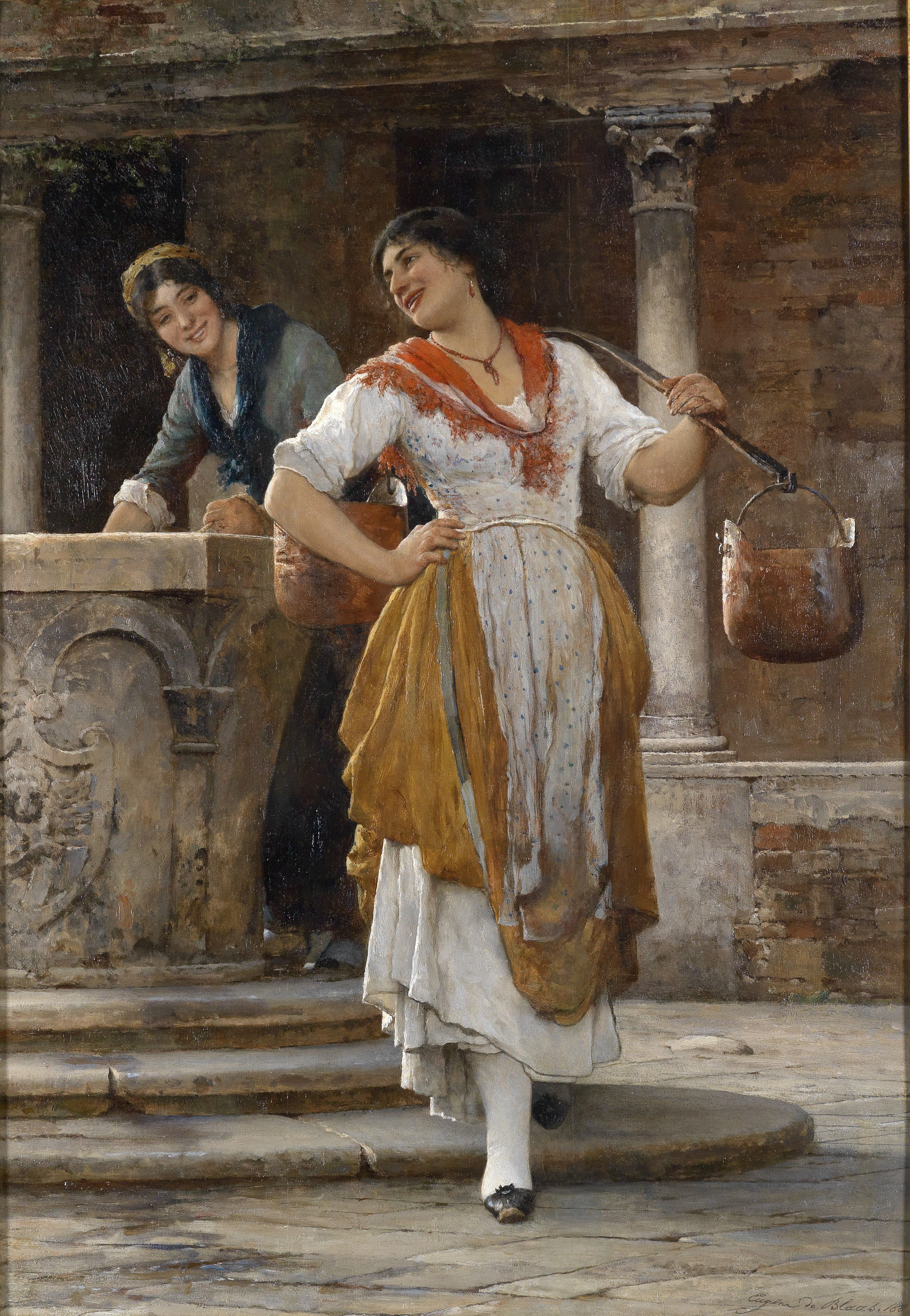
The Water Carrier

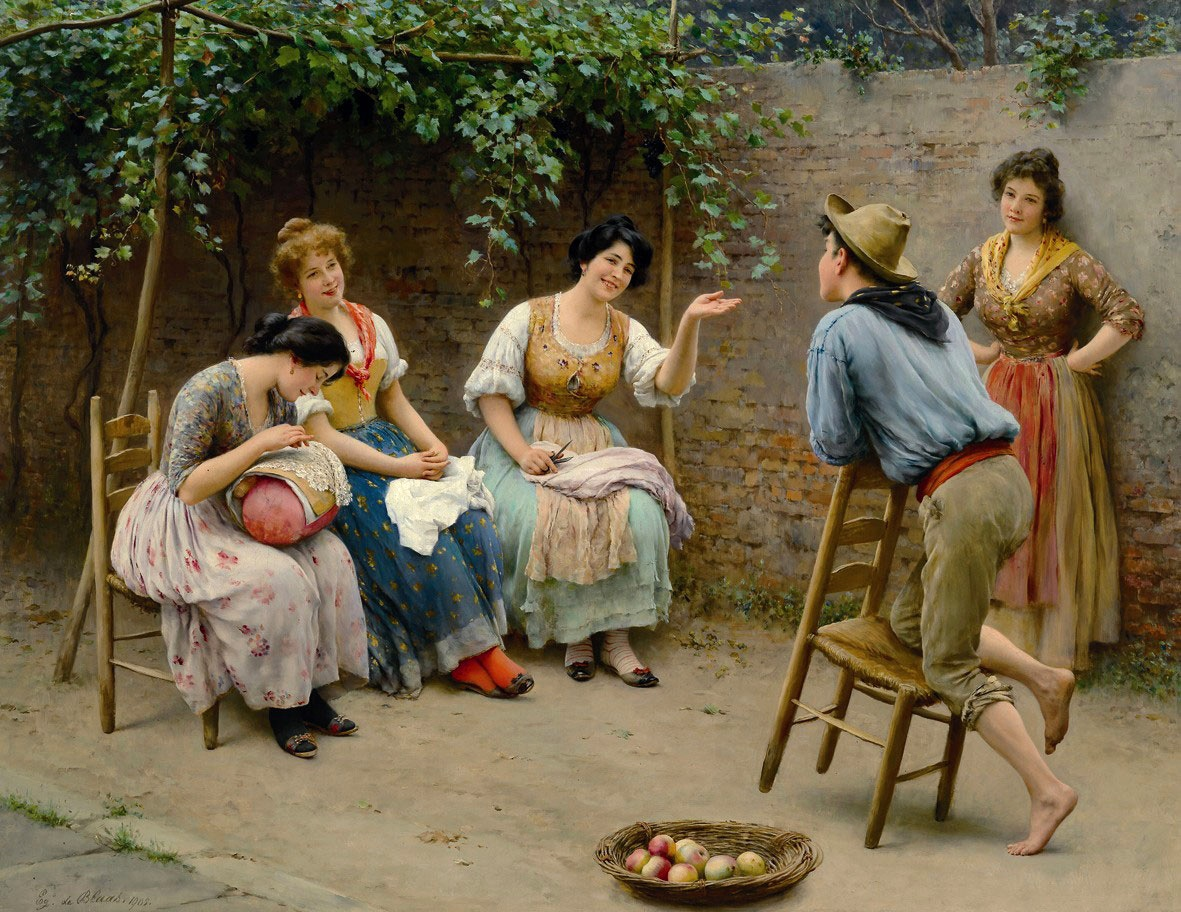
Chat

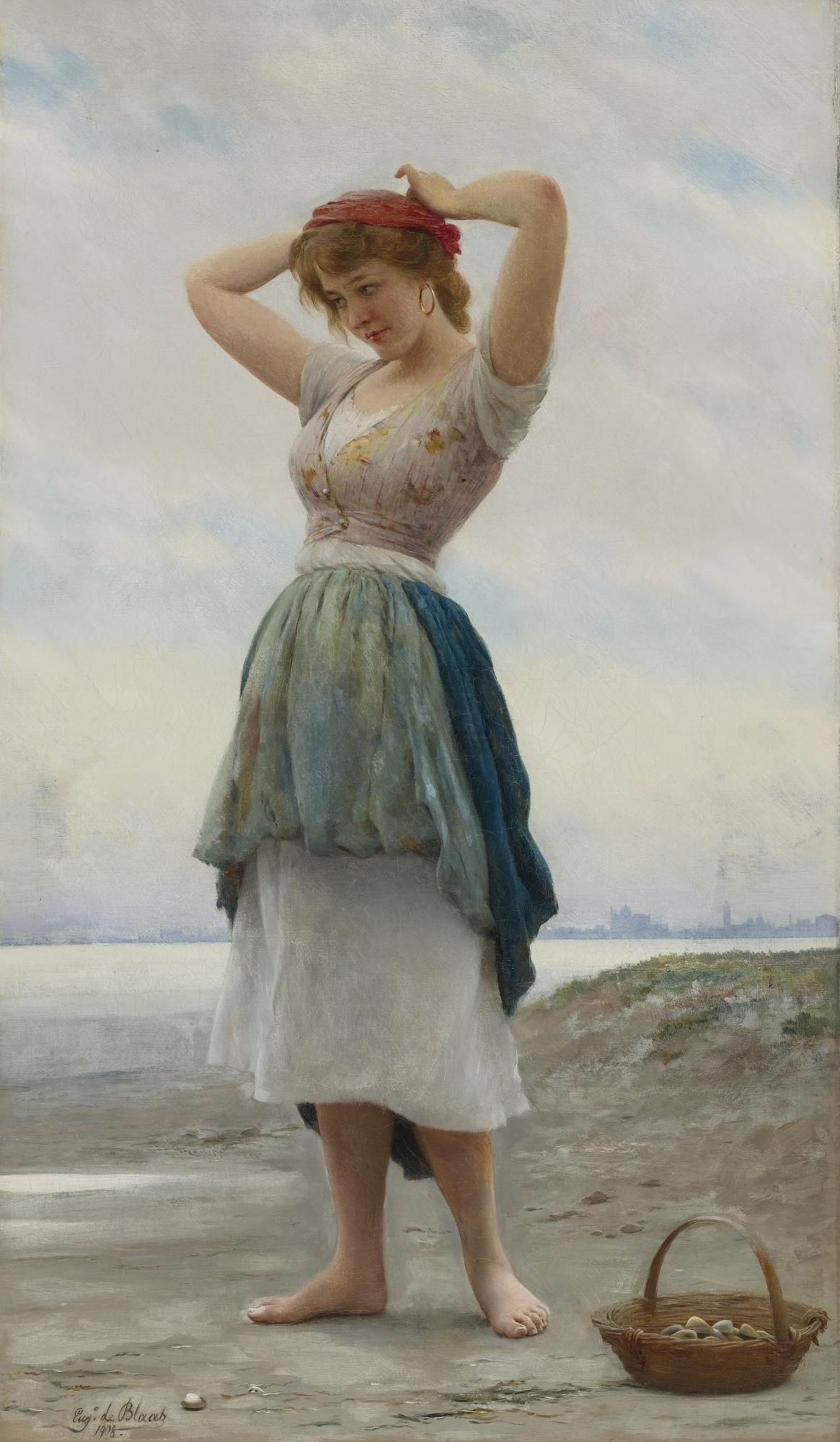
On the Beach

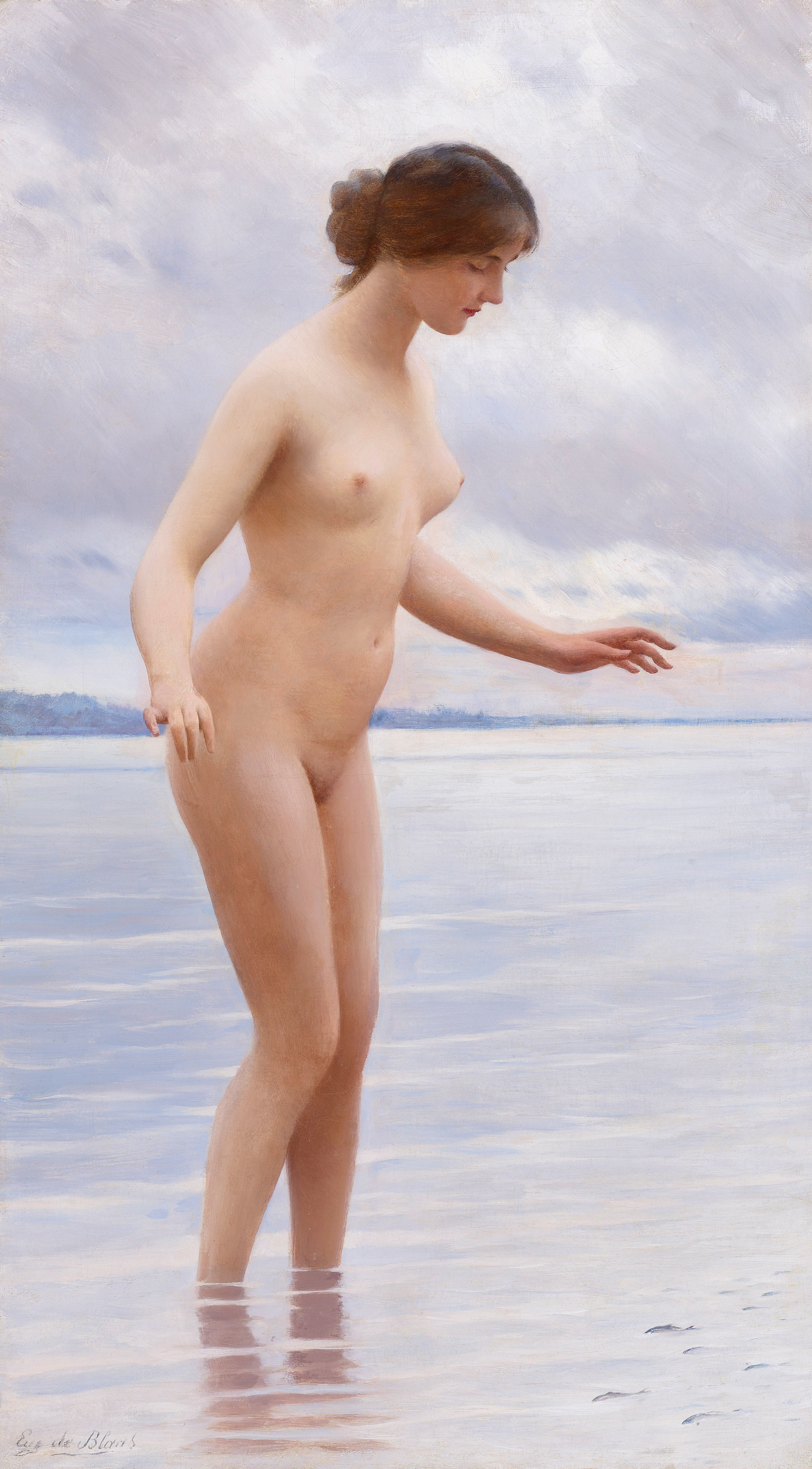
In the Water

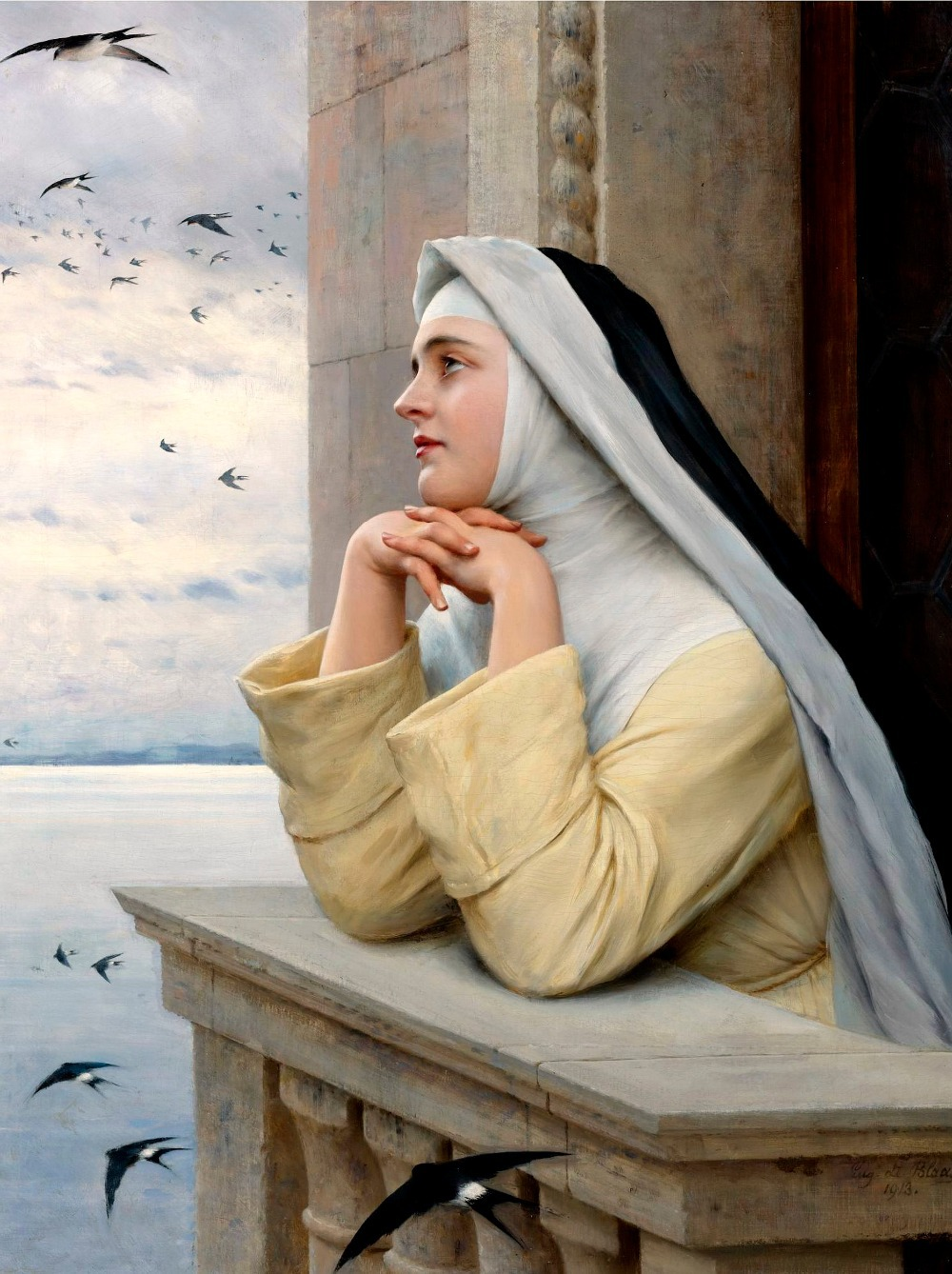
God's Creatures

== Cultural reference ==
- Salim Ghazi Saeedi has dedicated a song entitled "For Eugene, Distilling the Delicacy" to Eugene de Blaas in his 2011 album, Human Encounter.
