= Francesco Beda =

Italian painter (1840–1900)

Francesco Beda (Trieste, 29 November 1840 – 30 July 1900) was a painter from Austria-Hungary, mainly depicted costume genre subjects. The "costume genre subjects" were popular with some buyers, and depicted individuals in anachronistic, often aristocratic garb of the prior centuries, often entertained in either gallantry or frivolous enjoyment.

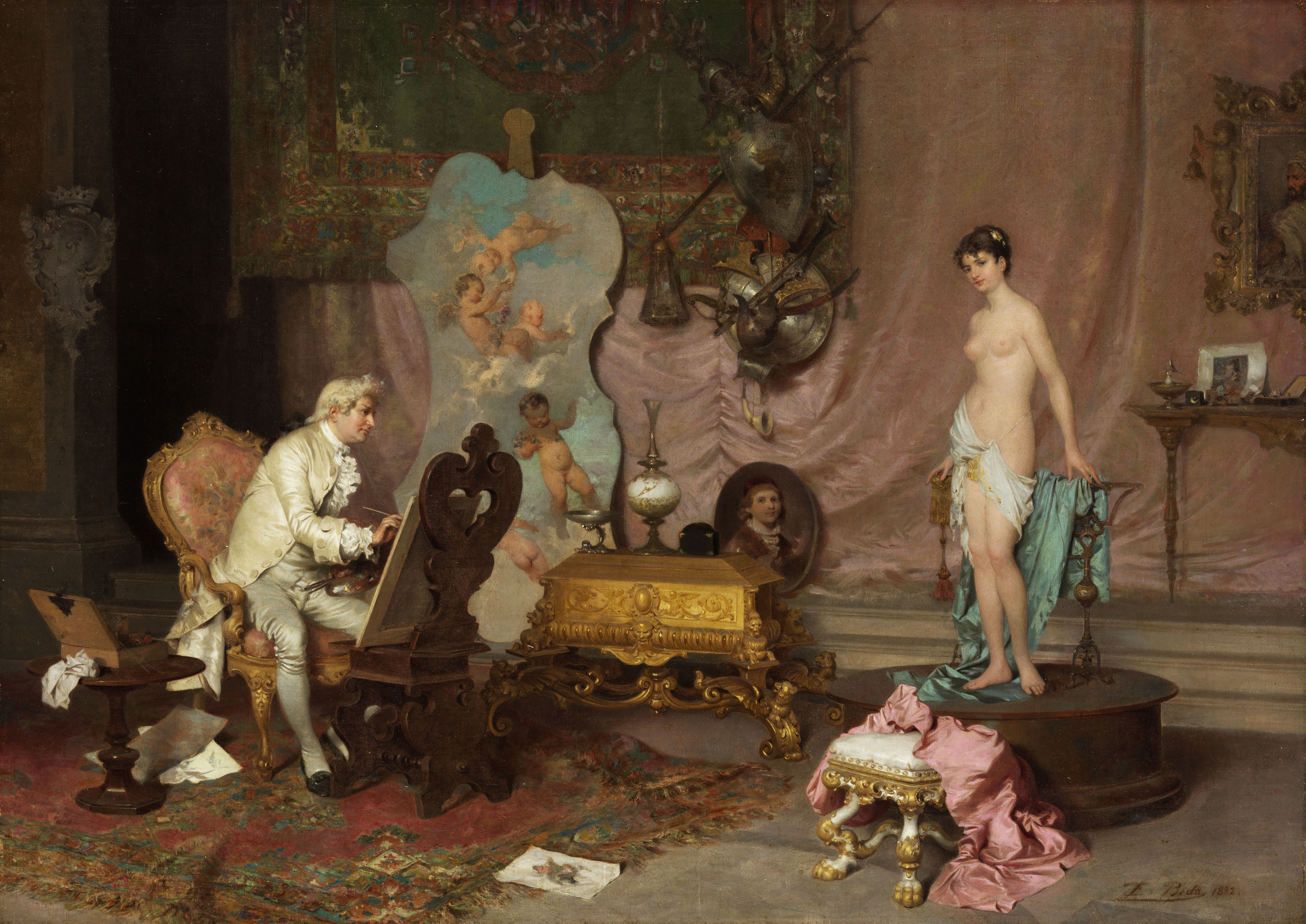
Painter in Studio with Model

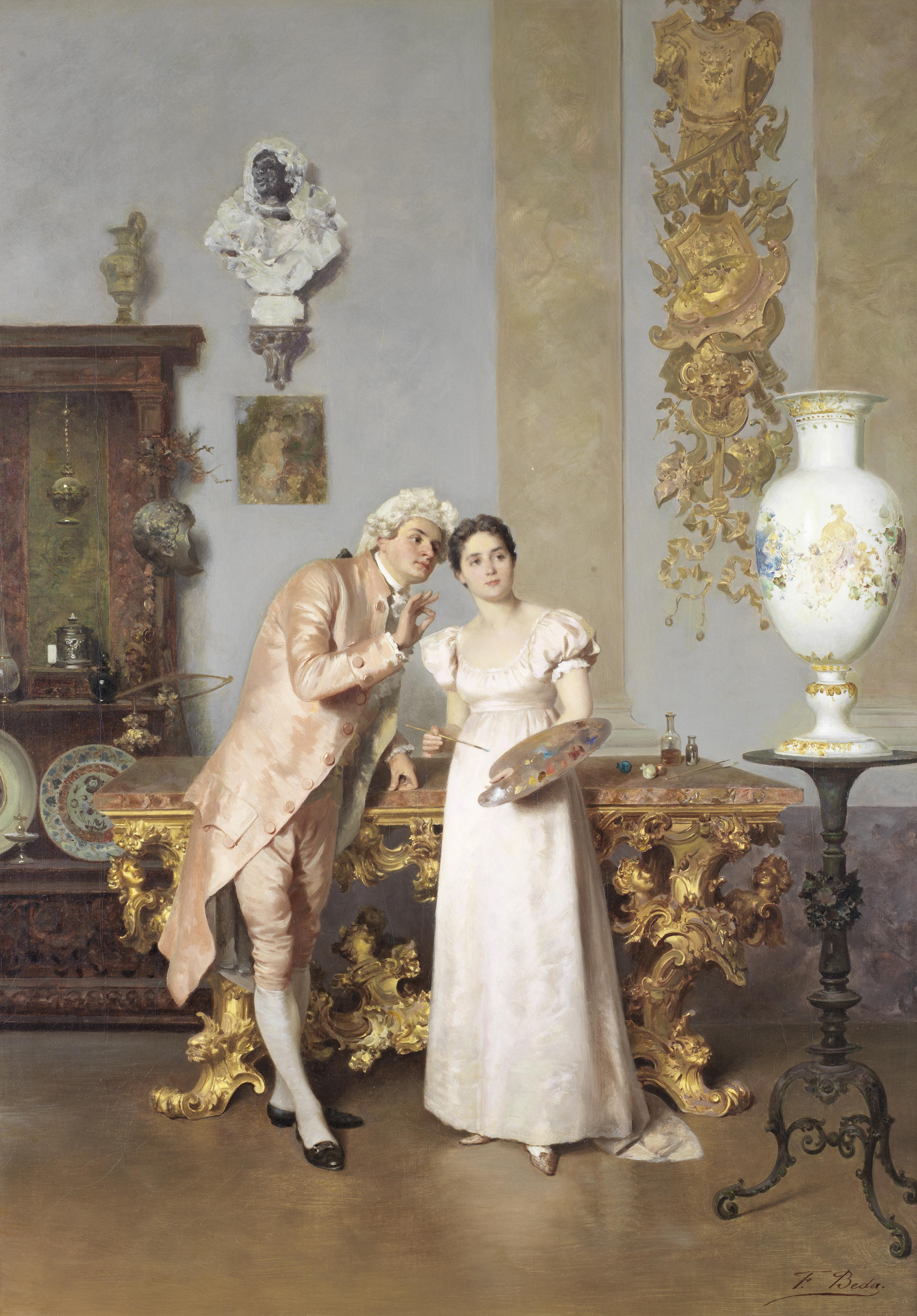
Art Lesson

== Biography ==
Francesco studied with Karl von Blaas in Vienna, but in addition to working in his native Trieste, he travelled and painted for patrons in Austria, Hungary, and Croatia. He painted portraits of the Empress Elisabeth of Austria, the Prince of Rolian, and Bishop Strossmayer of Zagreb. He also had an interest in Orientalist subjects as exemplified by Il Caffè Orientale di Trieste (c. 1888), now on display in the Civic Museum of Oriental Art of Trieste and the Capture of Slaves

Francesco's son Giulio Beda (Trieste 1879- Munich, 1942) was also a painter. After studying with Guglielmo Ciardi in Venice; in 1901 he moved to Munich in Bavaria, where he married the daughter of the painter Karl Michael Haider.

One of Beda's most famous works, "Chess Game" was infamously stolen from a private collection in London. Interpol tracked the painting to the United States but lost the trail somewhere in New Jersey.
