= God's Creatures (painting) =

Painting by Eugen von Blaas

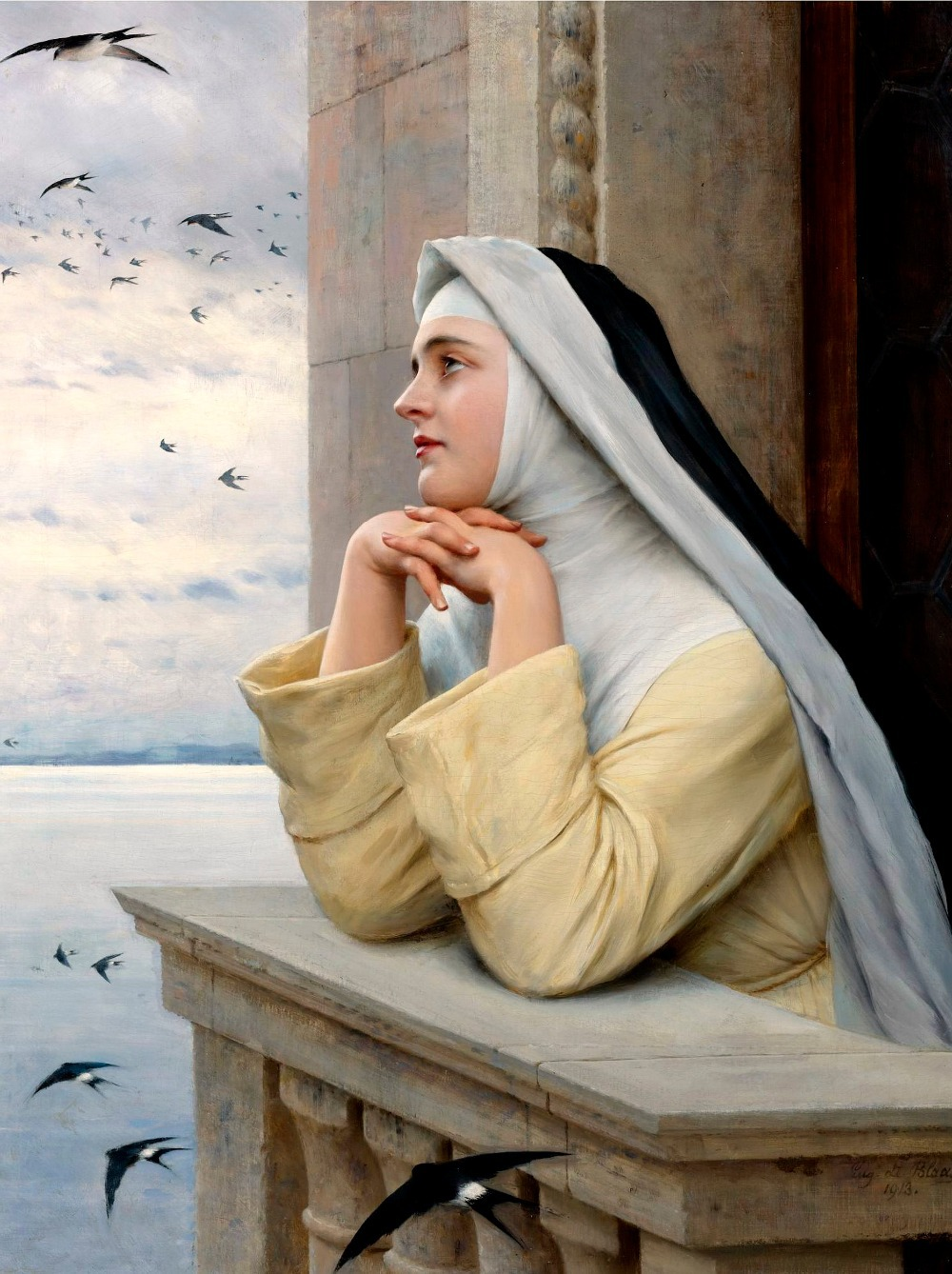
- Artist: Eugen von Blaas
- Year: 1913
- Medium: oil on Canvas
- Dimensions: 100 cm × 76 cm (39 in × 30 in)
- Location: Private collection

God's Creatures is a 1913 oil on canvas painting by Eugene de Blaas, an Italian artist born in Italy to an Austrian father. De Blaas, also known as Eugenio Blaas, had been largely taught to paint by his father, himself a painter, and adopted a style described as Academic Classicism.

In June 2020 this particular work, held in a private collection, was being auctioned by Sotheby's, making full use of internet bidding, with a starting bid of 70,000 GBP. It features a Catholic nun gazing meditatively from a balcony at a flock of swallows. Any meaning or symbolism in the work may be largely explained by von Blaas' heartfelt religious convictions. Nuns feature in several of his works.
