= Giuseppe Biancheri =

Italian politician (1821–1908)

The Honourable Giuseppe Biancheri
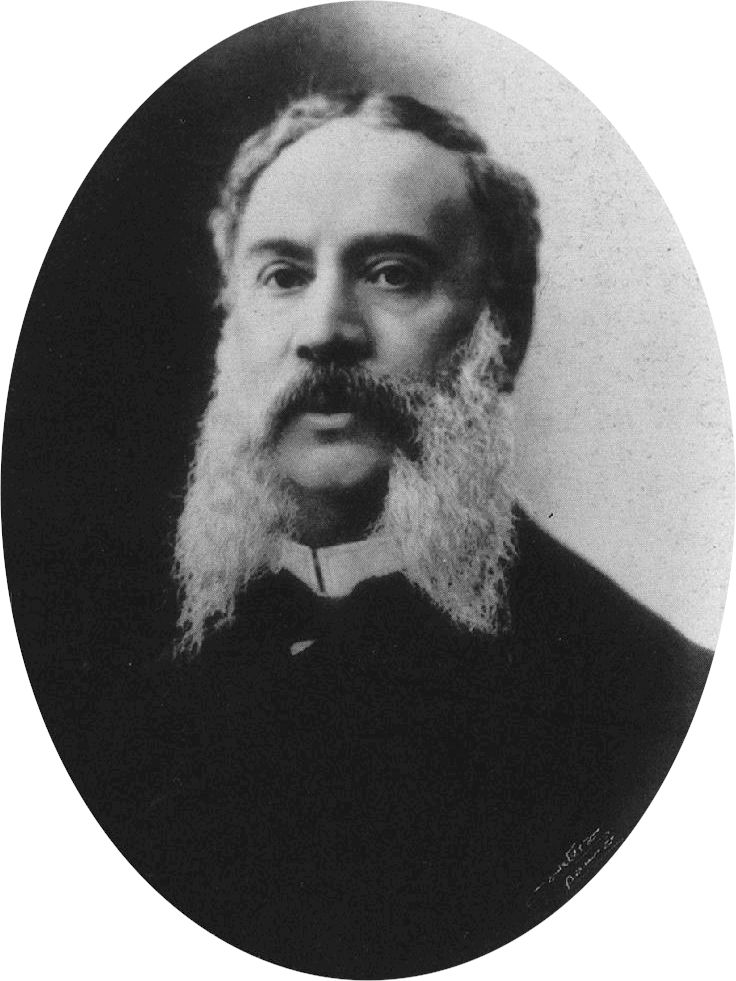
- Biancheri c.1860s

President of the Chamber of Deputies
- In office 10 March 1906 – 30 January 1907
- Preceded by: Giuseppe Marcora
- Succeeded by: Giuseppe Marcora
- In office 10 March 1902 – 18 October 1904
- Preceded by: Tommaso Villa
- Succeeded by: Giuseppe Marcora
- In office 26 January 1898 – 15 July 1898
- Preceded by: Giuseppe Zanardelli
- Succeeded by: Giuseppe Zanardelli
- In office 22 February 1894 – 13 January 1895
- Preceded by: Giuseppe Zanardelli
- Succeeded by: Tommaso Villa
- In office 7 April 1884 – 27 September 1892
- Preceded by: Michele Coppino
- Succeeded by: Giuseppe Zanardelli
- In office 12 March 1870 – 3 October 1876
- Preceded by: Giovanni Lanza
- Succeeded by: Francesco Crispi

Minister of the Navy
- In office 17 February 1867 – 10 April 1867
- Prime Minister: Bettino Ricasoli
- Preceded by: Agostino Depretis
- Succeeded by: Federico Pescetto

Member of the Chamber of Deputies
- In office 18 February 1861 – 28 October 1908

Personal details
- Born: 2 December 1821 Ventimiglia, Liguria, Italy
- Died: 28 October 1908 (aged 86) Turin, Piedmont, Italy
- Party: Historical Right
- Education: University of Turin
- Occupation: Politician; lawyer

Giuseppe Biancheri (2 December 1821 – 28 October 1908) was an Italian politician and lawyer.

He was the longest serving President of the Chamber of Deputies in united Italian history, having held the position for over 18 years between 1870 and 1907. He was also one of the longest serving Members of the Chamber of Deputies, having served from 1861 until his death in 1908.

== Life and career ==
Biancheri was born on 2 December 1821 in Ventimiglia. He attended a school of practical-commercial address in Munich, and then attended the University of Turin where he graduated with a law degree in 1846.

He was elected to the Chamber of Deputies of Sardinia for Sanremo in 1853 and was reelected in 1857 and 1860. He was then elected to the Chamber of Deputies in 1861. He would be reelected in 1865, 1867, 1870, 1874, 1876, 1880, 1882, 1886, 1890, 1892, 1895, 1897, 1900 and 1904. He served as Minister of the Navy in the Second Ricasoli government from February to April 1867. He was first elected President of the Chamber of Deputies in 1870 and last was elected in 1906, serving for over 18 years.

He died in Turin on 28 October 1908, at the age of 86.

== Honours ==
Knight of the Supreme Order of the Most Holy Annunciation - 1895

Knight of the Grand Cross of the Order of Saints Maurice and Lazarus - 1895

Knight of the Grand Cross of the Order of the Crown of Italy - 1895

== See also ==
- List of presidents of the Chamber of Deputies (Italy)
