= List of presidents of the Chamber of Deputies (Italy) =

Presidents of Chamber of Deputies

President of the Chamber of Deputies
- Presidente della Camera dei deputati
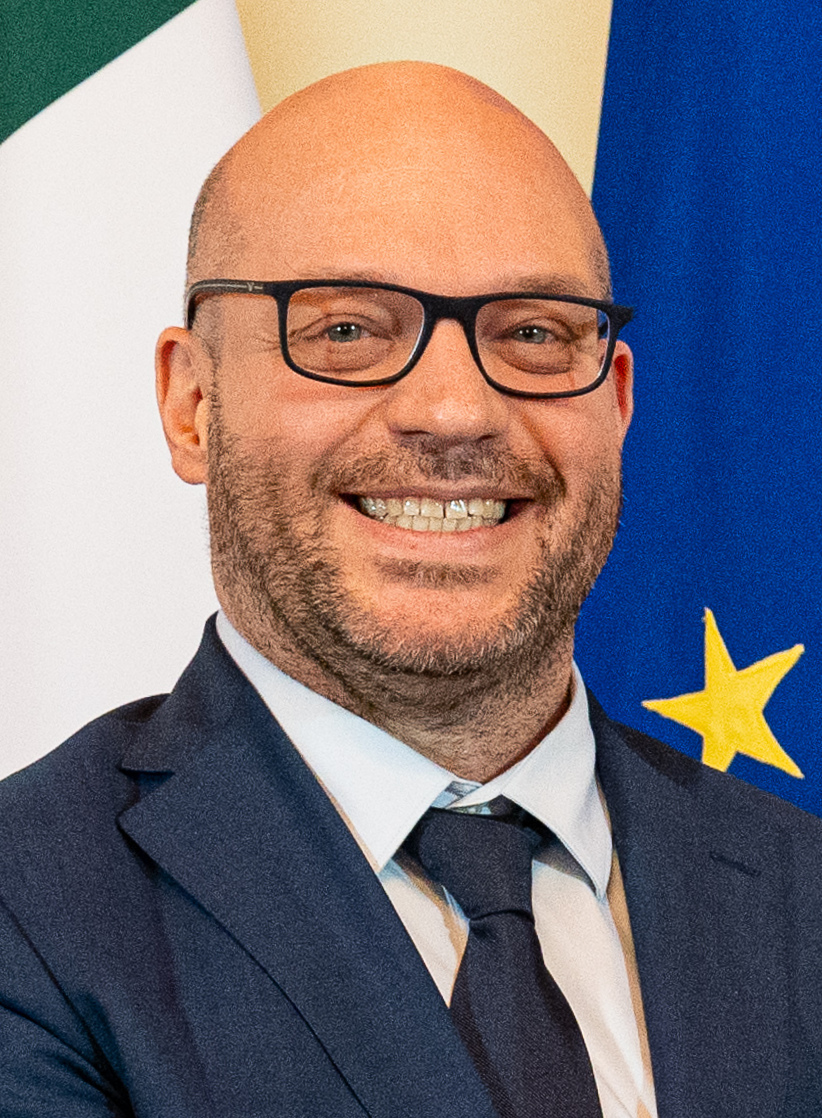
- Incumbent; Lorenzo Fontana since 14 October 2022
- Style: President
- Seat: Palazzo Montecitorio
- Appointer: Chamber of Deputies
- Term length: Length of the legislature
- Inaugural holder: Urbano Rattazzi
- Formation: 17 March 1861
- Website: www.camera.it

This is a list of the presidents of the Chamber of Deputies of Italy from the Kingdom of Sardinia to present. The president is the presiding officer of the Chamber of Deputies and also serves as presiding officer of joint sessions of the Italian Parliament, when the Chamber of Deputies and the Senate vote together.

The president is the speaker of the lower house of the Italian Parliament, the Chamber of Deputies. It is the third highest-ranking office of the Republic of Italy, after the president of the republic and the president of the Senate. Since 14 October 2022, the role has been held by Lorenzo Fontana, who was elected on the fourth vote with an absolute majority of the voting members.

== Kingdom of Sardinia (1848–1860) ==
Parties

- Moderate Party
- Independent

Portrait	Name (Born–Died)	Term of office			Party	Legislature	Ref.
Portrait	Name (Born–Died)	Took office	Left office	Time in office	Party	Legislature	Ref.
President of the Chamber of Deputies
	Vincenzo Gioberti (1801–1852)	8 May 1848	30 December 1848	236 days	Moderate Party	I (1848)	
	Lorenzo Pareto (1800–1865)	1 February 1849	20 November 1849	261 days	Independent	II (Jan 1849)	
	Lorenzo Pareto (1800–1865)	1 February 1849	20 November 1849	261 days	Independent	III (Jul 1849)	
	Pier Dionigi Pinelli (1805–1852)	20 December 1849	22 April 1852	2 years, 124 days	Independent	IV (Dec 1849)	
	Urbano Rattazzi (1808–1873)	11 May 1852	27 October 1853	1 year, 169 days	Moderate Party	IV (Dec 1849)	
	Carlo Bon Compagni di Mobello (1804–1880)	16 November 1853	16 June 1856	2 years, 213 days	Moderate Party	V (1853)	
	Carlo Cadorna (1809–1891)	7 January 1857	16 July 1857	190 days	Moderate Party	V (1853)	
	Carlo Bon Compagni di Mombello (1804–1880)	14 December 1857	14 July 1858	212 days	Moderate Party	VI (1857)	
	Urbano Rattazzi (1808–1873)	20 January 1859	21 January 1860	1 year, 1 day	Moderate Party	VI (1857)	
	Giovanni Lanza (1810–1882)	2 April 1860	17 December 1860	259 days	Moderate Party	VII (1860)	

== Kingdom of Italy (1861–1946) ==
Parties

- 1861–1912:
  - Historical Right
  - Historical Left
- 1912–1924:
  - Italian Radical Party
  - Democratic Liberal Party
  - Italian Liberal Party
- 1924–1943:
  - National Fascist Party
- 1943–1946:
  - Italian Liberal Party
  - Italian Republican Party

Portrait	Name (Born–Died)	Term of office			Party	Legislature	Ref.
Portrait	Name (Born–Died)	Took office	Left office	Time in office	Party	Legislature	Ref.
President of the Chamber of Deputies
	Urbano Rattazzi (1808–1873)	18 February 1861	3 March 1862	1 year, 44 days	Historical Left	VIII (1861)	
	Sebastiano Tecchio (1807–1886)	22 March 1862	21 May 1863	1 year, 60 days	Historical Left	VIII (1861)	
	Giovanni Battista Cassinis (1806–1866)	21 May 1863	7 September 1865	2 years, 109 days	Historical Right	VIII (1861)	
	Adriano Mari (1813–1887)	18 November 1865	27 October 1867	1 year, 343 days	Historical Right	IX (1865)	
	Giovanni Lanza (1810–1882)	16 December 1867	8 August 1868	236 days	Historical Right	X (1867)	
	Adriano Mari (1813–1887)	25 November 1868	14 August 1869	262 days	Historical Right	X (1867)	
	Giovanni Lanza (1810–1882)	18 November 1869	15 December 1869	27 days	Historical Right	X (1867)	
	Giuseppe Biancheri (1821–1908)	12 March 1870	3 October 1876	6 years, 205 days	Historical Right	XI (1870)	
	Giuseppe Biancheri (1821–1908)	12 March 1870	3 October 1876	6 years, 205 days	Historical Right	XII (1874)	
	Francesco Crispi (1818–1901)	26 November 1876	26 December 1877	1 year, 30 days	Historical Left	XIII (1876)	
	Benedetto Cairoli (1825–1889)	7 March 1880	24 March 1880	17 days	Historical Left	XIII (1876)	
	Domenico Farini (1834–1900)	27 March 1878	19 March 1880	2 years, 2 days	Historical Left	XIII (1876)	
	Michele Coppino (1822–1901)	13 April 1880	2 May 1880	19 days	Historical Left	XIII (1876)	
	Domenico Farini (1834–1900)	26 May 1880	12 March 1884	3 years, 291 days	Historical Left	XIV (1880)	
	Domenico Farini (1834–1900)	26 May 1880	12 March 1884	3 years, 291 days	Historical Left	XV (1882)	
	Michele Coppino (1822–1901)	19 March 1884	3 April 1884	15 days	Historical Left	XV (1882)	
	Giuseppe Biancheri (1821–1908)	7 April 1884	27 September 1892	8 years, 173 days	Historical Right	XVI (1886)	
	Giuseppe Biancheri (1821–1908)	7 April 1884	27 September 1892	8 years, 173 days	Historical Right	XVII (1890)	
	Giuseppe Zanardelli (1826–1908)	23 November 1892	20 February 1894	1 year, 59 days	Historical Left	XVIII (1892)	
	Giuseppe Biancheri (1821–1908)	22 February 1894	13 January 1895	325 days	Historical Right	XVIII (1892)	
	Tommaso Villa (1832–1915)	10 June 1895	2 March 1897	325 days	Historical Left	XIX (1895)	
	Giuseppe Zanardelli (1826–1908)	5 April 1897	14 December 1897	253 days	Historical Left	XX (1897)	
	Giuseppe Biancheri (1821–1908)	26 January 1898	15 July 1898	170 days	Historical Right	XX (1897)	
	Giuseppe Zanardelli (1826–1908)	16 November 1898	25 May 1899	190 days	Historical Left	XX (1897)	
	Luigi Chinaglia (1841–1906)	30 May 1899	25 June 1899	26 days	Historical Left	XX (1897)	
	Giuseppe Colombo (1836–1921)	14 November 1899	17 May 1900	184 days	Historical Left	XX (1897)	
	Nicolò Gallo (1849–1907)	16 June 1900	25 June 1900	10 days	Historical Left	XXI (1900)	
	Tommaso Villa (1832–1915)	28 June 1900	22 February 1902	1 year, 239 days	Historical Left	XXI (1900)	
	Giuseppe Biancheri (1821–1908)	10 March 1902	18 October 1904	2 years, 222 days	Historical Right	XXI (1900)	
	Giuseppe Marcora (1841–1927)	30 November 1904	10 March 1906	1 year, 131 days	Italian Radical Party	XXII (1904)	
	Giuseppe Biancheri (1821–1908)	10 March 1906	30 January 1907	326 days	Historical Right	XXII (1904)	
	Giuseppe Marcora (1841–1927)	2 February 1907	29 September 1919	12 years, 231 days	Italian Radical Party	XXIII (1909)	
	Giuseppe Marcora (1841–1927)	2 February 1907	29 September 1919	12 years, 231 days	Italian Radical Party	XXIV (1913)	
	Vittorio Emanuele Orlando (1860–1952)	1 December 1919	25 June 1920	207 days	Democratic Liberal Party	XXV (1919)	
	Enrico De Nicola (1877–1959)	26 June 1920	25 January 1924	3 years, 213 days	Italian Liberal Party	XXVI (1921)	
	Alfredo Rocco (1875–1935)	24 May 1924	5 January 1925	226 days	National Fascist Party	XXVII (1924)	
	Antonio Casertano (1863–1938)	13 January 1925	25 January 1929	4 years, 12 days	National Fascist Party	XXVII (1924)	
	Giovanni Giuriati (1876–1970)	20 April 1929	19 January 1934	4 years, 274 days	National Fascist Party	XXVIII (1929)	
	Costanzo Ciano (1876–1939)	28 April 1934	2 March 1939	4 years, 308 days	National Fascist Party	XXIX (1934)	
President of the Chamber of Fasces and Corporations
	Costanzo Ciano (1876–1939)	23 March 1939	26 June 1939	95 days	National Fascist Party	XXX (No election)	
	Dino Grandi (1895–1988)	30 November 1939	2 August 1943	3 years, 245 days	National Fascist Party	XXX (No election)	
President of the Chamber of Deputies
	Vittorio Emanuele Orlando (1860–1952)	2 August 1943	25 September 1945	2 years, 54 days	Italian Liberal Party	Abolished Parliament	
President of the National Council
	Carlo Sforza (1872–1952)	25 September 1945	1 June 1946	103 days	Italian Republican Party	National Council	

== Italian Republic (1946–present) ==
Parties

- 1946–1994:
  - Christian Democracy
  - Italian Socialist Party
  - Italian Communist Party / Democratic Party of the Left
- 1994–present:
  - Democratic Party of the Left / Democrats of the Left
  - Lega Nord / Lega
  - Christian Democratic Centre / Union of the Centre
  - Communist Refoundation Party
  - The People of Freedom / Future and Freedom
  - Left Ecology Freedom
  - Five Star Movement

Portrait	Name (Born–Died)	Term of office			Party	Legislature	Ref.
Portrait	Name (Born–Died)	Took office	Left office	Time in office	Party	Legislature	Ref.
President of the Constituent Assembly
	Giuseppe Saragat (1898–1988)	25 June 1946	6 February 1947	226 days	Italian Socialist Party	Constituent Assembly (1946)	
	Umberto Terracini (1895–1983)	8 February 1947	31 January 1948	357 days	Italian Communist Party	Constituent Assembly (1946)	
President of the Chamber of Deputies
	Giovanni Gronchi (1887–1978)	8 May 1948	29 April 1955	6 years, 356 days	Christian Democracy	I (1948)	
	Giovanni Gronchi (1887–1978)	8 May 1948	29 April 1955	6 years, 356 days	Christian Democracy	II (1953)	
	Giovanni Leone (1908–2001)	10 May 1955	21 June 1963	8 years, 42 days	Christian Democracy	III (1958)	
	Brunetto Bucciarelli-Ducci (1914–1994)	26 June 1963	4 June 1968	4 years, 344 days	Christian Democracy	IV (1963)	
	Sandro Pertini (1896–1990)	5 June 1968	4 July 1976	8 years, 29 days	Italian Socialist Party	V (1968)	
	Sandro Pertini (1896–1990)	5 June 1968	4 July 1976	8 years, 29 days	Italian Socialist Party	VI (1972)	
	Pietro Ingrao (1915–2015)	5 July 1976	19 June 1979	2 years, 349 days	Italian Communist Party	VII (1976)	
	Nilde Iotti (1920–1999)	20 June 1979	22 April 1992	12 years, 298 days	Italian Communist Party / Democratic Party of the Left	VIII (1979)	
	Nilde Iotti (1920–1999)	20 June 1979	22 April 1992	12 years, 298 days	Italian Communist Party / Democratic Party of the Left	IX (1983)	
	Nilde Iotti (1920–1999)	20 June 1979	22 April 1992	12 years, 298 days	Italian Communist Party / Democratic Party of the Left	X (1987)	
	Oscar Luigi Scalfaro (1918–2012)	24 April 1992	25 May 1992	31 days	Christian Democracy	XI (1992)	
	Giorgio Napolitano (1925–2023)	3 June 1992	14 April 1994	1 year, 315 days	Democratic Party of the Left	XI (1992)	
	Irene Pivetti (b. 1963)	16 April 1994	8 May 1996	2 years, 22 days	Lega Nord	XII (1994)	
	Luciano Violante (b. 1941)	10 May 1996	29 May 2001	5 years, 19 days	Democratic Party of the Left / Democrats of the Left	XIII (1996)	
	Pier Ferdinando Casini (b. 1955)	31 May 2001	27 April 2006	4 years, 331 days	Christian Democratic Centre / Union of Christian and Centre Democrats	XIV (2001)	
	Fausto Bertinotti (b. 1940)	29 April 2006	28 April 2008	1 year, 365 days	Communist Refoundation Party	XV (2006)	
	Gianfranco Fini (b. 1952)	30 April 2008	14 March 2013	4 years, 318 days	The People of Freedom / Future and Freedom	XVI (2008)	
	Laura Boldrini (b. 1961)	16 March 2013	22 March 2018	5 years, 6 days	Left Ecology Freedom / Italian Left	XVII (2013)	
	Roberto Fico (b. 1974)	24 March 2018	13 October 2022	4 years, 203 days	Five Star Movement	XVIII (2018)	
	Lorenzo Fontana (b. 1980)	14 October 2022	Incumbent	3 years, 328 days	Lega	XIX (2022)	

== See also ==
- Chamber of Deputies (Italy)
- List of presidents of the Senate of the Republic (Italy)
