= Italian general elections =

Italian general elections determine the composition of the Italian Parliament.

== Procedure ==
Elections to the Italian Parliament take place every five years or in the event of its early dissolution.

Currently, both chambers of the Italian Parliament, the Chamber of Deputies and the Senate of the Republic, are elected at the same time by universal and direct suffrage.

147 deputies (members of the Chamber of Deputies) and 74 senators (members of the Senate of the Republic) are elected in single-member constituencies and the rest from party lists. (In addition, there are also several so-called "senators for life". These include former Italian presidents and people appointed by presidential decree in recognition of special service to the country.)

=== Voter and candidate eligibility ===
Any Italian citizen over the age of 18 on the election day is eligible to elect the members of the Italian parliament.

In order to be eligible to stand for election to the Chamber of Deputies, an individual must be over the age of 25 on the election day, and in order to be eligible to stand for election to the Senate of the Republic, an individual must be over the age of 40 on the election day.

== General elections to the Parliament ==
=== Kingdom of Italy ===
- 1861 Italian general election
- 1865 Italian general election
- 1867 Italian general election
- 1870 Italian general election
- 1874 Italian general election
- 1876 Italian general election
- 1880 Italian general election
- 1882 Italian general election
- 1886 Italian general election
- 1890 Italian general election
- 1892 Italian general election
- 1895 Italian general election
- 1897 Italian general election
- 1900 Italian general election
- 1904 Italian general election
- 1909 Italian general election
- 1913 Italian general election
- 1919 Italian general election
- 1921 Italian general election
- 1924 Italian general election
- 1929 Italian general election
- 1934 Italian general election
- 1946 Italian general election

=== Italian Republic ===
- 1948 Italian general election
- 1953 Italian general election
- 1958 Italian general election
- 1963 Italian general election
- 1968 Italian general election
- 1972 Italian general election
- 1976 Italian general election
- 1979 Italian general election
- 1983 Italian general election
- 1987 Italian general election
- 1992 Italian general election
- 1994 Italian general election
- 1996 Italian general election
- 2001 Italian general election
- 2006 Italian general election
- 2008 Italian general election
- 2013 Italian general election
- 2018 Italian general election
- 2022 Italian general election

== See also ==
- Elections in Italy
