= Historical Far Left =

Historical political faction in Italy

Historical Far Left Estrema Sinistra Storica
- Leaders: Agostino Bertani; Felice Cavallotti; Andrea Còsta; Filippo Turati; Ettore Sacchi
- Founded: 4 November 1877
- Dissolved: 27 May 1904
- Preceded by: Action Party
- Succeeded by: Italian Radical Party; Italian Republican Party; Italian Socialist Party
- Headquarters: Palazzo Montecitorio, Rome
- Ideology: Republicanism; Nationalism; Radicalism; Socialism; Anti-clericalism
- Political position: Left-wing

The Historical Far Left (Italian: Estrema Sinistra Storica), originally known as Far Left (Italian: Estrema Sinistra), Radical Extreme (Italian: Estrema Radicale), simply The Extreme (Italian: L'Estrema), or Party of Democracy (Italian: Partito della Democrazia), was a left-wing parliamentary group and coalition of Radical, Republican and Socialist politicians in Italy during the second half of the 19th century. Formerly known as the extreme wing of the Historical Left before the unification of Italy, it became a separate group when the more moderate branch of the Left accepted the leadership of the House of Savoy to build the new Italian state.

== History ==
The Historical Far Left was founded in 1877 by Agostino Bertani and Felice Cavallotti as a radical-liberal party. In 1882, the Radicals formed a far-left parliamentary group with Andrea Costa, the first Socialist to be elected to the Italian Parliament. The party supported complete separation of church and state, decentralization toward municipal governments, the United States of Europe according to Carlo Cattaneo's beliefs, progressive taxation, an independent judiciary, free and compulsory education for children, universal suffrage, women's and workers' rights while opposing capital punishment as well as any kind of protectionism, nationalism, imperialism and colonialism.

The Extreme was mainly formed by three groups:

- The Radicals, who supported democratic ideas, transitionally accepting the constitutional monarchy if it would allow universal suffrage.
- The Republicans, who insisted upon an Italian Republic and consequently refused any collaboration with the existing monarchist state.
- The Socialists, who saw universal suffrage and the proclamation of the republic as a first step toward a social revolution.

The Historical Far Left, supporting the republic and consequently the abrogation of the Albertine Statute, was seen as an anticonstitutional movement. Under the oligarchic electoral law of newly unified Italy, there was no possibility for The Extreme to enter the Italian Parliament, except for some national heroes such as Giuseppe Garibaldi. The electoral reform of 1882 allowed the possibility to form a small opposition parliamentary group, but only after the introduction of universal suffrage in 1913 did The Extreme become the dominant left-wing party of the Italian Chamber of Deputies and the winning coalition in many municipal and provincial elections in Northern Italy.

The Historical Far Left emerged as an important parliamentary force when the progressive Historical Left overthrew Marco Minghetti's government during the so-called Parliamentary Revolution of 1876, leading to Agostino Depretis becoming Prime Minister. However, Depretis immediately began to look for support among the Right Members of Parliament, who readily changed their positions, in a context of widespread corruption. This phenomenon, known in Italian as trasformismo (roughly translatable in English as "transformism"—in a satirical newspaper, Prime Minister Depretis was depicted as a chameleon), effectively removed political differences in Parliament, which was dominated by an undistinguished liberal bloc with a landslide majority until after World War I.

== Important members ==
Important leaders and members of the Historical Far Left were Agostino Bertani, Andrea Costa, Filippo Turati, Napoleone Colajanni, Francesco Saverio Nitti, Giovanni Bovio, Giovanni Cantoni, Felice Cavallotti, Enrico Ferri, Ernesto Nathan and Ettore Sacchi.

== Electoral results ==
Chamber of Deputies
Election year	Votes	%	Seats	+/–	Leader
1861	Unknown (3rd)	2.3	14 / 493	▲14	Giuseppe Mazzini
1865	Unknown (3rd)	4.9	15 / 493	▲1	Giuseppe Mazzini
1867	Unknown (3rd)		0 / 493	▼15	Agostino Bertani
1870	Unknown (3rd)	1.9	0 / 493	–	Agostino Bertani
1874	Unknown (3rd)	1.6	0 / 508	–	Agostino Bertani
1876	Unknown (3rd)	1.5	0 / 508	–	Agostino Bertani
1880	Unknown (4th)	1.8	0 / 508	–	Agostino Bertani
1882	105,251 (3rd)	8.6	44 / 508	▲44	Agostino Bertani
1886	123,958 (3rd)	5.2	45 / 508	▲1	Felice Cavallotti
1890	101,924 (3rd)	6.9	42 / 508	▼3	Felice Cavallotti
1892	182,256 (3rd)	11.0	56 / 508	▲14	Felice Cavallotti
1895	224,879 (3rd)	18.5	62 / 508	▲6	Felice Cavallotti
1897	201,120 (3rd)	16.2	82 / 508	▲20	Felice Cavallotti
1900	333,945 (2nd)	26.3	96 / 508	▲14	Ettore Sacchi
