= Action Party (Italy, 1853) =

Action Party Partito d'Azione
- Leader: Giuseppe Mazzini
- Founded: March 1853
- Dissolved: 4 November 1867
- Preceded by: Italian National Association
- Succeeded by: Historical Far Left
- Headquarters: Genoa, Italy
- Newspaper: L'Unità italiana
- Paramilitary wing: Redshirts
- Ideology: Federalism; Italian nationalism Radicalism; Republicanism
- Political position: Left-wing
- International affiliation: Young Europe
- Colours: Red
- Slogan: Unione, Forza e Libertà ("Union, Strength and Liberty")

The Action Party (Italian: Partito d'Azione) was an Italian pre-unitary political party active during the Risorgimento. It was the first organized party in the history of Italy.

== History ==
After the failure of the Italian revolutions of 1848, Giuseppe Mazzini's Young Italy was dissolved as a political organization to form the Italian National Association (Italian: Associazione Nazionale Italiana), which was still led by Mazzini.

During the 1848–1849, the Italian National Association competed against the rival Moderate Party led by Vincenzo Gioberti and Massimo d'Azeglio that won the election in the Kingdom of Sardinia and established a new government. After some years of weak activities, the Italian National Association was renamed in 1853 by Mazzini to the Action Party, which published the booklet-manifesto "To the Italians" (Agli Italiani) and invited Italians to start various rebel and republican organizations. This tactic was changed after the failed Sapri expedition that same year, where Carlo Pisacane died.

In 1860, the Action Party financed the creation of a paramilitary group led by Giuseppe Garibaldi named the Redshirts (Camicie rosse). The Redshirts became particularly famous for the Expedition of the Thousand, when Garibaldi conquered the entire Kingdom of the Two Sicilies and the Papal States in a few months. In this period, the Action Party was strongly opposed to the Moderate Party and its new leader Camillo Benso di Cavour, who was close to the House of Savoy. Mazzini particularly hated the annexation war, the falsification of the referendums and the Piedmontization of Italy that ignored the various diversities of a unified Italy. The Action Party founded the first mutual aid societies, workers' associations, public schools and cooperatives. In 1861, Mazzini founded the newspaper of the Action Party, L'Unità italiana. In 1867, the Action Party attempted to conclude the Unification War and take over Rome with the Battle of Mentana, which failed. Disappointed, Mazzini dissolved the Action Party and retired from politics. In 1870, Rome was captured and became the capital of the Kingdom of Italy.

In 1877, Agostino Bertani, a former member of the Action Party, left the Historical Left to form the Historical Far-Left, reputed to be the real heir of the Action Party.

== Proposals and goals ==
- Unification of Italy, including the "Irrident Lands".
- Abolition of the monarchy and creation of a republic.
- Elections with universal suffrage.
- Support of the freedom of religion, press, speech and thought.

== Electoral results ==
Chamber of Deputies
Election year	Votes	%	Seats	+/−	Leader
1861	Unknown (3rd)	2.3	14 / 443	–	Giuseppe Mazzini
1865	Unknown (3rd)	3.5	15 / 443	▲1	Giuseppe Mazzini

== See also ==
- Liberalism and radicalism in Italy
