= Antonio D'Alì (born 1860) =

Italian politician (1860–1916)

Member of the Chamber of Deputies
- In office 30 November 1904 – 29 September 1913

Personal details
- Born: 29 November 1860 Palermo, Kingdom of the Two Sicilies
- Died: 6 August 1916 (aged 55) Trapani, Kingdom of Italy

Antonio D'Alì (29 November 1860 – 6 August 1916) was an Italian politician who served as a member of the Chamber of Deputies of the Kingdom of Italy from 1904 to 1913, representing the Alcamo constituency during the 22nd and 23rd legislatures.

D'Alì was the son of Giuseppe D'Alì, a member of the Senate of the Kingdom of Italy, and Rosalia Bordonaro Chiaramonte. He belonged to the D'Alì family of Trapani. He married Maria Monroy, daughter of Giuseppe Monroy and Barlotta, with whom he had a son, Giuseppe D'Alì Monroy, and five daughters.
