= 1890 Italian general election =

- 23 November 1890 (first round); 30 November 1890 (second round)

All 508 seats in the Chamber of Deputies 255 seats needed for a majority
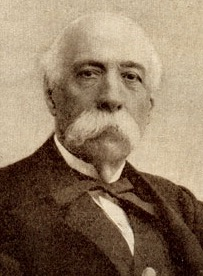

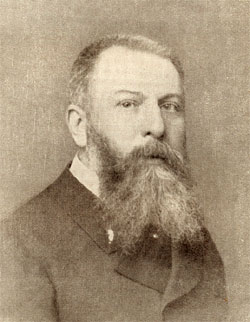

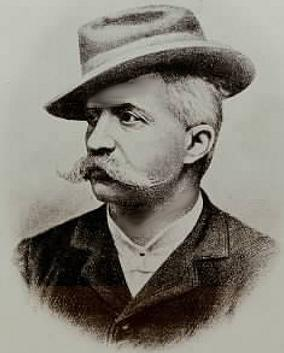
	Majority party	Minority party	Third party
Leader	Francesco Crispi	Antonio Starabba di Rudinì	Felice Cavallotti
Party	Historical Left	Historical Right	Historical Far Left
Seats won	401	48	42
Seat change	▲109	▼97	▼3
Prime Minister before election
Francesco Crispi
Historical Left
Elected Prime Minister
Francesco Crispi
Historical Left

General elections were held in Italy on 23 November 1890, with a second round of voting on 30 November. The "ministerial" left-wing bloc emerged as the largest in Parliament, winning 401 of the 508 seats. As in 1886, the elections were held using small multi-member constituencies with between two and five seats.

== Background ==
Francesco Crispi was appointed prime minister on 29 July 1887. True to his initial progressive leanings he moved ahead with stalled reforms, abolishing the death penalty, revoking anti-strike laws, limiting police powers, reforming the penal code and the administration of justice with the help of his Minister of Justice Giuseppe Zanardelli, reorganising charities and passing public health laws and legislation to protect emigrants that worked abroad. He sought popular support for the state with a programme of orderly development at home and expansion abroad.

His desire to make Italy a colonial power led to conflicts with France, which rejected Italian claims to Tunisia and opposed Italian expansion elsewhere in Africa. One of his first acts as premier was a visit to the German chancellor Otto von Bismarck, whom he desired to consult upon the working of the Triple Alliance. Basing his foreign policy upon the alliance, as supplemented by the naval entente with Great Britain negotiated by his predecessor, Robilant, Crispi assumed a resolute attitude towards France, breaking off the prolonged and unfruitful negotiations for a new Franco-Italian commercial treaty, and refusing the French invitation to organize an Italian section at the Paris Exhibition of 1889.

Crispi and his Treasury Minister Giovanni Giolitti knew of an 1889 government inspection report about the Banca Romana, which had loaned large sums to property developers but was left with huge liabilities when the real estate bubble collapsed in 1887, but feared that publicity might undermine public confidence and suppressed the report. Forsaken by his Radical friends, Crispi governed with the help of the right until he was overthrown by Antonio Di Rudinì in February 1891, who was succeeded by Giovanni Giolitti in May 1892.

== Parties and leaders ==
Party	Ideology	Leader
Historical Left	Liberalism	Francesco Crispi
Historical Right	Conservatism	Antonio Starabba di Rudinì
Historical Far Left	Radicalism	Felice Cavallotti

== Results ==
Party	Votes	%	Seats	+/–
Historical Left			401	+109
Historical Right			48	−97
Historical Far Left			42	−3
Others			17	New
Total			508	0
Valid votes	1,452,797	98.35		
Invalid/blank votes	24,376	1.65		
Total votes	1,477,173	100.00		
Registered voters/turnout	2,752,658	53.66		
Source: Nohlen & Stöver
