= 1892 Italian general election =

- 6 November 1892 (first round); 13 November 1892 (second round)

All 508 seats in the Chamber of Deputies 255 seats needed for a majority
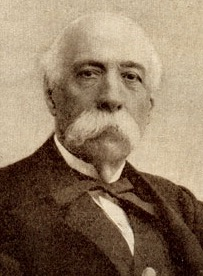

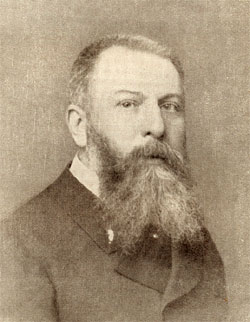

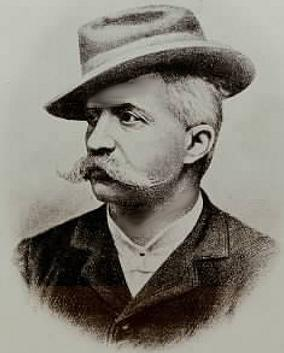
	Majority party	Minority party	Third party
Leader	Francesco Crispi	Antonio Starabba di Rudinì	Felice Cavallotti
Party	Historical Left	Historical Right	Historical Far Left
Seats won	323	93	56
Seat change	▼78	▲45	▲14
Prime Minister before election
Antonio Starabba, Marchese di Rudinì
Historical Right
Elected Prime Minister
Giovanni Giolitti
Historical Left

General elections were held in Italy on 6 November 1892, with a second round of voting on 13 November. The "ministerial" left-wing bloc emerged as the largest in Parliament, winning 323 of the 508 seats. The electoral system reverted to the pre-1882 method of using single-member constituencies with second round run-offs.

== Background ==
Giovanni Giolitti's first term as Prime Minister (1892–1893) was marked by misfortune and misgovernment. The building crisis and the commercial rupture with France had impaired the situation of the state banks, of which one, the Banca Romana, had been further undermined by misadministration. The Banca Romana had loaned large sums to property developers but was left with huge liabilities when the real estate bubble collapsed in 1887. Then Prime Minister Francesco Crispi and his Treasury Minister Giolitti knew of the 1889 government inspection report, but feared that publicity might undermine public confidence and suppressed the report.

The Bank Act of August 1893 liquidated the Banca Romana and reformed the whole system of note issue, restricting the privilege to the new Banca d'Italia – mandated to liquidate the Banca Romana – and to the Banco di Napoli and the Banco di Sicilia, and providing for stricter state control. The new law failed to effect an improvement. Moreover, he irritated public opinion by raising to senatorial rank the governor of the Banca Romana, Bernardo Tanlongo, whose irregular practices had become a byword, which would have given him immunity from prosecution. The Senate declined to admit Tanlongo, whom Giolitti, in consequence of an intervention in parliament upon the condition of the Banca Romana, was obliged to arrest and prosecute. During the prosecution Giolitti abused his position as premier to abstract documents bearing on the case.

Simultaneously a parliamentary commission of inquiry investigated the condition of the state banks. Its report, though acquitting Giolitti of personal dishonesty, proved disastrous to his political position, and the ensuing Banca Romana scandal obliged him to resign. His fall left the finances of the state disorganized, the pensions fund depleted, diplomatic relations with France strained in consequence of the massacre of Italian workmen at Aigues-Mortes, and a state of revolt in the Lunigiana and by the Fasci Siciliani in Sicily, which he had proved impotent to suppress. Despite the heavy pressure from the King, the army and conservative circles in Rome, Giolitti neither treated strikes – which were not illegal – as a crime, nor dissolved the Fasci, nor authorised the use of firearms against popular demonstrations. His policy was “to allow these economic struggles to resolve themselves through amelioration of the condition of the workers” and not to interfere in the process.

== Parties and leaders ==
Party	Ideology	Leader
Historical Left	Liberalism	Francesco Crispi
Historical Right	Conservatism	Antonio Starabba di Rudinì
Historical Far Left	Radicalism	Felice Cavallotti

== Results ==
Party	Votes	%	Seats	+/–
Historical Left			323	−78
Historical Right			93	+45
Historical Far Left			56	+14
Others			36	+19
Total			508	0
Valid votes	1,655,397	97.76		
Invalid/blank votes	37,901	2.24		
Total votes	1,693,298	100.00		
Registered voters/turnout	2,934,445	57.70		
Source: Nohlen & Stöver
