= Historical Left =

Historical political faction in Italy

Historical Left Sinistra storica
- Leaders: Urbano Rattazzi; Agostino Depretis; Benedetto Cairoli; Francesco Crispi; Giovanni Giolitti
- Founded: 1849
- Dissolved: 1913
- Merged into: Liberals
- Ideology: Liberalism (Italian); Reformism; Italian nationalism Democratization
- Political position: Centre to centre-left

The Left group (Italian: Sinistra), later called Historical Left (Italian: Sinistra storica) by historians to distinguish it from the left-wing groups of the 20th century, was a liberal and reformist parliamentary group in Italy during the second half of the 19th century. The members of the Left were also known as Democrats or Ministerials. The Left was the dominant political group in the Kingdom of Italy from the 1870s until its dissolution in the early 1910s.

Different to its Right counterpart, the Left was the result of coalition who represented Northern and Southern middle class, urban bourgeoisie, small businessmen, journalists and academics. It also supported a right to vote and the public school for all children. Moreover, the party was against the high tax policies promoted by the Right. After the 1890s, the Left began to show more conservative tendencies, including advocating breaking strikes and protests and promoting an aggressive colonialist policy in Africa.

== History ==
=== Formation and consolidation ===
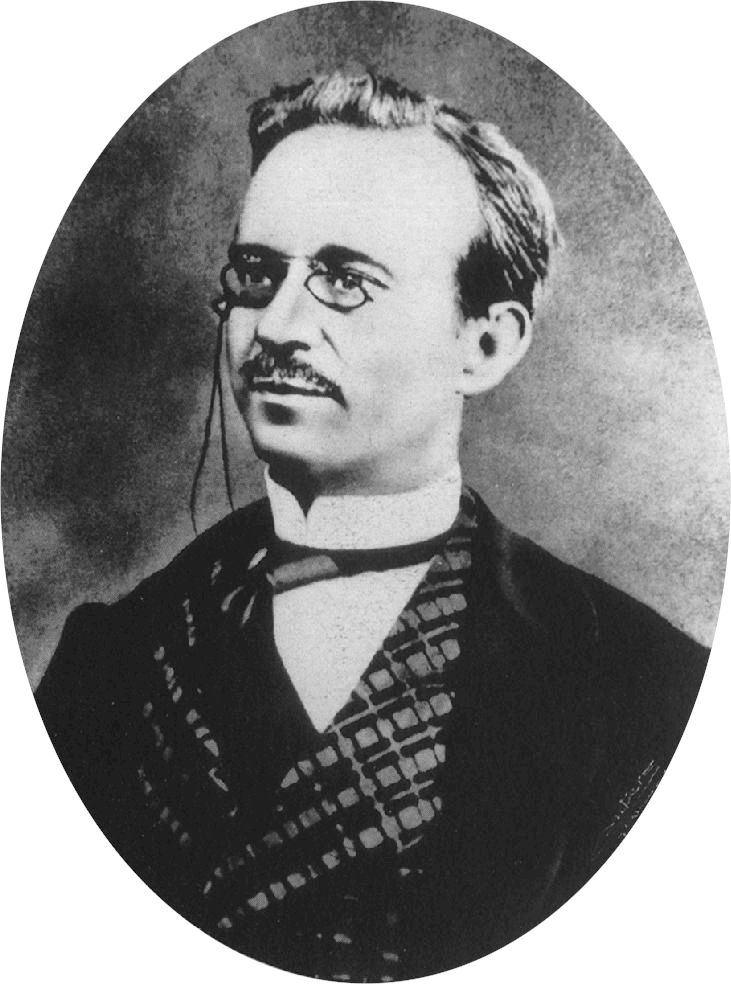
Urbano Rattazzi

The Left originated from a parliamentary group inside the Sardinian Parliament as the opposition to the right-wing government of the Marquess of Azeglio. It was not a structured party, but simply an opposition divided in two tendencies:

- The Moderates (majority) led by Urbano Rattazzi supported a parliamentary system, were pragmatic about Italian unification and favourable to cooperate with the Right dissident Count of Cavour.
- The Radicals (minority) led by Giuseppe Garibaldi supported a strong nationalism, democracy and tendency to republicanism.

The cooperation between Rattazzi and Cavour grew strong and the two plotted to oust D'Azeglio from office. After the 1851 self-coup of President Louis-Napoléon Bonaparte in France, the fake rumors about a same decision by the government caused the fall of D'Azeglio in 1852, orchestrated by Cavour and Rattazzi with the final goal of took the power, with Cavour becoming Prime Minister while Rattazzi became President of the Chamber of Deputies. This unusual coalition between Left and Right was sharply nicknamed Connubio Rattazzi–Cavour (literally "marriage") by conservative opposition.

The Sardinian intervention in the Crimean War, which Rattazzi opposed, caused the decline of the Left–Right coalition in 1855. After pressions by now-Emperor Napoleon III over Cavour in 1858, Rattazzi was forced to resign as Minister of the Interior because he was reputed to be too nationalist and intransigent about Italian unification, which Cavour intended only as a Sardinian–Piedmontese expansion. Despite the exclusion from the government, the Left and Rattazzi, thanks to his friendship with Rosa Vercellana, mistress of the King, rapidly gained Victor Emmanuel II's favour.

During the 1860s after the Italian unification, the Left was in opposition, but the turmoils of that age were also reflected inside the group, which was now divided into three main factions:

- The Third Party, led by Rattazzi, was characterized by liberalism and a tempered progressivism.
- The Great Centre, led by Agostino Depretis, and Agostino Bertani was ambivalent toward the Right and supporting constitutionalism and modernization, but was still in favor of retaining the monarchy.
- The Intransigents, led by Francesco Crispi, constituted by former members of the Action Party, supporting a left-populist near-republicanism.

=== Depretis and Cairoli ===
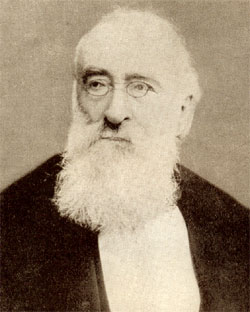
Agostino Depretis

After the death of Rattazzi in 1873, Depretis took over the leadership of the Left. In 1862, Depretis was briefly Minister of Public Works in a government led by Rattazzi with both Left and Right ministers. He justified the agreement with the Right by stating the following:

We cannot allow that majorities must remain unchangeable [...]. Ideas grow up with actions, and like science advance and the world moves, so parties are transforming. They also undergo the law of motion, the occurrence of transformations.

This statement was the basis of the phenomenon of trasformismo (literally transformism), which consists in a constant changing of political faction motivated by opportunity rather than ideals. In 1876, the Right Prime Minister Marco Minghetti lost parliamentary confidence thanks to an agreement between Depretis and liberist factions of the Right, opposed to the railways nationalization project. King Victor Emmanuel II verified the impossibility for the Right to gain confidence and nominated Depretis as prime minister, who formed a Left-only government. In November 1876, the legislative election confirmed the stability of the Left that gained the 56% of votes. The Depretis ministry realized a tax reform and tried to align Italy with Germany against the currently conservative France and Austria-Hungary, but after strong criticism for his decision to abolish the Ministry of Agriculture, Industry and Trade he resigned and was substituted by his rival Benedetto Cairoli in 1877. Differently by the pragmatic Depretis, Cairoli was a strong opponent of trasformismo, an irridentist and Francophile. Isolated by the European powers at the Congress of Berlin, Cairoli was forced to resign in 1878 after a failed life attempt to King Umberto I and after lesser than nine months of government. Despite a short break with a new Depretis cabinet (survived eight months), Cairoli formed a new executive with Depretis support in 1879. Despite the Left's electoral success in the election of 1880, the Cairoli ministry was unable to prevent the French conquest of the Beylik of Tunis in 1881 that resulted his political death, becoming unpopular with both Left and Right.

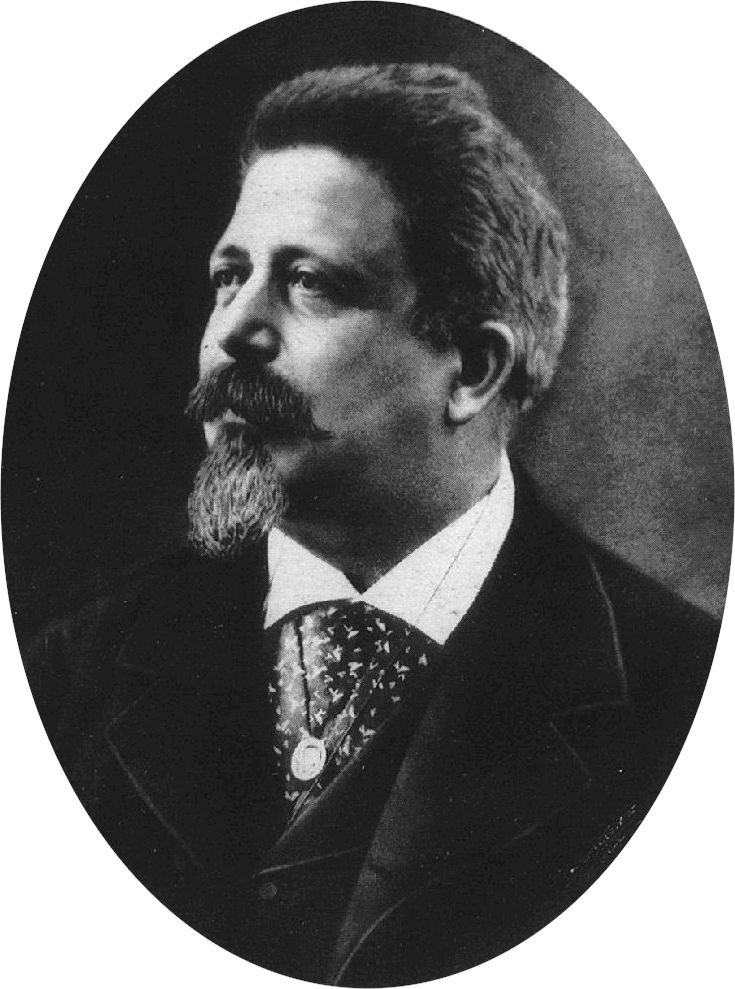
Benedetto Cairoli

The decline of Cairoli opened the door to Depretis, who was chosen to form a new government. During this long term from 1881 to 1887, the Left led by Depretis achieved a series of success, like the manhood suffrage toward the low-educated citizens and the adoption of protectionism to favour the development of textile, iron and steel industries while facing many internal and international troubles. Particularly, the executive faced the difficult relationship with Austria that showed an anti-Italian attitude despite the common adhesion to the Triple Alliance with Germany, and ended the Italian international isolation. Another problem was the rupture with the radical-progressive Left led by Giuseppe Zanardelli and Francesco Crispi, who formed with other dissidents The Pentarchy, allied with the Historical Far Left, forcing the majority to fully embrace the trasformismo, opening the government to the Right. Depretis was also unable to start a colonial empire in Africa after the defeat in the Battle of Dogali in 1887. Despite the victory in the election of 1886, the Left was tested by decline of traformismo, with many opportunist Right politicians who joined in the Liberal Constitutional Party, causing the necessity of Depretis to find an agreement with Crispi and Zanardelli.

=== Crispi, Giolitti and dissolution ===
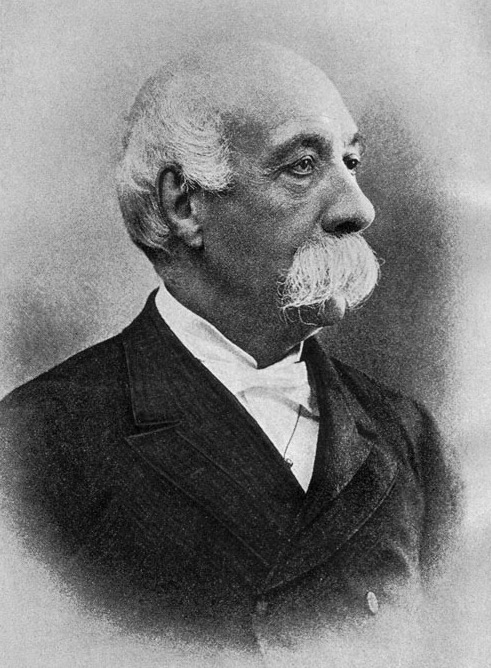
Francesco Crispi

In 1887, the longtime Depretis died in office and Zanardelli and Crispi were favoured for the succession. King Umberto I finally chose the radical Crispi because he was more favourable to an alliance with Germany rather than progressive Zanardelli. Internally, Crispi reformed justice, supporting a law against administrative abuses and introducing the Zanardelli Code (named after the now Justice Minister), expanded the suffrage for the communal voters, obtained more executive powers for the government, established undersecretaries in the several ministries and created the Health Superior Council. Despite Crispi being more leftist than Depretis, he was also a strong nationalist and rapidly became near to German chancellor Otto von Bismarck and the Germanophile King Umberto II. Crispi wanted reunite all the Italian-speaking territories in one nation, revealing to the German general Alfred von Waldersee his desire to annex the Austrian Trentino and French Nice. Despite his successes, Crispi lost the parliamentary confidence in 1891 after a failed attempt to reduce state expensens and prefecture against the interests of many politicians.

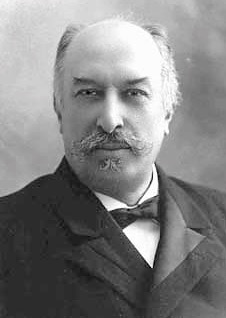
Giovanni Giolitti

During the momentary isolation of Crispi, the former treasury minister Giovanni Giolitti took over the Left leadership. By contrast with the statist Crispi, Giolitti was a liberal like Zanardelli and did not support colonialism and militarization. After the fall of the conservative government of the Marquess of Rudinì in 1892, Giolitti was designated to form a new government. As prime minister, Giolitti tried to introduce a progressive taxation and stop the trasformismo with the establishment of an organized political party. However, the Giolitti ministry did not survive long and after nine months of stability in January 1893 the Banca Romana scandal erupted, which involved many politicians of the Left, including Giolitti and Crispi. After months of polemics, Giolitti resigned in December 1893.

After that short parenthesis, Crispi was re-nominated prime minister despite the critics for his involvement in the Banca Romana scandal. One of the first acts of the government was the reduction of state expenses together with income, land, salt and treasury bill taxes to face the economic crisis. Despite the initial Left tendencies, Crispi got worried about the Italian Socialist Party and after the suppression of the labour movement of the Fasci Siciliani the executive changed the electoral law, permitting the vote only to the literate citizens, excluding 800,000 voters. At the same time, Crispi tried to re-obtain popular support prosecuting a colonialist policy in Africa, consolidating the acquisition of Somaliland and Eritrea and starting the First Abyssinian War in 1894. Despite the initial successes, the Italian campaign resulted disastrous, with ruinous defeats at Amba Alagi in 1895 and Adwa in 1896. The last confirmed the end of the Crispi's political rule, who resigned from office. The Crispi's resignation and the impairment of many members of the majority after the Banca Romana scandal, confirmed the end of the Left. The Left's remnants now constituted the Ministerial bloc inside the Parliament led by Giolitti, who finally realized the fusion between Right and Left in the Liberal Union in 1913.

== Electoral results ==
Chamber of Deputies
Election year	Votes	%	Seats	+/–	Leader
1861	48,875 (2nd)	20.4	62 / 443	–	Urbano Rattazzi
1865	98,708 (2nd)	35.2	156 / 443	▲94	Urbano Rattazzi
1867	126,202 (1st)	43.0	225 / 493	▲69	Urbano Rattazzi
1870	92,499 (2nd)	28.8	195 / 493	▼30	Urbano Rattazzi
1874	150,119 (2nd)	46.4	232 / 508	▲37	Agostino Depretis
1876	243,319 (1st)	70.2	424 / 508	▲182	Agostino Depretis
1880	146,096 (1st)	40.7	218 / 508	▼196	Agostino Depretis
1882	695,147 (1st)	56.8	289 / 508	▲71	Agostino Depretis
1886	804,187 (1st)	57.5	292 / 508	▲3	Agostino Depretis
1890	1,165,489 (1st)	78.9	401 / 508	▲109	Francesco Crispi
1892	1,075,244 (1st)	63.5	323 / 508	▼78	Giovanni Giolitti
1895	713,812 (1st)	58.6	334 / 508	▲11	Francesco Crispi
1897	799,517 (1st)	64.3	327 / 508	▼7	Giovanni Giolitti
1900	663,418 (1st)	52.3	296 / 508	▼31	Giovanni Giolitti
1904	777,345 (1st)	50.9	339 / 508	▲43	Giovanni Giolitti
1909	995,290 (1st)	54.4	336 / 508	▼3	Giovanni Giolitti

== Bibliography ==
- Cammarano, Fulvio (2011). Laterza (ed.). Storia dell'Italia liberale. Gius.Laterza & Figli Spa. ISBN 9788842095996.
- Giordano, Giancarlo (2008). Aracne (ed.). Cilindri e feluche. La politica estera dell'Italia dopo l'Unità. Aracne. ISBN 9788854817333.
- Duggan, Christopher (2000). Laterza (ed.). Creare la nazione. Vita di Francesco Crispi. Editori Laterza. ISBN 9788842062196.
- Giolitti, Giovanni (1952). Einaudi (ed.). Discorsi extraparlamentari: saggio introduttivo di Nino Valeri.
- Gori, Annarita (2014). Franco Angeli (ed.). Tra patria e campanile. Ritualità civili e culture politiche a Firenze in età giolittiana. FrancoAngeli. ISBN 9788891707505.
- Baranski, Zygmunt G.; West, Rebecca J. (2001). CUP (ed.). The Cambridge Companion to Modern Italian Culture. Cambridge University Press. ISBN 9780521550345.
