= 1895 Italian general election =

- 26 May 1895 (first round); 2 June 1895 (second round)

All 508 seats in the Chamber of Deputies 255 seats needed for a majority
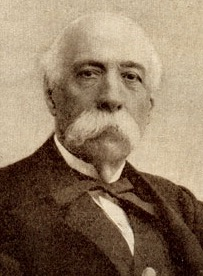

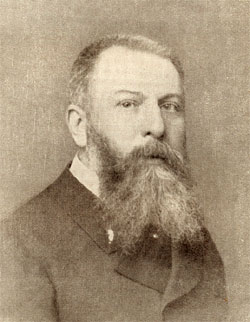

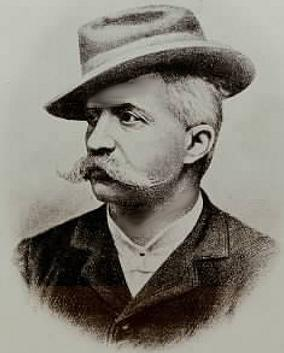

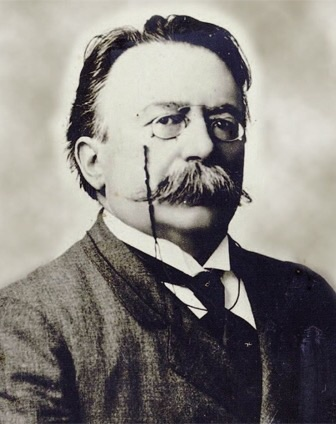
	Majority party	Minority party
Leader	Francesco Crispi	Antonio Starabba di Rudinì
Party	Historical Left	Historical Right
Seats won	334	104
Seat change	▲11	▲11
Popular vote	713,812	263,315
Percentage	58.57%	21.61%
	Third party	Fourth party
Leader	Felice Cavallotti	Andrea Costa
Party	Historical Far Left	Socialist
Seats won	47	15
Seat change	▲20	New
Popular vote	142,356	82,523
Percentage	11.68%	6.77%
Prime Minister before election
Giovanni Giolitti
Historical Left
Elected Prime Minister
Francesco Crispi
Historical Left

General elections were held in Italy on 26 May 1895, with a second round of voting on 2 June. The "ministerial" left-wing bloc remained the largest in Parliament, winning 334 of the 508 seats.

== Background ==
In December 1893 the impotence of the Giovanni Giolitti cabinet to restore public order, menaced by disturbances in Sicily and the Banca Romana scandal, gave rise to a general demand that Francesco Crispi should return to power. Although Giolitti tried to put a halt to the manifestations and protests of the Fasci Siciliani, his measures were relatively mild. In the three weeks of uncertainty before Crispi formed a government on 15 December 1893, the rapid spread of violence drove many local authorities to defy Giolitti’s ban on the use of firearms. In December 1893 92 peasants lost their lives in clashes with the police and army. Government building were burned as well as flour mills and bakeries that refused to lower their prices when taxes were lowered or abolished.

On 3 January 1894 Crispi declared a state of siege throughout Sicily. Army reservists were recalled and General Roberto Morra di Lavriano was dispatched with 40,000 troops. The old order was restored through the use of extreme force, including summary executions. A solidarity revolt of anarchists and republicans in the Lunigiana was crushed as well.

The repression of the Fasci turned into outright persecution. The government arrested not just the leaders of the movement, but masses of poor farmers, students, professionals, sympathizers of the Fasci, and even those simply suspected of having sympathized with the movement at some point in time, in many cases without any evidence for the accusations. After the declaration of the state of emergency, condemnations were issued for the paltriest of reasons. Many rioters were incarcerated for having shouted things such as "Viva l'anarchia" or "down with the King". At Palermo, in April and May 1894, the trials against the central committee of the Fasci took place and this was the final blow that signaled the death knell of the movement of the Fasci Siciliani.

On 16 June 1894 the anarchist Paolo Lega tried to shoot Crispi but the attempt failed. On 24 June an Italian anarchist killed French President Carnot. In this climate of increased the fear of anarchism, Crispi was able to introduce a series of anti-anarchist laws in July 1894, which were also used against socialists. Heavy penalties were announced for "incitement to class hatred" and police received extended powers of preventive arrest and deportation.

Crispi steadily supported the energetic remedies adopted by his Minister of Finance Sidney Sonnino to save Italian credit, which had been severely shaken the financial crisis of 1892–1893 and the Banca Romana scandal. In 1894 he was threatened with expulsion from the Masonic Grande Oriente d'Italia for being too friendly towards the Catholic Church. He had previously been strongly anticlerical but had become convinced of the need for rapprochement with the Papacy.

Crispi's uncompromising suppression of disorder, and his refusal to abandon either the Triple Alliance or the Eritrean colony, or to forsake his Minister of the Treasury, Sidney Sonnino, caused a breach with the radical leader Felice Cavallotti. Cavallotti began a pitiless campaign of defamation against him. The unsuccessful attempt upon Crispi’s life by the anarchist Lega brought a momentary truce, but Cavallotti’s attacks were soon renewed more fiercely than ever. They produced little effect and the general election of 1895 gave Crispi a huge majority. Nevertheless, the humiliating defeat of the Italian army at Adwa in March 1896 in Ethiopia during First Italo-Ethiopian War, brought about his resignation after riots broke out in several Italian towns.

== Parties and leaders ==
Party	Ideology	Leader
Historical Left	Liberalism	Francesco Crispi
Historical Right	Conservatism	Antonio Starabba di Rudinì
Historical Far Left	Radicalism	Felice Cavallotti
Italian Socialist Party	Socialism	Andrea Costa

== Results ==
Party	Votes	%	Seats	+/–
Historical Left	713,812	58.57	334	+11
Historical Right	263,315	21.61	104	+11
Historical Far Left	142,356	11.68	47	+20
Italian Socialist Party	82,523	6.77	15	New
Others	16,761	1.38	8	−28
Total	1,218,767	100.00	508	0
Valid votes	1,218,767	97.02		
Invalid/blank votes	37,477	2.98		
Total votes	1,256,244	100.00		
Registered voters/turnout	2,120,185	59.25		
Source: National Institute of Statistics
