= 1865 Italian general election =

- 22 October 1865 (first round); 29 October 1865 (second round)

All 443 seats in the Chamber of Deputies 222 seats needed for a majority
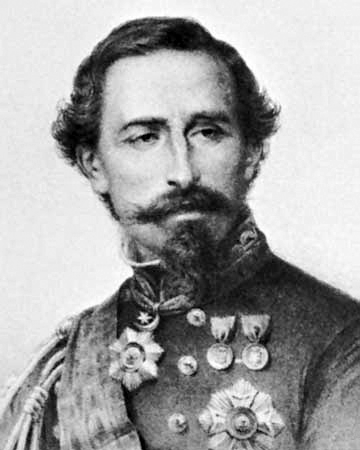

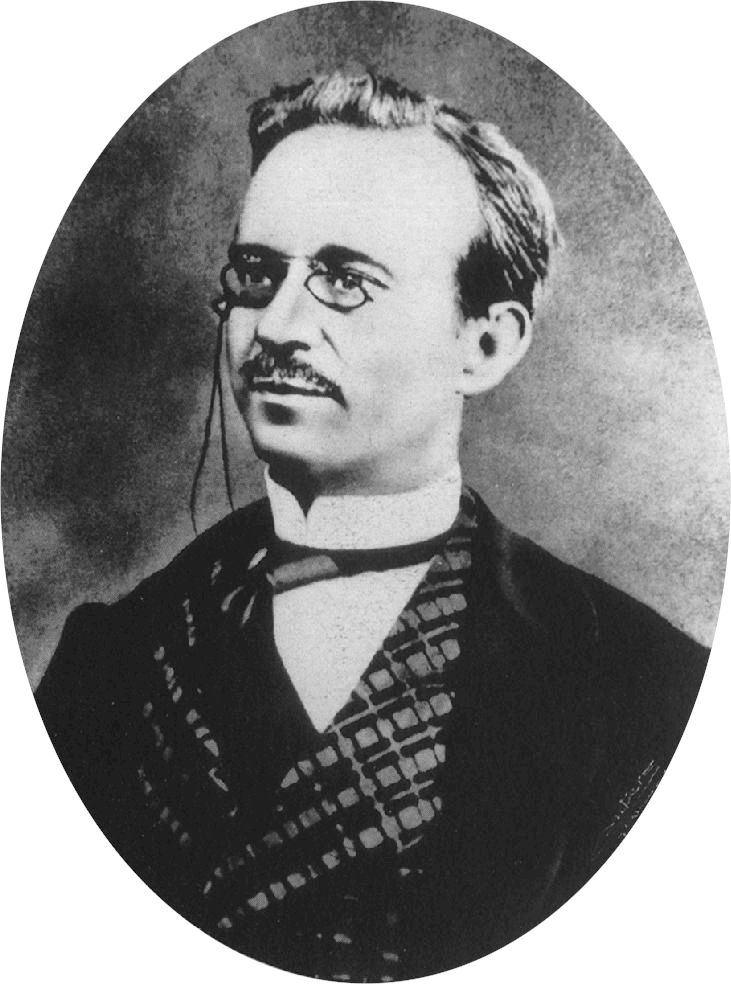

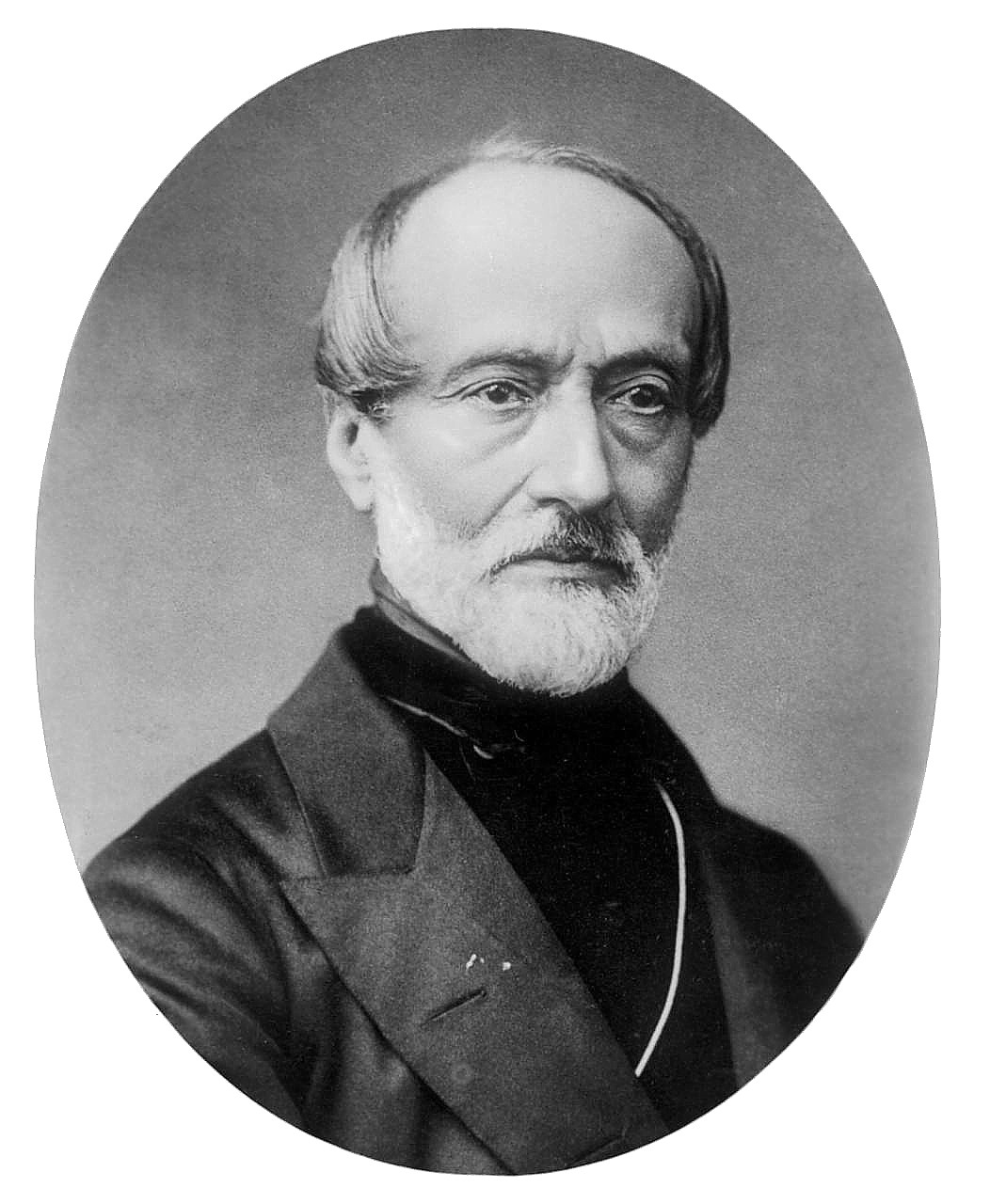
	Majority party	Minority party	Third party
Leader	Alfonso Ferrero La Marmora	Urbano Rattazzi	Giuseppe Mazzini
Party	Historical Right	Historical Left	Historical Far Left
Seats won	183	156	14
- Constituencies used for the elections
Prime Minister before election
Alfonso Ferrero La Marmora
Historical Right
Elected Prime Minister
Alfonso Ferrero La Marmora
Historical Right

General elections were held in Italy on 22 October 1865, with a second round of voting taking place on 29 October. These were only the second general election in the history of Italy, the first one having taken place in 1861.

== Electoral campaign ==
The Historical Right was led by the former Prime Minister of the Kingdom of Sardinia, Alfonso Ferrero La Marmora, a long-time general who fought during the Italian unification.

On the other hand, the bloc of the Historical Left was led by Urbano Rattazzi, a liberal politician who was between the founders of the Italian left-wing parliamentary group.

In opposition to the two main blocs there were a third party known as The Extreme, a far-left coalition, under the leadership of Giuseppe Mazzini, an Italian revolutionary and a key figure of the Unification.

On 22 and 29 October only 504,263 men of a total population of around 23 million were entitled to vote. Right-wing candidates emerged as the largest bloc in Parliament with around 41% of the 443 seats. They were largely aristocrats representing rentiers from the north of the country, and held moderate political views including loyalty to the crown and low government spending; the general La Marmora was appointed prime minister by the king Victor Emmanuel II.

== Parties and leaders ==
Party	Ideology	Leader
Historical Right	Conservatism	Alfonso Ferrero La Marmora
Historical Left	Liberalism	Urbano Rattazzi
Historical Far Left	Radicalism	Giuseppe Mazzini

== Results ==
Party	Votes	%	Seats
Historical Right			183
Historical Left			156
Historical Far Left			14
Others			90
Total			443
Valid votes	259,035	95.26	
Invalid/blank votes	12,888	4.74	
Total votes	271,923	100.00	
Registered voters/turnout	504,263	53.92	
Source: Nohlen & Stöver
