= 1900 Italian general election =

- 3 June 1900 (first round); 10 June 1900 (second round)

All 508 seats in the Chamber of Deputies 255 seats needed for a majority
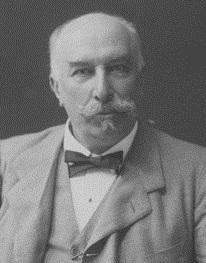

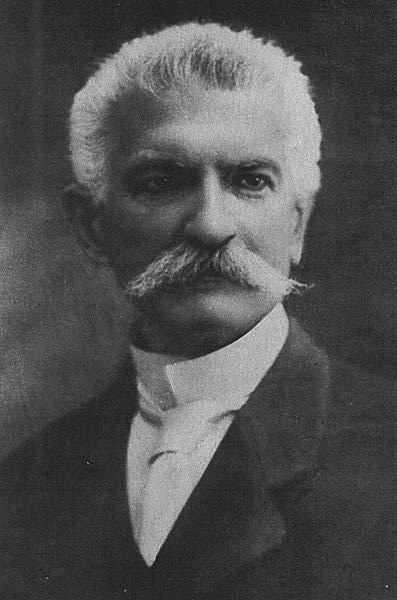

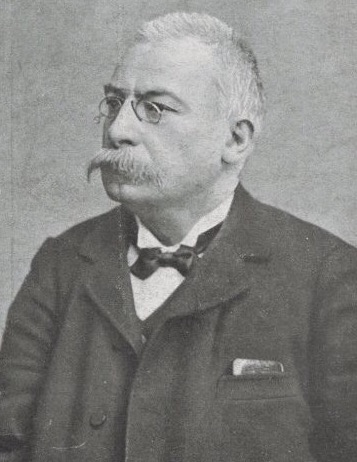

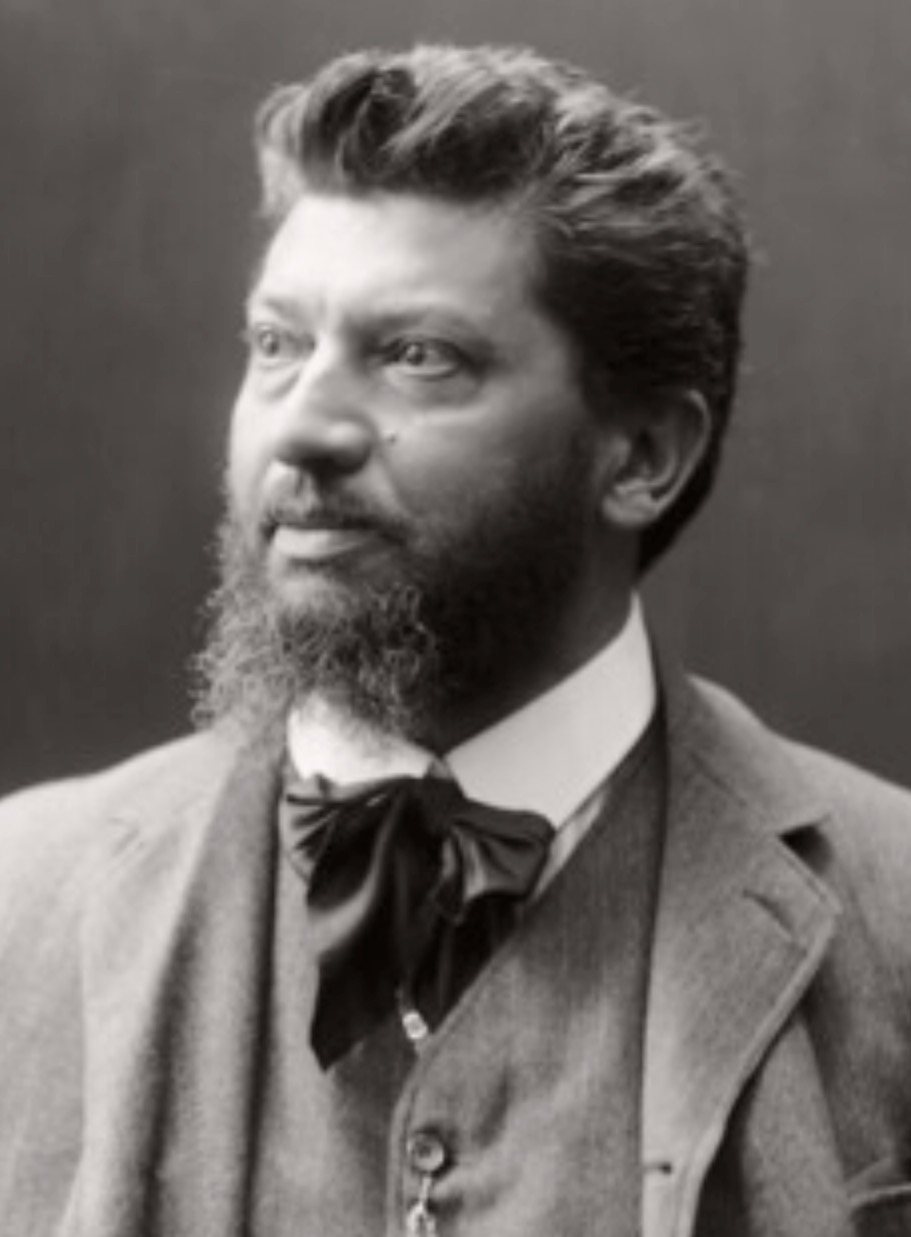

	Majority party	Minority party	Third party
Leader	Giovanni Giolitti	Sidney Sonnino	Ettore Sacchi
Party	Historical Left	Historical Right	Historical Far Left
Seats won	296	116	34
Seat change	▼33	▲17	▼8
Popular vote	663,418	271,698	89,872
Percentage	52.3%	21.4%	7.1%
Swing	▼12.0 pp	▲2.0 pp	▼1.1 pp
	Fourth party	Fifth party
Leader	Filippo Turati	Napoleone Colajanni
Party	PSI	PRI
Seats won	33	29
Seat change	▲29	▲4
Popular vote	164,946	79,127
Percentage	13.0%	6.2%
Swing	▲10.0 pp	▲0.4 pp
Prime Minister before election
Luigi Pelloux
Military
Subsequent Prime Minister
Giuseppe Saracco
Historical Left

General elections were held in Italy on 3 June 1900, with a second round of voting on 10 June. The "ministerial" left-wing bloc remained the largest in Parliament, winning 296 of the 508 seats.

== Background ==
Upon the fall of Antonio Starabba di Rudinì in June 1898, General Luigi Pelloux was entrusted by King Umberto with the formation of a cabinet, and took for himself the post of minister of the interior. He resigned office in May 1899 over his Chinese policy, but was again entrusted with the formation of a government. His new cabinet was essentially military and conservative, the most decisively conservative since 1876.

He took stern measures against the revolutionary elements in southern Italy. The Public Safety Bill for the reform of the police laws, taken over by him from the Rudinì cabinet, and eventually promulgated by royal decree. The law made strikes by state employees illegal; gave the executive wider powers to ban public meetings and dissolve subversive organisations; revived the penalties of banishment and preventive arrest for political offences; and tightened control of the press by making authors responsible for their articles and declaring incitement to violence a crime. The new coercive law was fiercely obstructed by the Socialist Party of Italy (PSI), which, with the Left and Extreme Left, succeeded in forcing General Pelloux to dissolve the Chamber in May 1900, and to resign office after the general election in June.

== Electoral system ==
The election was held using 508 single-member constituencies. However, prior to the election the electoral law was amended so that candidates needed only an absolute majority of votes to win their constituency, abolishing the second requirement of receiving the votes of at least one-sixth of registered voters.

== Parties and leaders ==
Party	Ideology	Leader
Historical Left	Liberalism	Giovanni Giolitti
Historical Right	Conservatism	Sidney Sonnino
Italian Socialist Party	Socialism	Filippo Turati
Radical opposition	Radicalism	Ettore Sacchi
Italian Republican Party	Republicanism	Napoleone Colajanni

== Results ==
Party	Votes	%	Seats	+/–
Historical Left	663,418	52.28	296	−33
Historical Right	271,698	21.41	116	+17
Italian Socialist Party	164,946	13.00	33	+18
Historical Far Left	89,872	7.08	34	−8
Italian Republican Party	79,127	6.24	29	+4
Total	1,269,061	100.00	508	0
Valid votes	1,269,061	97.03		
Invalid/blank votes	38,888	2.97		
Total votes	1,307,949	100.00		
Registered voters/turnout	2,248,509	58.17		
Source: National Institute of Statistics
