= 1886 Italian general election =

- 23 May 1886 (first round); 30 May 1886 (second round)

All 508 seats in the Chamber of Deputies 255 seats needed for a majority
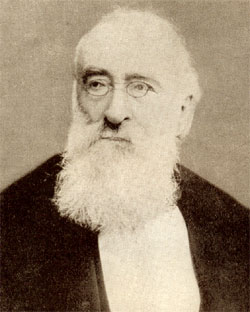

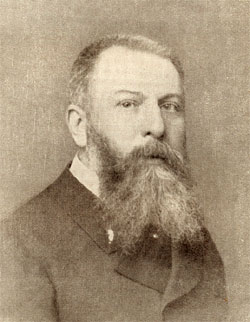

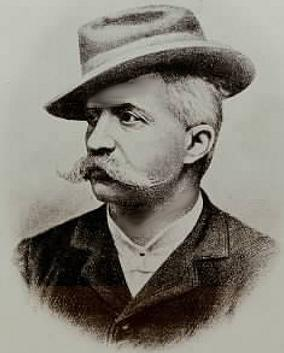

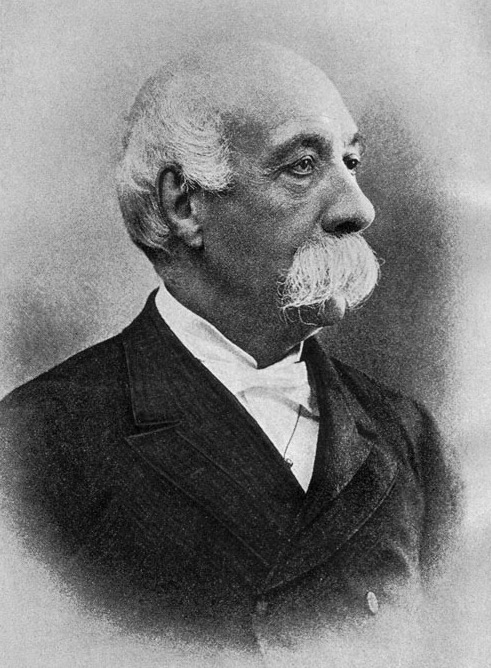
	Majority party	Minority party
Leader	Agostino Depretis	Antonio Starabba di Rudinì
Party	Historical Left	Historical Right
Seats won	292	145
Seat change	▲3	▼2
	Third party	Fourth party
Leader	Felice Cavallotti	Francesco Crispi
Party	Historical Far Left	Dissident Left
Seats won	45	26
Seat change	▲1	▲7
Prime Minister before election
Agostino Depretis
Historical Left
Elected Prime Minister
Agostino Depretis
Historical Left

General elections were held in Italy on 23 May 1886, with a second round of voting on 30 May. The "ministerial" left-wing bloc emerged as the largest in Parliament, winning 292 of the 508 seats. As in 1882, the elections were held using small multi-member constituencies of between two and five seats.

== Electoral system ==
As in 1882, the election was held using small multi-member constituencies with between two and five seats.

== Campaign ==
The Historical Left was led by the Prime Minister of Italy, Agostino Depretis, a prominent member of the Italian politics for decades. Depretis had been head of the government since 1881 and also from 1876 to 1879.

The leader of the Historical Right was Antonio Starabba di Rudinì, a conservative marchese from Sicily.

The Historical Far-Left was led by Felice Cavallotti, a famous Italian poet.

The Left emerged as the largest in Italian Parliament, winning 292 of the 508 seats, before the Right, which gained 145 seats.

== Parties and leaders ==
Party	Ideology	Leader
Historical Left	Liberalism	Agostino Depretis
Historical Right	Conservatism	Antonio Starabba di Rudinì
Historical Far Left	Radicalism	Felice Cavallotti
Dissident Left	Progressivism	Francesco Crispi

== Results ==
Party	Votes	%	Seats	+/–
Historical Left			292	+3
Historical Right			145	−2
Historical Far Left			45	+1
Dissident Left			26	+7
Total			508	0
Valid votes	1,399,072	98.82		
Invalid/blank votes	16,729	1.18		
Total votes	1,415,801	100.00		
Registered voters/turnout	2,420,327	58.50		
Source: Nohlen & Stöver
