= Historical Right =

Historical political faction in Italy

Historical Right Destra storica
- Leaders: Massimo d'Azeglio; Camillo Benso di Cavour; Bettino Ricasoli; Giovanni Lanza; Marco Minghetti; Antonio Starabba di Rudinì; Sidney Sonnino
- Founded: 1849
- Dissolved: 1913
- Preceded by: Moderate Party
- Merged into: Liberals
- Ideology: Liberal conservatism Conservative liberalism Conservatism; Classical liberalism Monarchism
- Political position: Centre to centre-right

The Right group (Italian: Destra), later called Historical Right (Italian: Destra storica) by historians to distinguish it from the right-wing groups of the 20th century, was an Italian conservative parliamentary group during the second half of the 19th century. After 1876, the Historical Right constituted the Constitutional opposition toward the left governments. It originated in the convergence of the most liberal faction of the moderate right and the moderate wing of the democratic left. The party included men from heterogeneous cultural, class, and ideological backgrounds, ranging from British-American individualist liberalism to Neo-Hegelian liberalism as well as liberal-conservatives, from strict secularists to more religiously-oriented reformists. Few prime ministers after 1852 were party men; instead they accepted support where they could find it, and even the governments of the Historical Right during the 1860s included leftists in some capacity.

The Right represented the interests of the Northern bourgeoisie and the Southern aristocracy. Its members were mostly large landowners, industrialists and people related to the military. On economic issues, the Right supported free trade and laissez-faire policies while on social issues it favoured a strong central government, obligatory conscription and during the Cavour era the secular Law of Guarantees, causing Pope Pius IX's Non Expedit policy of abstention. In foreign relations, their goal was the unification of Italy, primarily aiming for an alliance with the British Empire and the French Empire, but sometimes also with the German Empire against Austria-Hungary. In the last decades of its history, the Right was often referred to as Constitutional Opposition.

== History ==
=== Origins ===
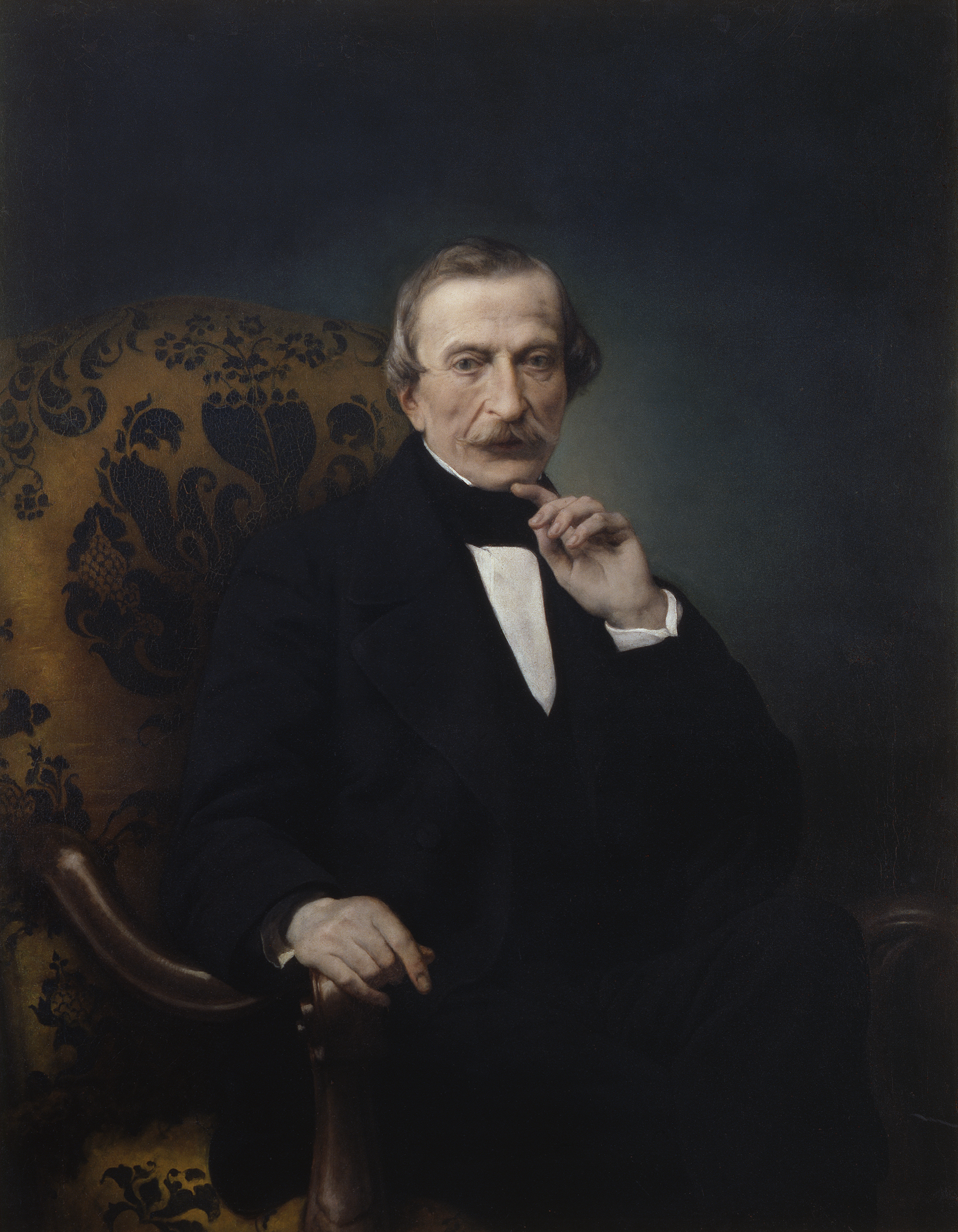
Massimo D'Azeglio

The origins of the Historical Right are in the right-wing faction of the Sardinian Parliament, established in 1849. The Right was at the time led by Massimo d'Azeglio, who was also a representative of the moderate movement that tried to unify Italy as a federation of states. As the Right dominated the Parliament, D'Azeglio was appointed as Prime Minister of Sardinia by King Victor Emmanuel II. However, there were tensions inside the group caused by D'Azeglio's assertiveness towards the Catholic Church and the King. The tensions caused the group to split into two separate factions:

- The Conservatives, led by D'Azeglio, Luigi Cibrario, General La Marmora and Carlo Bon Compagni, who supported compromises with the Church and a slow Italian unification.
- The Liberals, led by Cavour, Luigi Carlo Farini and Giovanni Galvagno, who supported the expropriation of the Church's goods, a lesser role of the King in government and French intervention to achieve Italian unification.

In May 1852, Cavour and his supporters left the Right group and moved toward the moderate Left led by Urbano Rattazzi. The duo Rattazzi–Cavour made an alliance (pejoratively called "a marriage"), forming a centrist group called the Connubio. D'Azeglio was forced to resign in November 1852 and Cavour was appointed by the King as the new prime minister, ending the Sardinian phase of the Right.

=== Unification and governments ===
The Count of Cavour

In 1861, Italy was united as a Kingdom under the House of Savoy. Cavour, who was Prime Minister of Sardinia since November 1852 with brief interruptions, became the first Prime Minister of Italy. During the first year after unification, Cavour became more conservative as many radicals and republicans refused to recognize the new government, but instead recognize the Southern Army led by Giuseppe Garibaldi. Fearing a democratic revolution, Cavour became near to the new Right group in the Italian Parliament and led it until his premature death in June 1861. The Cavourian policies were partially continued by his successors aligned with the Right group like Luigi Farini, Bettino Ricasoli and Marco Minghetti. Starting in 1861, the Right's government pursued a policy of a balanced budget, maintained with austerity and high taxation. The taxes, especially the tax on grains, were unpopular among the rural and middle classes. As a result, the Right progressively lost its support. With that, the Right was split, with the original Northern liberals supporting the taxation and the newly arrived Southern conservatives who opposed the modernization and taxation.

In the 1870s, in a time of rising tensions inside the Right governments, the group split into different factions for specific goals and territorial composition:

- The Emilian clique led by Marco Minghetti representing Emilian parochialism, in addition to supporting protectionism, moderate liberalism, and alignment with Germany.
- The Piedmontese clique led by Giovanni Lanza and Gustavo Ponza di San Martino representing Piedmontese parochialism, supporting liberalism and a moderate Francophilic foreign policy.
- The Tuscan clique led by Ubaldino Peruzzi representing Tuscan parochialism, favourable to liberalism and modernization. Hostile to Minghetti, but vague toward the Left.
- The Lombardian clique led by Cesare Correnti representing the Lombardian parochialism along with centrists and secularists and those favourable to cooperation with the Left.

On 25 March 1876, Prime Minister Marco Minghetti was forced to resign after the so-called Parliamentary Revolution. The Left, together with dissident members from the Right, put the government into a minority because of the tax on grains' question, which damaged the rural economy. Ironically, many Right politicians who sided now with Left were from the North. Since this moment, the Right fell into opposition and Agostino Depretis, leader of the Left, was appointed as the new prime minister.

=== Constitutional opposition ===
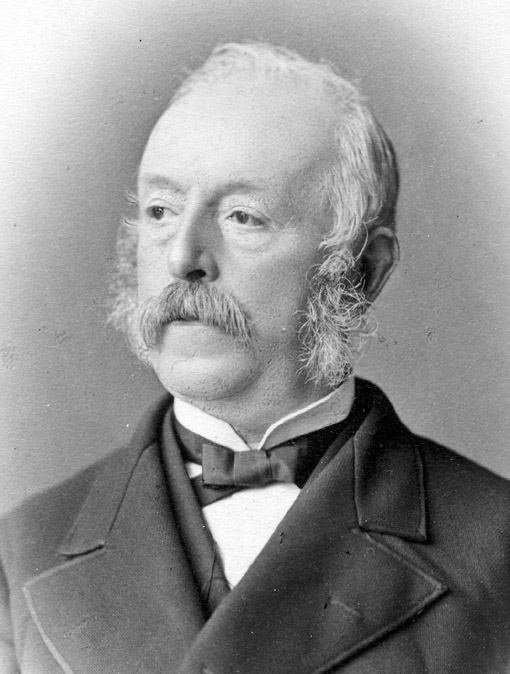
Marco Minghetti

After the fall of Minghetti, the Right progressively saw splits and disbanded. On 8 October 1882, some weeks before the general elections, Depretis proclaimed that anyone who was willing to become a progressive would be accepted into his government. Surprisingly, Minghetti agreed with this, causing various individuals in the Right to join the Left. After this event, the rest of the anti-compromise Right was called the Liberal Constitutional Party or "Constitutional opposition" led by former Finance Minister Quintino Sella and Interior Minister Antonio Starabba, Marquess of Rudinì. The Constitutionals were not a structured and organized party, but simply a coalition of both Northern and Southern conservatives like Sidney Sonnino, Luigi Luzzatti and Pasquale Villari who rejected perceived opportunism and Depretis' protectionist policies.

After ten years in opposition, the Constitutionals gained the majority thanks to an agreement with dissident Left Giovanni Nicotera and radical Felice Cavallotti and Rudinì was charged to form a new government in substitution of Francesco Crispi. During his short government, overthrown after one year, Rudinì worked to reduce to public expenditure, limit the rising imperialist sentiment and keep Italy aligned with the Triple Alliance. Rudinì was recalled in office after the political fall of Crispi, following the defeat in the First Italo-Ethiopian War. During this second term, Rudinì worked to repress the Sicilian Fasci, a powerful rising socialist protest in Sicily, but also several nationalist groups. After two years, Rudinì was ousted from office after his unpopular ceding of Kassala to the United Kingdom. Constitutional politicians like Luzzatti and Sonnino later formed their own governments, but they were short, and were weakened by the newborn Italian Socialist Party and the first organized political parties. The awareness of that forced the Constitutionals to join in the Liberal Union in 1913, a political alliance between various liberal politicians, many of whom were previously opposed to each other.

== Electoral results ==
Chamber of Deputies
Election year	Votes	%	Seats	+/–	Leader
1861	110,400 (1st)	46.1	342 / 443	–	Camillo Benso di Cavour
1865	114,208 (1st)	41.2	183 / 443	▼159	Alfonso La Marmora
1867	84,685 (2nd)	39.2	151 / 493	▼32	Bettino Ricasoli
1870	110,525 (1st)	37.2	233 / 508	▲82	Giovanni Lanza
1874	156,784 (1st)	53.6	276 / 508	▲43	Marco Minghetti
1876	97,726 (2nd)	28.2	94 / 508	▼182	Marco Minghetti
1880	135,797 (2nd)	37.9	171 / 508	▲77	Marco Minghetti
1882	353,693 (2nd)	28.9	147 / 508	▼24	Marco Minghetti
1886	399,295 (2nd)	27.9	145 / 508	▼2	Silvio Spaventa
1890	138,854 (2nd)	9.4	48 / 508	▼97	Antonio Starabba di Rudinì
1892	309,873 (2nd)	18.3	93 / 508	▲45	Antonio Starabba di Rudinì
1895	263,315 (2nd)	21.6	104 / 508	▲11	Antonio Starabba di Rudinì
1897	242,090 (2nd)	19.4	99 / 508	▼5	Antonio Starabba di Rudinì
1900	271,698 (2nd)	21.4	116 / 508	▲17	Sidney Sonnino
1904	212,584 (3rd)	13.9	76 / 508	▼20	Sidney Sonnino
1909	108,029 (4th)	5.9	44 / 508	▼32	Sidney Sonnino
