= Agostino Bertani =

Italian politician

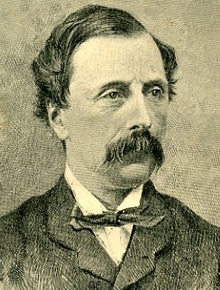

Member of Chamber of Deputies
- In office 22 November 1882 – 27 April 1886
- Constituency: Milan
- In office 18 February 1861 – 2 May 1880
- Constituency: Milan (1861–1865); Milazzo (1865–1874); Pizzighettone (1874–1876); Rimini (1876–1880)

Personal details
- Born: 19 October 1812 Milan, Kingdom of Italy
- Died: 30 April 1886 (aged 73) Rome, Kingdom of Italy
- Party: Historical Far Left
- Occupation: Physician

Agostino Bertani (19 October 1812 – 30 April 1886) was an Italian revolutionary and medical doctor during Italian unification. He played a significant role in the development of Italy's public healthcare system during the 19th century. He is best known for organising medical services for Garibaldi's army and for co-founding the radical party Estrema sinistra storica. He was a close collaborator of Mazzini and Garibaldi. His contribution to the unification of Italy resulted in participation in most of the important military campaigns of the era.

== Revolutionary ==
=== Education and early life ===
Bertani was born in Milan on 19 October 1812. His father was an administrator for the Napoleonic government of Lombardy. He was raised in a liberal environment. He graduated as a surgeon from the University of Pavia in 1835 where he studied medicine and surgery.

Upon completing his studies, he embarked on a year-long educational journey through Germany and France to acquaint himself with the latest advances in European medicine. He settled down in 1839 to work as a surgeon in Milan. By 1848, he had been named the chief surgeon at the Ospedale Maggiore of Milan. In 1842, Bertani founded the Gazzetta Medica Italiana, which became an important organ for disseminating contemporary medical knowledge in the country.

=== Five Days of Milan and the First War of Independence ===
With the outbreak of the revolutions of 1848, he participated in the leadership. He fearlessly advocated for democracy, and thus was opposed to the fusion of Lombard republic with the Kingdom of Sardinia. He was appointed chief surgeon of the Sant'Ambrogio military hospital, where he provided medical care to wounded insurgents fighting against Austrian forces.

After the suppression of the revolt and the restoration of Austrian control, Bertani was forced into exile in Switzerland. Exiled from Lombardy, he gravitated to the Roman Republic of 1849, where, as medical officer, he organised another ambulance service similar to one he had established previously in Milan.

After the fall of Rome, he withdrew to Genoa, where he worked with James Hudson, a British diplomat and supporter of Italian independence, for the freedom of Neapolitan political prisoners. He also worked with Giuseppe Mazzini. He gained further recognition during the cholera epidemic of 1854, when he coordinated public health measures to combat the outbreak. In 1859, he founded a revolutionary journal at Genoa.

=== Expedition of the Thousand and military career ===
Following Garibaldi's capture of Naples in September 1860, Bertani was appointed secretary general of the provisional government. In this capacity, he reorganised the police force, abolished the secret services, founded twelve orphanages, prepared measures for the suppression of certain religious orders, and planned the sanitary reconstruction of the city.

At the outbreak of the Second Italian War of Independence in 1859, he joined as surgeon for the Garibaldian corps of the Cacciatori delle Alpi. After the war ended with the Conference of Villafranca, he became one of the organisers of the Expedition of the Thousand against the Kingdom of the Two Sicilies. Remaining at Genoa after Garibaldi's departure for Marsala, he organised four separate volunteer corps, two of which were intended for Sicily and two for the Papal States. The Sardinian Prime Minister, Camillo Cavour, however, commanded all four corps to sail for Sicily. Bertani allocated many of his efforts to organise a democratic republican Italy, merging the energies of Mazzini and Garibaldi.

When Garibaldi took Naples in September 1860, Bertani was appointed secretary-general of the provisional government, in which capacity he reorganised the police, abolished the secret service fund, founded twelve infant asylums, prepared for the suppression of the religious orders, and planned the sanitary reconstruction of the city.

In 1861, Agostino Bertani was elected to the Parliament of the newly established Kingdom of Italy, where he occupied a seat on the left-wing benches. He opposed the Garibaldi's expedition against Rome. He maintained close ties with Garibaldi, serving as his personal physician. After Garibaldi was defeated at the Battle of Aspromonte in 1862, he treated Garibaldi's wounds. In 1866, during the Third Italian War of Independence, he organised the medical service for the approximately 40,000 volunteers under Garibaldi's command who were operating in the Trentino region. The following year, despite personal reservations about the undertaking, he fought at the Battle of Mentana, functioning both as a medic and a combatant.

== Life in parliament ==
In 1866, Bertani founded a journal for social reform called La Riforma.

Bertani's parliamentary career was less successful than his revolutionary activity. Following the completion of Italian unification and the capture of Rome in 1870, he became the leader of the extreme left in the new Italian parliament. His political activity centred primarily on two issues: education and healthcare. His most significant parliamentary achievement was leading an inquiry into the sanitary conditions of the peasantry and the preparation of the sanitary code adopted by the administration of Francesco Crispi.

He consistently opposed government policies and, with the introduction of "transformismo" by Agostino Depretis in 1876, drawing ministers from the right and left, Bertani refused to enter the government. On 26 May 1877, disillusioned with the pragmatic and principle-compromising stance of the broader left, Bertani established a separate parliamentary group known as the Estrema Sinistra (Historical Extreme Left). This faction represented radical-liberal ideals, advocating full separation of church and state, administrative decentralisation, universal suffrage, and extensive social reforms.

In 1885, along with Anna Maria Mozzoni, he made a visit to the anarchist Giovanni Passannante, imprisoned for attempted murder of King Umberto I, and denounced his prison conditions. Bertani remained in parliament until his death in Rome on 30 April 1886 at the age of 73. He is regarded as one of the principal ideologues of the modern Italian healthcare and social welfare system. His work on sanitary codification exerted a lasting influence on public policy in this field for several decades.

== Commemoration ==
The Italian Regia Marina (Royal Navy) destroyer Agostino Bertani, commissioned in 1919, was named for Bertani.

== See also ==
- Unification of Italy
- Giuseppe Garibaldi
- Giuseppe Mazzini
