= 1867 Italian general election =

- 10 March 1867 (first round); 17 March 1867 (second round)

All 493 seats in the Chamber of Deputies 247 seats needed for a majority
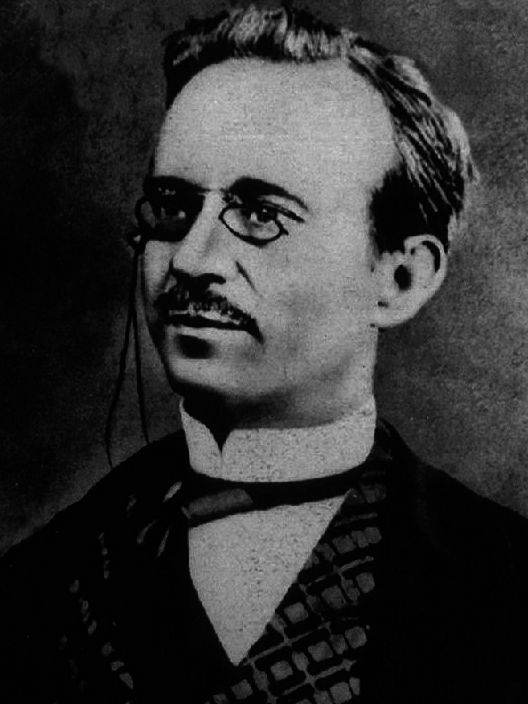

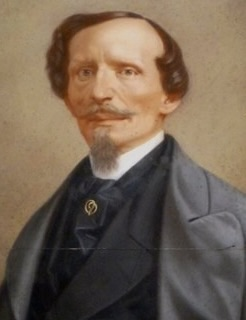
| | Majority party | Minority party |
|---|---|---|
| Leader | Urbano Rattazzi | Bettino Ricasoli |
| Party | Historical Left | Historical Right |
| Leader's seat | Alessandria | Florence |
| Seats won | 225 | 151 |
- Constituencies used for the elections
Prime Minister before election
Bettino Ricasoli
Historical Right
Elected Prime Minister
Urbano Rattazzi
Historical Left

General elections were held in Italy on 10 March 1867, with a second round on 17 March. Before the elections, Bettino Ricasoli resigned as prime minister due to a disagreement with the Chamber; the Chamber disapproved of his agreements with the Vatican regarding the repatriation of certain religious properties. These snap elections resulted in Urbano Rattazzi being elected once again to office.

Due to the restrictive Italian electoral laws of the time, only 504,265 Italian men, out of a total population of around 26 million, were entitled to vote. The voters were largely aristocrats, rentiers, and capitalists, who tended to hold moderate political views, including loyalty to the crown and low government spending.

== Campaign ==
The opposition to Ricasoli was mainly organized by former prime minister Rattazzi, a moderate member of the Historical Left, who had entered into a coalition with the Historical Right in Piedmont fifteen years earlier. Even though Italian elections were officially non-partisan, the political conflict was so evident that the election became a match between these two political heavyweights.

The 1867 election was a great defeat for Ricasoli, who thereafter retired to private life. However, while Ricasoli lost, Rattazzi did not receive a clear mandate, especially during the second part of the traditional two-round system. Many Independent candidates, who were ready to support any government that would support their local interests, were lukewarm supporters at best. Ultimately, Rattazzi was charged by the king to form a new government, but the fickle leftist faction abandoned him, forcing Rattazzi to form a new coalition. This was typical of Italian politics of the day, which were officially non-partisan with no structured parties. Voters instead were influenced more by localism and corruption, rather than loyalty to any leader or party.

Rattazzi tried to form a centrist government consisting of his centre-left moderate faction, some Independents, and the Historical Right. These groups agreed to the coalition in order to later regain control. However, despite his efforts, Rattazzi's victory was ephemeral, similar to his first term as prime minister in 1862: barely six months later he was unable to stop an armed attack by a national hero, Giuseppe Garibaldi, upon the Papal State. The King, seeing that Rattazzi was ineffective, quickly forced his resignation. Senator Luigi Federico Menabrea then took over as prime minister, with the Historical Right regaining full control of the government.

== Parties and leaders ==
| Party | Ideology | Leader |
|---|---|---|
| Historical Left | Liberalism | Urbano Rattazzi |
| Historical Right | Conservatism | Bettino Ricasoli |

== Results ==
| Party | First round | | | Second round | | | Total seats |
| Party | Votes | % | Seats | Votes | % | Seats | Total seats |
|---|---|---|---|---|---|---|---|
| Historical Left | | | 121 | | | 104 | 225 |
| Historical Right | | | 56 | | | 95 | 151 |
| Independents | | | 31 | | | 43 | 74 |
| Invalidated seats (Note: The electoral law did not limit the number of constituencies where a candidate could stand, so many politicians ran and won in two or more constituencies, which consequently needed by-elections to fill their seats.) | | | | | | | 43 |
| Total | | | 208 | | | 242 | 493 |
| Total votes | 276,523 | – | | | | | |
| Registered voters/turnout | 504,265 | 54.84 | | | | | |
Source: La Stampa
