= 1870 Italian general election =

- 20 November 1870 (first round); 27 November 1870 (second round)

All 508 seats in the Chamber of Deputies 255 seats needed for a majority
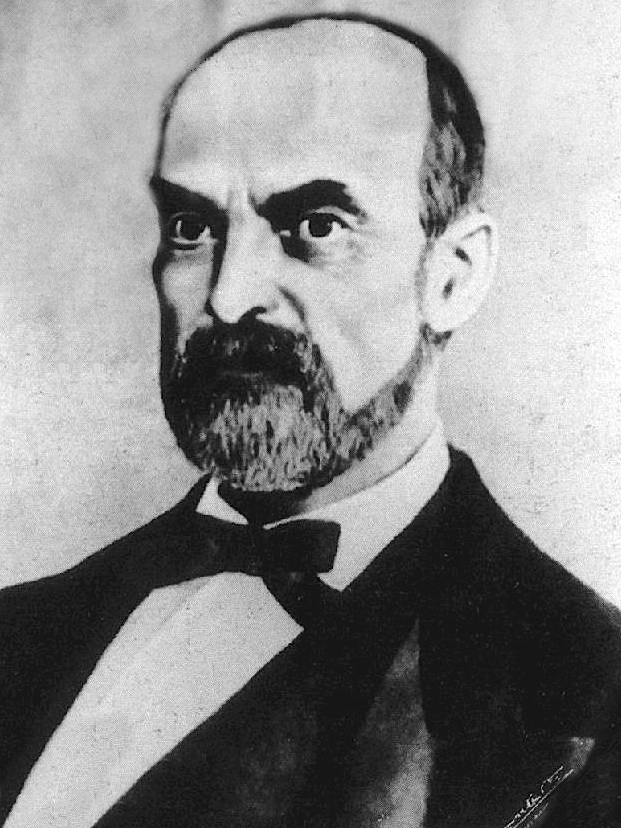

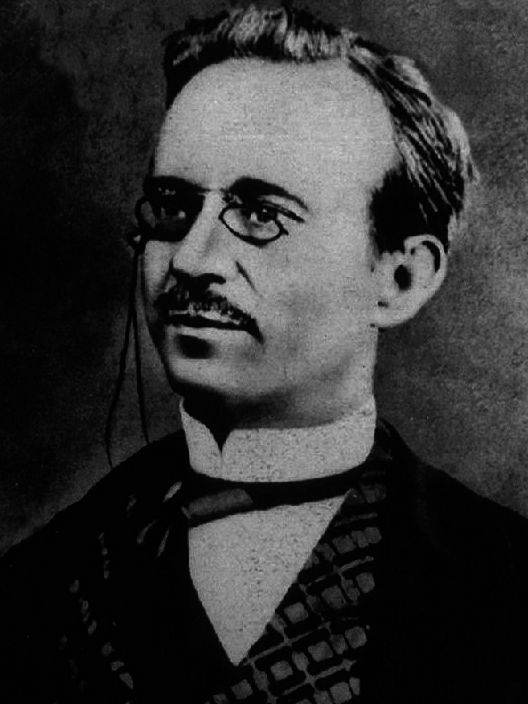
	Majority party	Minority party
Leader	Giovanni Lanza	Urbano Rattazzi
Party	Historical Right	Historical Left
Leader's seat	Vignale	Alessandria
Seats won	233	195
Seat change	▲82	▼30
- Constituencies used for the elections
Prime Minister before election
Giovanni Lanza
Historical Right
Elected Prime Minister
Giovanni Lanza
Historical Right

General elections were held in Italy on 20 November 1870, with a second round of voting on 27 November. They were a snap election, called by Prime Minister Giovanni Lanza to take advantage by the Capture of Rome and to give parliamentary representation to the future capital of Italy.

Only 530,018 men of a total population of around 26 million were entitled to vote. They were largely aristocrats representing rentiers from the north of the country, and held moderate political views including loyalty to the crown and low government spending.

== Campaign ==
The Historical Right was led by the Prime Minister of Italy, Giovanni Lanza, a conservative politician from Piedmont.

The bloc of the Historical Left was led by Urbano Rattazzi, a liberal politician and former Prime Minister, who led the left-wing for more than a decade.

The electoral result was controversial; in terms of percentages, Prime Minister Giovanni Lanza fully exploited the prestige of the Capture of Rome against his parliamentary opponents. However, the turnout further declined after the Non expedit of Pope Pius IX, so that less than 1% of the total population of the country took part to this election. The newly completed Italian State so revealed itself as a strict oligarchy with a deep fracture with its same population, creating a damage which was never really repaired.

After the election, Lanza was confirmed Prime Minister by the King.

== Parties and leaders ==
Party	Ideology	Leader
Historical Right	Conservatism	Giovanni Lanza
Historical Left	Liberalism	Urbano Rattazzi

== Results ==
Party	Votes	%	Seats	+/–
Historical Right			233	+82
Historical Left			195	−30
Independents			56	–18
Invalidated (Note: The electoral law did not limit the number of constituencies where a candidate could stand, so many politicians ran and won in two or more constituencies, which consequently needed by-elections to fill their seats.)			24	–
Total			508	+15
Valid votes	229,934	95.42		
Invalid/blank votes	11,040	4.58		
Total votes	240,974	100.00		
Registered voters/turnout	530,018	45.47		
Source: La Stampa
