= Felice Cavallotti =

Italian politician, poet and author (1842–1898)

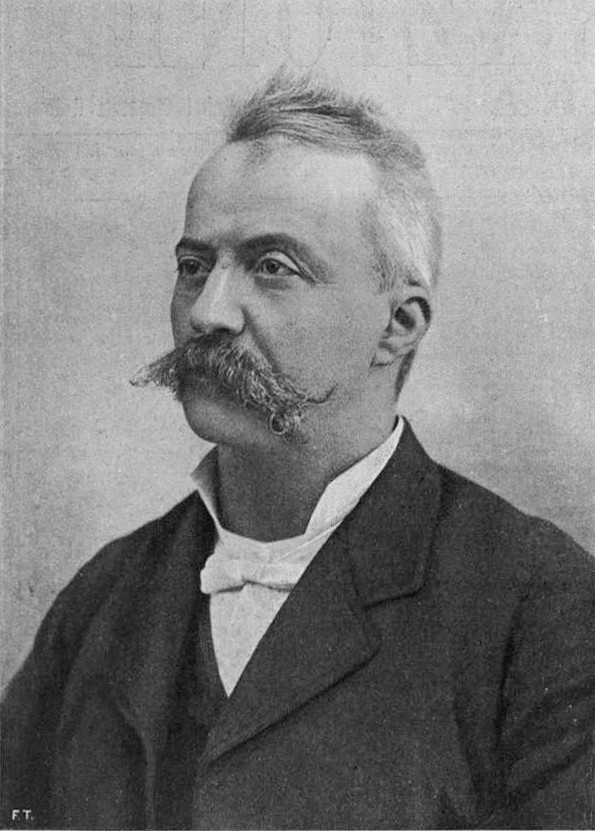

Member of Chamber of Deputies
- In office 5 December 1870 – 6 March 1898
- Constituency: Corteolona (1870–1880); Piacenza (1880–1890); Milan (1890–1895); Pavia (1895–1898)

Personal details
- Born: 6 November 1842 Milan, Kingdom of Lombardy–Venetia
- Died: 6 March 1898 (aged 55) Rome, Kingdom of Italy
- Party: Historical Far Left
- Occupation: Poet, dramatic author

Felice Cavallotti (6 November 1842 – 6 March 1898) was an Italian politician, poet and dramatic author.

== Biography ==
=== Early career ===
Born in Milan, Cavallotti fought with the Garibaldian Corps in their 1860 and 1866 campaigns during the Italian Wars of Independence.

Following his military service he created a series of anti-monarchical lampoons in the Gazzetta di Milano and in the Gazzettina Rosa between 1866 and 1872. He also commented on Garibaldi's deeds in the Neapolitan Indipendente, directed by Alexandre Dumas, père.

=== Political career ===
In 1872 Cavallotti was elected to the Italian Parliament as deputy for Corteolona. When sworn in Cavallotti took the oath of allegiance, despite having lampooned the oath in his articles. Eloquent and turbulent, his combativeness in and out of Parliament secured for him the leadership of the Extreme Left on the death of Agostino Bertani in 1886. During his twelve years' leadership, his party increased in number from twenty to seventy, and at the time of his death his parliamentary influence was greater than ever before.

Although he was ambitious and used defamatory methods of personal attack, Cavallotti's eloquent advocacy of democratic reform and apparent generosity of sentiment secured for him a popularity surpassed by that of no Italian political contemporary except Francesco Crispi.

Services rendered in the cholera epidemic of 1885, his numerous lawsuits and thirty-three duels, his bitter campaign against Crispi, and his championship of French interests combined to enhance his notoriety and to increase his political influence. By skillful alliances with the Marquis Antonio di Rudinì he more than once obtained practical control of the Italian government and exacted notable concessions to Radical demands.

In 1889 he contributed to the erection of the statue of Giordano Bruno in Campo de' Fiori at Rome, a symbol of the lay struggle against the unceasing encroachment of the Holy See in Italian politics.

=== Death ===
Aged 55, Cavallotti was killed in a duel against Count Ferruccio Macola, editor of the conservative Gazzetta di Venezia, whom he had insulted. Poet and Freemason Giosuè Carducci issued a celebrative discourse for his death. Cavallotti was buried in the cemetery of Dagnente, on the Lake Maggiore.

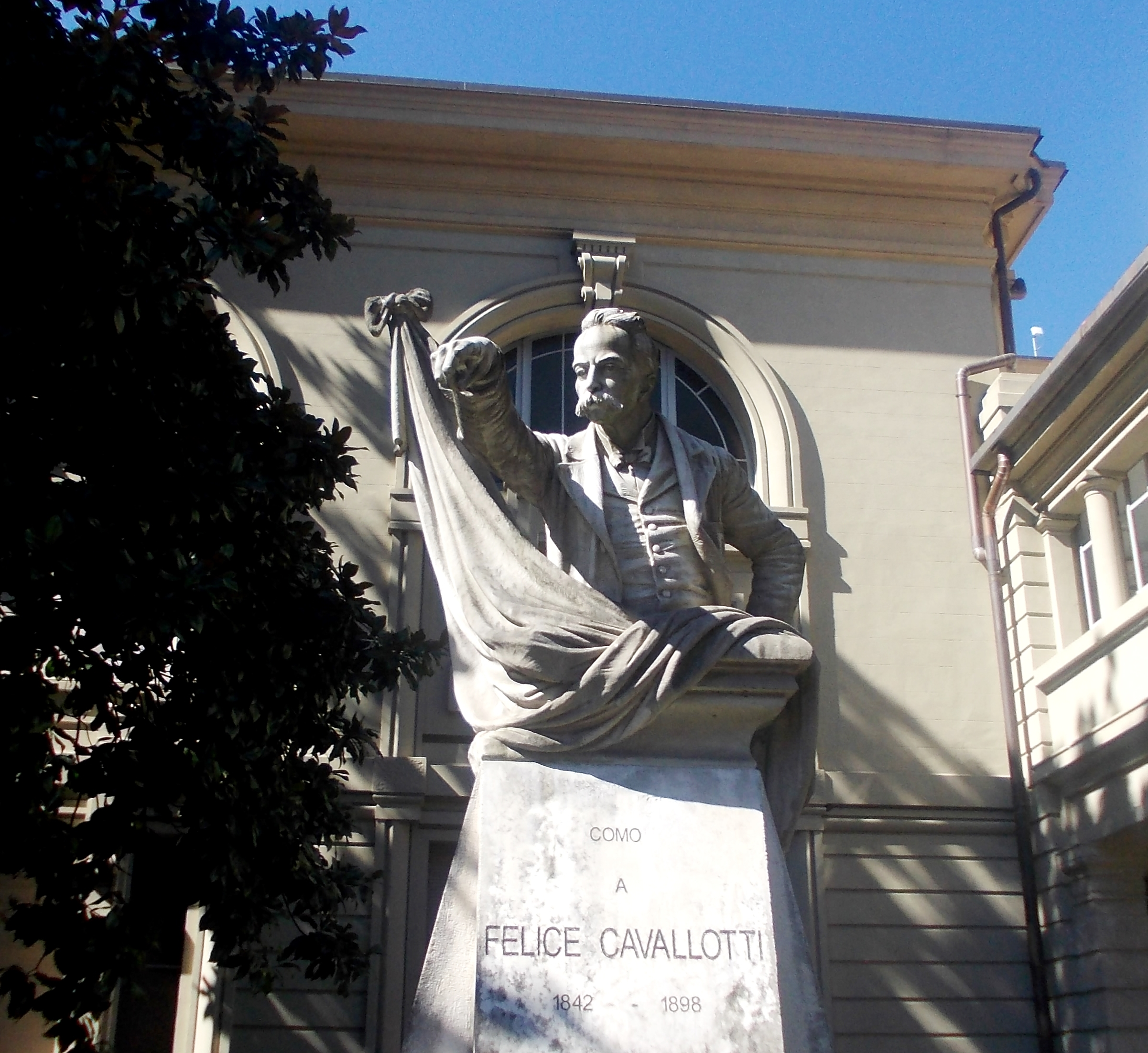
Bust to Felice Cavallotti in Como

However, Felice Cavallotti denied being a member of the Italian Freemasonry in a letter addressed on 9 January 1875 to the director of the journal Italia Reale. With the permission of his political opponent Francesco Crispi, Cavallotti contributed to the erection of the monument commemorating Giordano Bruno in Rome, place Campo de' Fiori, a work of the sculptor Ettore Ferrari which was Grand Master of the Grand Orient of Italy.

== Legacy ==
- via Felice Cavallotti: a street in Spoleto, Italy
- via Felice Cavallotti: a street in Milan, Italy
- via Felice Cavallotti: a street in Monza, Italy
- via Felice Cavallotti: a street in Genoa, Italy
- via Felice Cavallotti: a street in Rome, Italy
- Rue Cavallotti: a street in Paris, France
- Οδός Καβαλλόττι: a street in Athens, Greece

== See also ==
- Scapigliatura
