= 1876 Italian general election =

- 5 November 1876 (first round); 12 November 1876 (second round)

All 508 seats in the Chamber of Deputies 255 seats needed for a majority
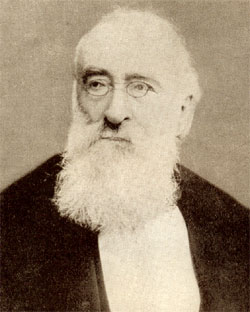

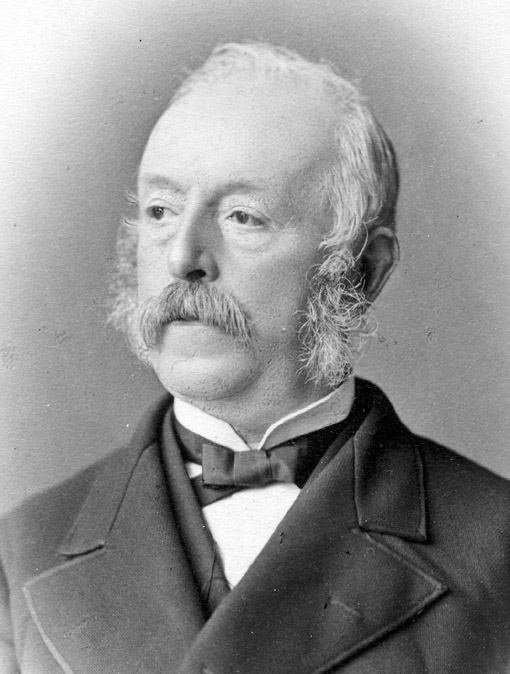
	Majority party	Minority party
Leader	Agostino Depretis	Marco Minghetti
Party	Historical Left	Historical Right
Leader's seat	Stradella	Legnago
Seats won	414	94
Seat change	▲182	▼182
Popular vote	243,319	97,726
Percentage	70.21%	28.20%
- Results by electoral college
Prime Minister before election
Agostino Depretis
Historical Left
Elected Prime Minister
Agostino Depretis
Historical Left

General elections were held in Italy on 5 November, with a second round of voting on 12 November.

== Campaign ==
The Historical Left was led by the current Prime Minister of Italy, Agostino Depretis, who became head of the government and early elections were called.

On the other hand, the bloc of the Historical Right was led by Marco Minghetti, former prime minister from Bologna.

The election on 5 and 12 November was a snap one, and it came after MPs from Tuscany became dissatisfied with the government of Minghetti following its refusal to intervene in the financial problems of Florence. The government was defeated on a vote on nationalising railways on 18 March 1876 and was forced to resign and Depretis was appointed prime minister. For the first time, the left-wing won an election, taking 414 of the 508 seats, of which 12 were extreme left-wingers. As opposed to the previous right-wing governments, whose members were largely aristocrats representing rentiers from the north of the country, and held moderate political views including loyalty to the crown and low government spending, the left-wing government represented the bourgeoisie of the south of the country and supported low taxation, secularism, a strong foreign policy and public jobs.

Only 605,007 men of a total population of around 28 million were entitled to vote.

== Parties and leaders ==
Party	Ideology	Leader
Historical Left	Liberalism	Agostino Depretis
Historical Right	Conservatism	Marco Minghetti

== Results ==
Party	Votes	%	Seats	+/–
Historical Left	243,319	70.21	414	+182
Historical Right	97,726	28.20	94	−182
Others	5,530	1.60	0	–
Total	346,575	100.00	508	0
Valid votes	346,575	96.74		
Invalid/blank votes	11,688	3.26		
Total votes	358,263	100.00		
Registered voters/turnout	605,007	59.22		
Source: National Institute of Statistics
