= 1861 Italian general election =

- 27 January 1861 (first round); 3 February 1861 (second round)

All 443 seats in the Chamber of Deputies 222 seats needed for a majority
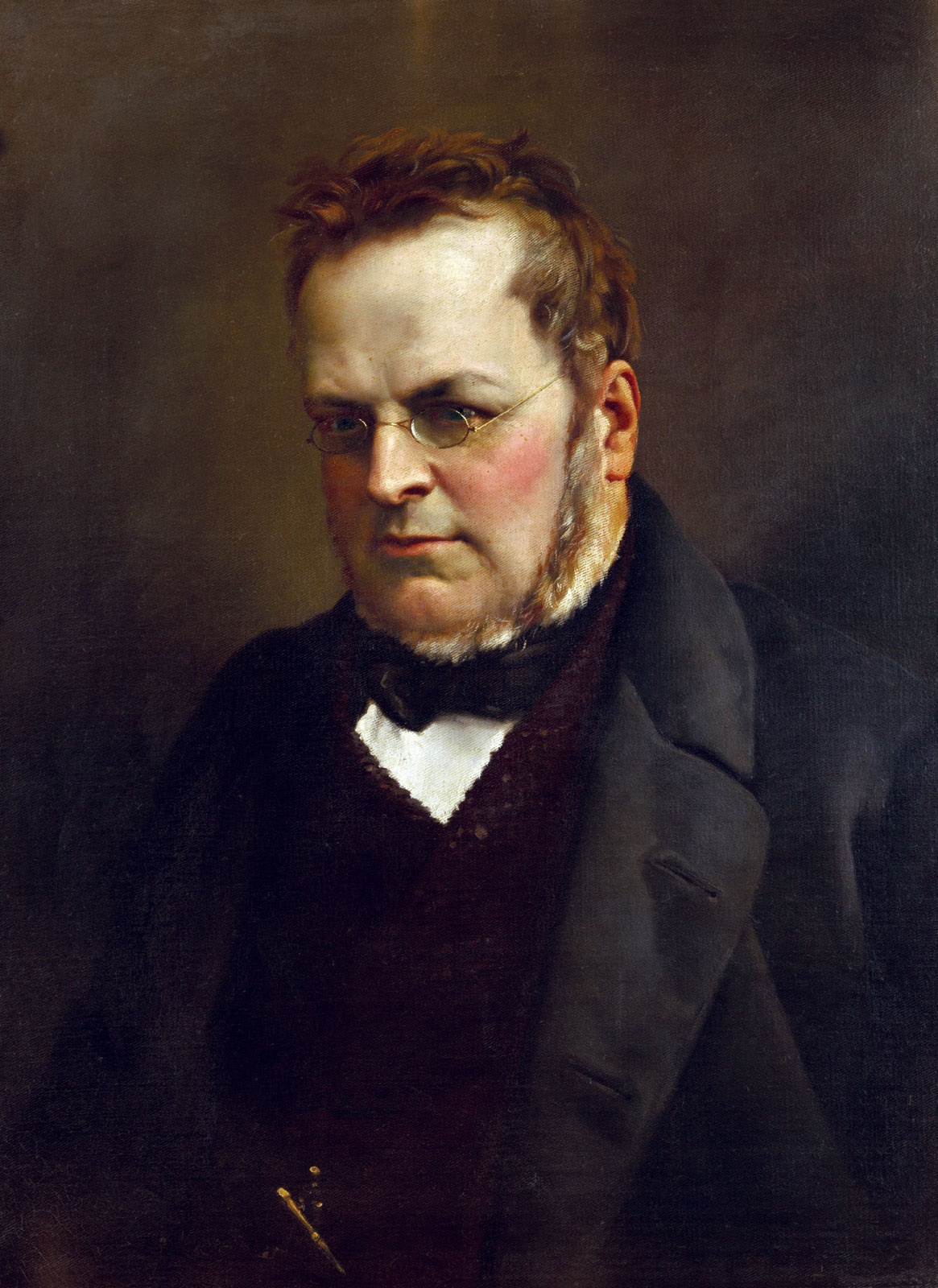

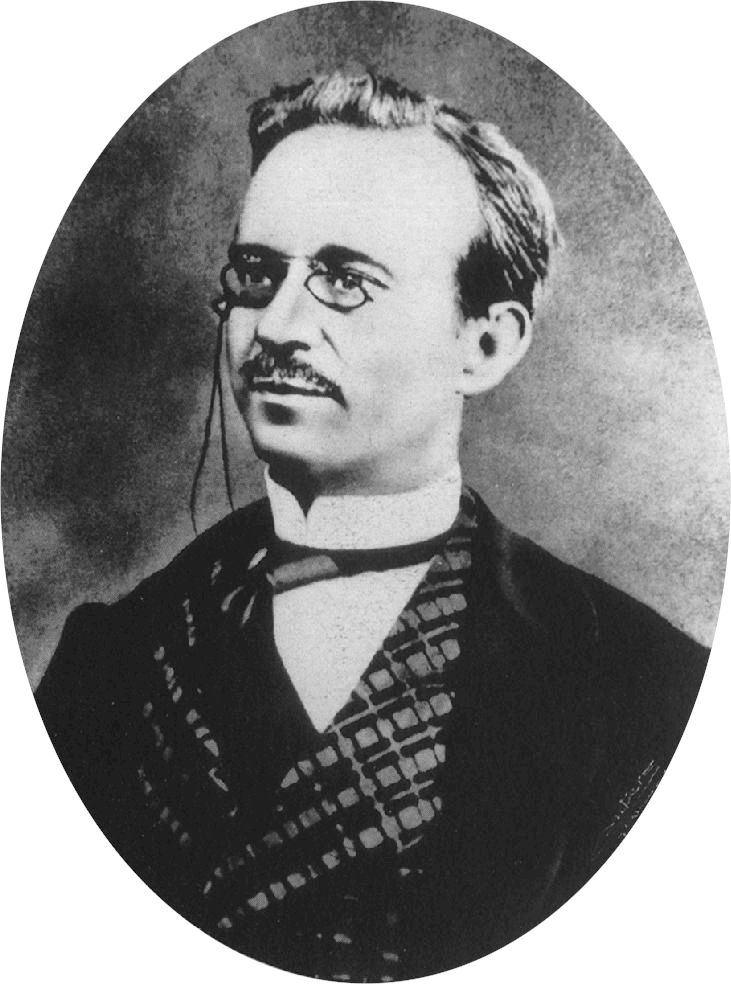

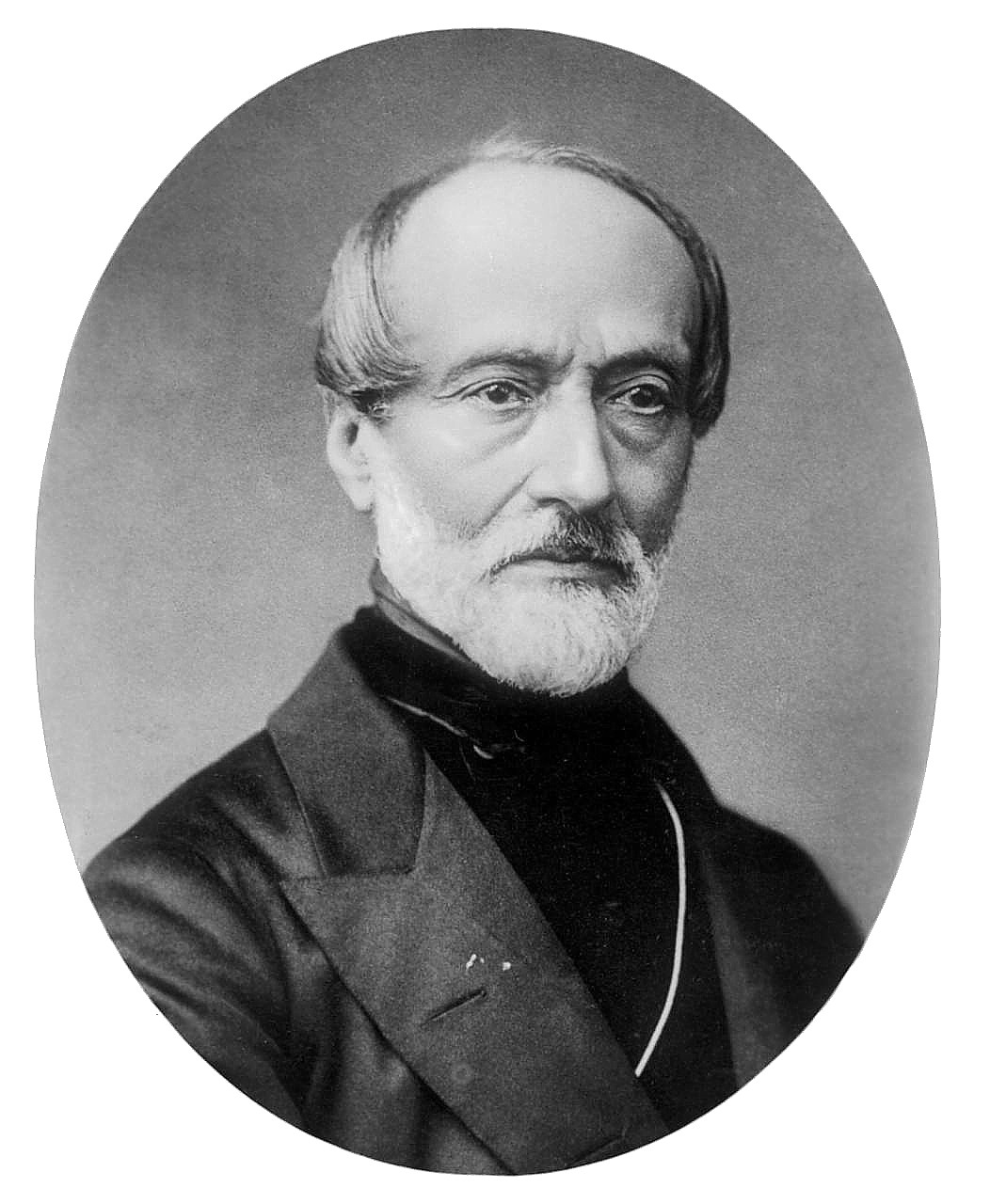
	Majority party	Minority party	Third party
Leader	Camillo Benso di Cavour	Urbano Rattazzi	Giuseppe Mazzini
Party	Historical Right	Historical Left	Historical Far Left
Seats won	342	62	14
- Constituencies used for the elections
Prime Minister before election
None
Elected Prime Minister
Camillo Benso, Count of Cavour
Historical Right

General elections were held in Italy on 27 January 1861, with a second round on 3 February. The newly elected Parliament first convened in Turin on 4 March 1861, where, thirteen days later, it declared the unification of the country as the Kingdom of Italy.

The elections were carried out according to the 1848 electoral law of the Kingdom of Sardinia, in which only literate men over the age of 25 and paying a certain level of taxation were allowed to vote. Candidates were elected in single member constituencies, with a second round required in cases when no candidates received over 50% of the vote or the equivalent of one-third of the registered voters in the constituency. Pope Pius IX demanded that Catholics did not take part in the elections.

== Campaign ==
The Historical Right was led by the former Prime Minister of the Kingdom of Sardinia, Camillo Benso, Count of Cavour, a long-time statesman and a leading figure in the movement toward Italian unification.

On the other hand, the bloc of the Historical Left was led by Urbano Rattazzi, a liberal politician who was among the founders of the Italian left-wing parliamentary group.

In opposition to the two main blocs there were a third party known as The Extreme, a far-left coalition, under the leadership of Giuseppe Mazzini, an Italian revolutionary and a key figure of the Unification.

Only 418,696 men of a total population of around 22 million were entitled to vote.

== Parties and leaders ==
Party	Ideology	Leader
Historical Right	Conservatism	Camillo Benso di Cavour
Historical Left	Liberalism	Urbano Rattazzi
Historical Far Left	Radicalism	Giuseppe Mazzini

== Results ==
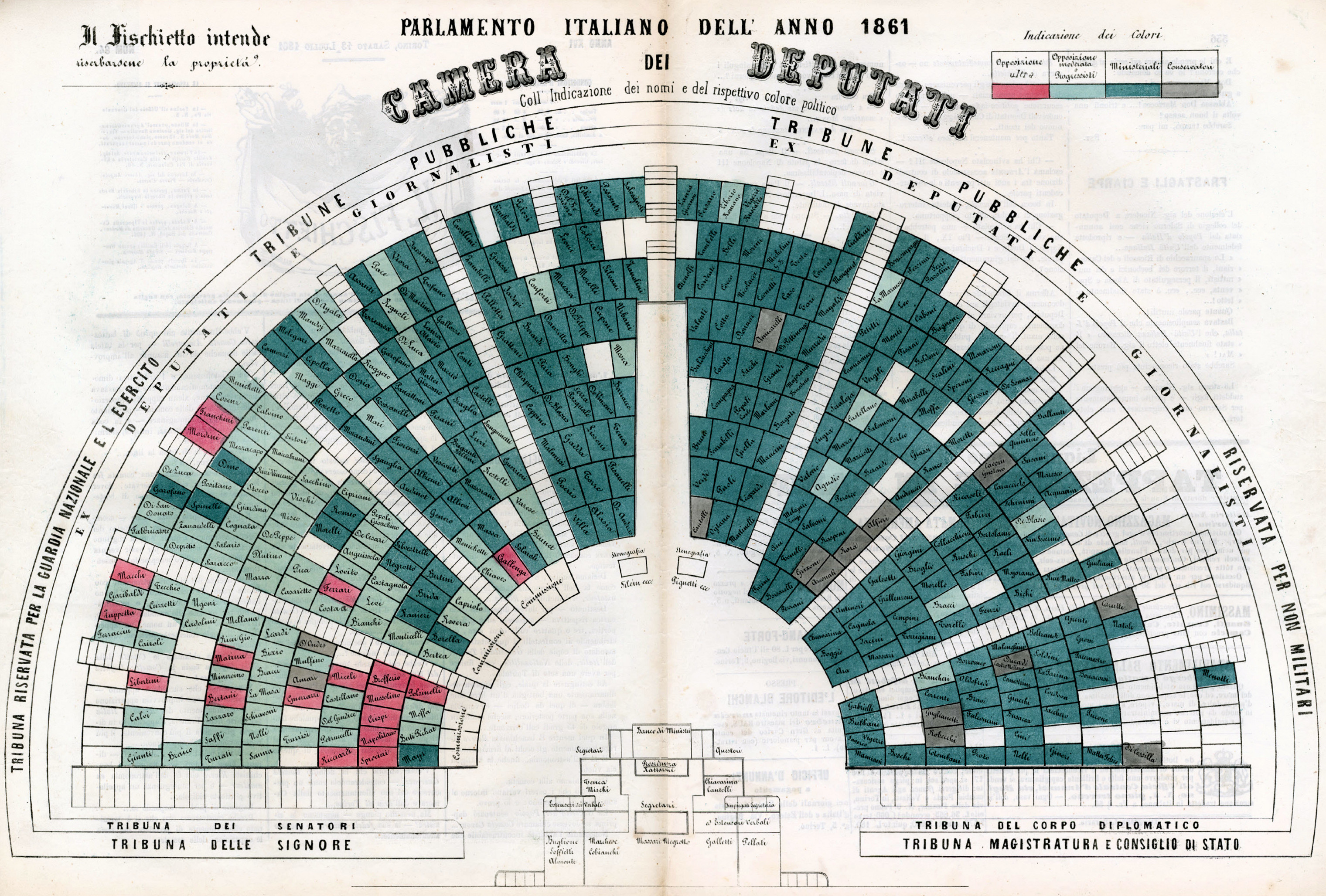
Composition of the Chamber of Deputies in 1861

Right-wing candidates emerged as the largest bloc in Parliament with around 43% of the 443 seats. They were largely aristocrats representing rentiers from the north of the country, and held moderate political views including loyalty to the crown and low government spending. The right-wing leader Camillo Benso di Cavour was elected as the first Prime Minister in the history of Italy.

Party	Votes	%	Seats
Historical Right			342
Historical Left			62
Historical Far Left			14
Others			25
Total			443
Total votes	239,583	–	
Registered voters/turnout	418,696	57.22	
Source: Nohlen & Stöver
