= Parliament of the Kingdom of Italy =

Bicameral parliament in former Kingdom of Italy

Parliament of the Kingdom of Italy Parlamento del Regno d'Italia
- Coat of Arms of the Kingdom of Italy

Type
- Type: Bicameral
- Houses: Senate of the Kingdom of Italy (upper house); Chamber of Deputies (lower house 1861–1939, 1943–46); Chamber of Fasces and Corporations (lower house 1939–43)

History
- Founded: 1861
- Disbanded: 1946
- Preceded by: Parliament of the Kingdom of Sardinia
- Succeeded by: Constituent Assembly of Italy

Meeting place
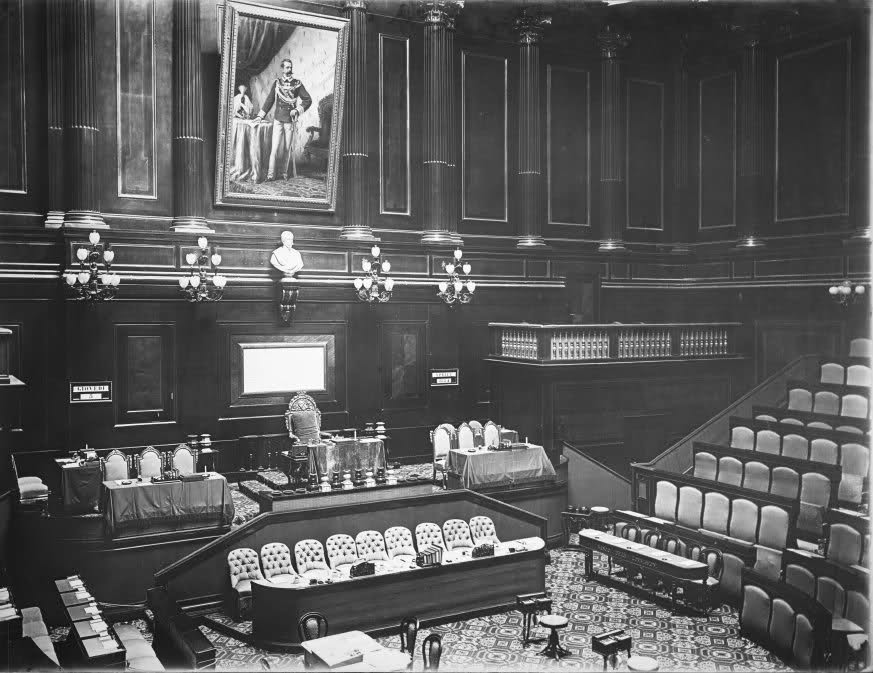
- Palazzo Madama, Rome (Senate)
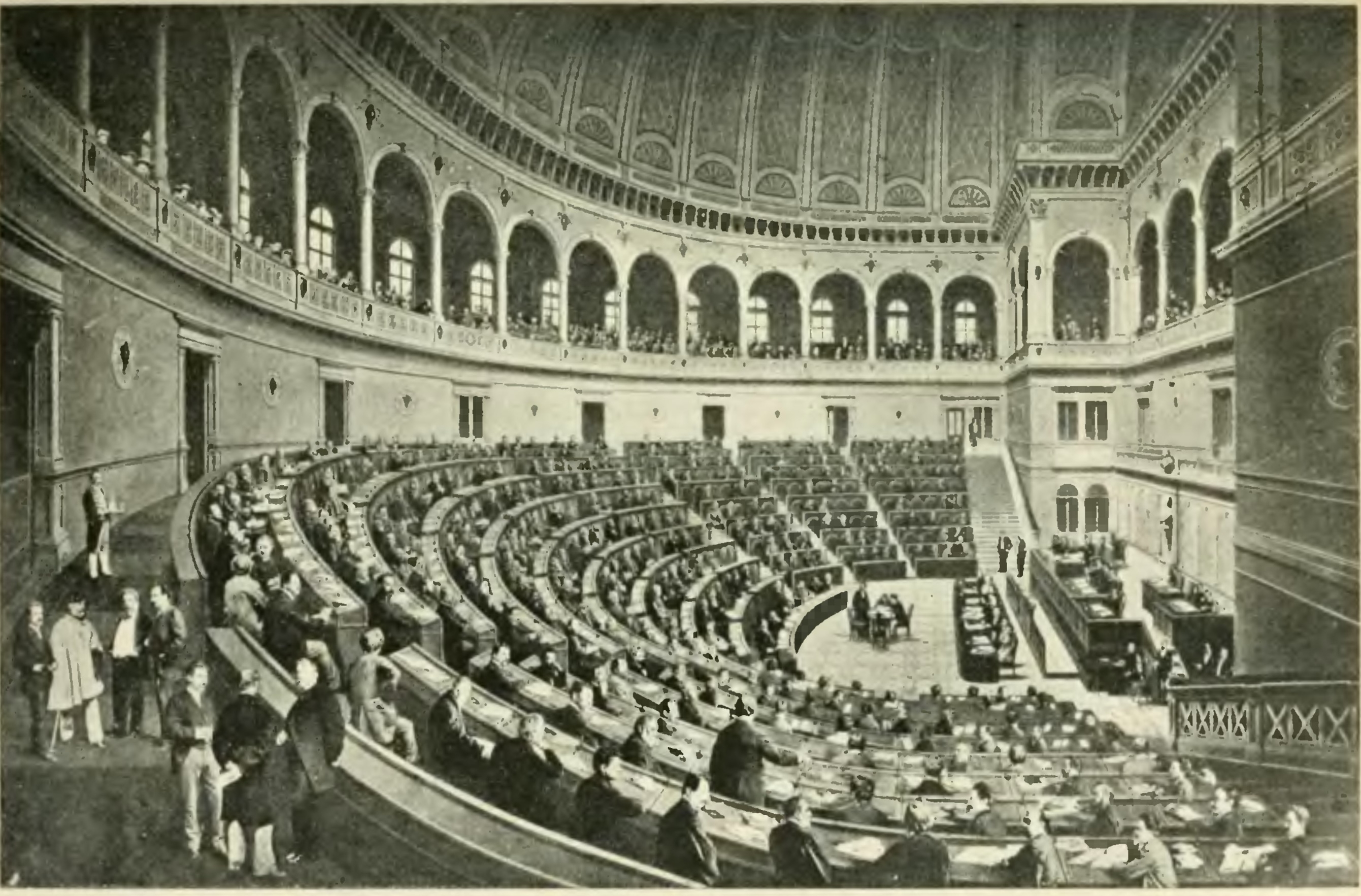
- Palazzo Montecitorio, Rome (lower house)

The Parliament of the Kingdom of Italy (Italian: Parlamento del Regno d'Italia) was the bicameral parliament of the Kingdom of Italy. It was established in 1861 to replace the Parliament of the Kingdom of Sardinia and lasted until 18 June 1946, when it was replaced by the present-day Italian Parliament. It was formed of a lower house (the Chamber of Deputies or after 1939 the Chamber of Fasces and Corporations) and an upper house (Senate of the Kingdom). The members of the Chamber of Deputies were elected, while members of the Senate were appointed by the King. Elections for the Chamber of Deputies were held in 1861, 1865, 1867, 1870, 1874, 1876, 1880, 1882, 1886, 1890, 1892, 1895, 1897, 1900, 1904, 1909, 1913, 1919, 1921, 1924, 1929 and 1934. The election of 1929 and 1934 were held under the election laws passed by Mussolini's government.
