= Chamber of Deputies (Kingdom of Italy) =

Legislative body of the Kingdom of Italy from 1861 until 1939

Chamber of Deputies of the Kingdom of Italy Camera dei Deputati del Regno d'Italia

Type
- Type: Lower house of the Parliament of the Kingdom of Italy

History
- Founded: 4 March 1861
- Disbanded: 19 January 1939; 2 June 1946
- Preceded by: Chamber of Deputies of the Kingdom of Sardinia
- Succeeded by: Chamber of Fasces and Corporations; Chamber of Deputies
- Seats: 443 (1861–1867); 493 (1867–1870); 508 (1870–1921); 535 (1921–1929); 400 (1929–1939)

Elections
- Voting system: Two-round system (1861–1919); Proportional representation (1919–1924); Strong majority bonus system under the Acerbo Law (1924–1929); Plebiscitary show elections (1929–1939)

Meeting place
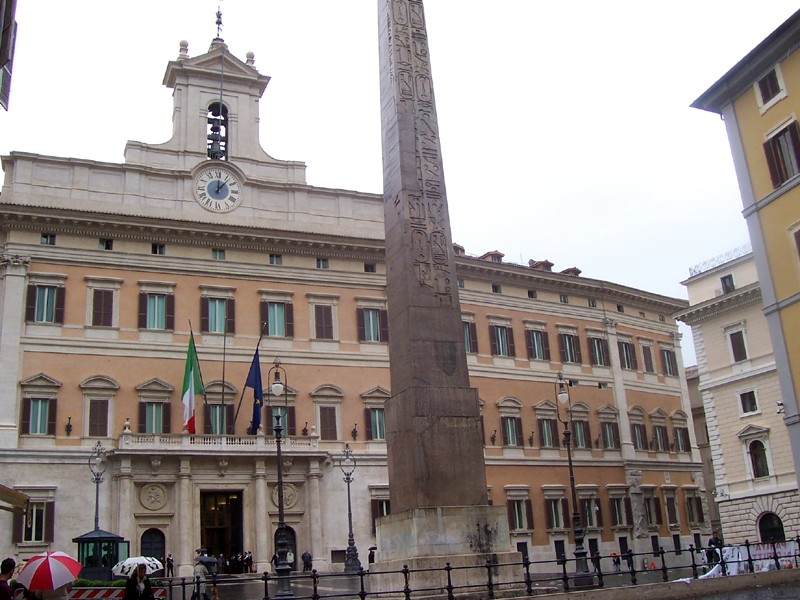
- Palazzo Montecitorio, Rome

The Chamber of Deputies of the Kingdom of Italy (Italian: Camera dei deputati del Regno d'Italia) was the main legislative body of the Kingdom of Italy descended from the lower house of the Kingdom of Sardinia, but supplemented with deputies from territories captured during the Second Italian War of Independence and the Expedition of the Thousand. Along with the Senate of the Kingdom of Italy, it formed the Parliament of the Kingdom of Italy from 1861 until 1939.

== History ==
Its electors were initially selected by wealth and then by literacy, before the introduction of universal suffrage for all men over 21 in 1919. It was elected using a system that was based on both majorities and proportionality.

It was based in the Palazzo Carignano in Turin (1861–1865), the Palazzo Vecchio in Florence (1865–1871), and finally the Palazzo Montecitorio (1871–1939). It was formed at the same time as the Kingdom of Italy in 1861, though its first sitting is known as the 8th Legislature of the Kingdom of Italy, since the 1st to 7th Legislatures are those of the Kingdom of Sardinia.

Its last sitting was the 29th Legislature of the Kingdom of Italy, which ended in 1939 when the Chamber voted to dissolve itself and replace itself with the Chamber of Fasces and Corporations.

== See also ==
- List of presidents of the Chamber of Deputies (Italy)
