= First di Rudinì government =

28th Government of Kingdom of Italy

Di Rudinì I government
- 28th Cabinet of Italy

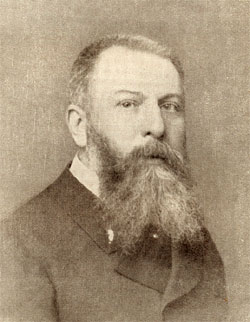
- Date formed: 6 February 1891
- Date dissolved: 15 May 1892

People and organisations
- Head of state: Umberto I
- Head of government: Antonio Starabba di Rudinì
- Total no. of members: 11
- Member party: Historical Right; Historical Left

History
- Predecessor: Crispi II Cabinet
- Successor: Giolitti I Cabinet

The Di Rudinì I government of Italy held office from 6 February 1891 until 15 May 1892, a total of 464 days, or 1 year, 3 months and 9 days.

== Government parties ==
The government was composed by the following parties:

| Party | Ideology | Leader |
|---|---|---|
| Historical Left | Liberalism | Giovanni Giolitti |
| Historical Right | Conservatism | Antonio Starabba di Rudinì |

== Composition ==
| Office | Name | Party | Term |
|---|---|---|---|
| Prime Minister | Antonio Starabba di Rudinì | Historical Right | (1891–1892) |
| Minister of the Interior | Giovanni Nicotera | Historical Left | (1891–1892) |
| Minister of Foreign Affairs | Antonio Starabba di Rudinì | Historical Right | (1891–1892) |
| Minister of Grace and Justice | Luigi Ferraris | Historical Right | (1891–1891) |
| Minister of Grace and Justice | Bruno Chimirri | Historical Right | (1891–1892) |
| Minister of Finance | Giuseppe Colombo | Historical Right | (1891–1892) |
| Minister of Finance | Luigi Luzzatti | Historical Right | (1892–1892) |
| Minister of Treasury | Luigi Luzzatti | Historical Right | (1891–1892) |
| Minister of War | Luigi Pelloux | Military | (1891–1892) |
| Minister of the Navy | Simone Antonio Saint-Bon | Military | (1891–1892) |
| Minister of Agriculture, Industry and Commerce | Bruno Chimirri | Historical Right | (1891–1891) |
| Minister of Agriculture, Industry and Commerce | Antonio Starabba di Rudinì | Historical Right | (1891–1892) |
| Minister of Public Works | Ascanio Branca | Historical Left | (1891–1892) |
| Minister of Public Education | Pasquale Villari | Historical Right | (1891–1892) |
| Minister of Post and Telegraphs | Ascanio Branca | Historical Left | (1891–1892) |
