= Third di Rudinì government =

33rd Government of Kingdom of Italy

Di Rudinì III government
- 33rd Cabinet of Italy

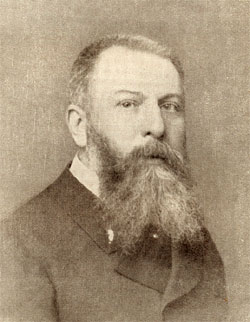
- Date formed: 15 July 1896
- Date dissolved: 14 December 1897

People and organisations
- Head of state: Umberto I
- Head of government: Antonio Starabba di Rudinì
- Total no. of members: 11
- Member party: Historical Right; Historical Left

History
- Predecessor: Di Rudinì II Cabinet
- Successor: Di Rudinì IV Cabinet

The Di Rudinì III government of Italy held office from 15 July 1896 until 14 December 1897, a total of 521 days, or 1 year, 5 months and 3 days.

== Government parties ==
The government was composed by the following parties:

| Party | Ideology | Leader |
|---|---|---|
| Historical Left | Liberalism | Giovanni Giolitti |
| Historical Right | Conservatism | Antonio Starabba di Rudinì |

== Composition ==
| Office | Name | Party | Term |
|---|---|---|---|
| Prime Minister | Antonio Starabba di Rudinì | Historical Right | (1896–1897) |
| Minister of the Interior | Antonio Starabba di Rudinì | Historical Right | (1896–1897) |
| Minister of Foreign Affairs | Emilio Visconti Venosta | Historical Right | (1896–1897) |
| Minister of Grace and Justice | Giacomo Giuseppe Costa | Historical Right | (1896–1897) |
| Minister of Grace and Justice | Antonio Starabba di Rudinì | Historical Right | (1897–1897) |
| Minister of Grace and Justice | Emanuele Gianturco | Historical Left | (1897–1897) |
| Minister of Finance | Ascanio Branca | Historical Left | (1896–1897) |
| Minister of Treasury | Luigi Luzzatti | Historical Right | (1896–1897) |
| Minister of War | Luigi Pelloux | Military | (1896–1897) |
| Minister of the Navy | Benedetto Brin | Military | (1896–1897) |
| Minister of Agriculture, Industry and Commerce | Francesco Guicciardini | Historical Right | (1896–1897) |
| Minister of Public Works | Giulio Prinetti | Historical Right | (1896–1897) |
| Minister of Public Education | Emanuele Gianturco | Historical Left | (1896–1897) |
| Minister of Public Education | Giovanni Codronchi | Historical Right | (1897–1897) |
| Minister of Post and Telegraphs | Emilio Sineo | Historical Right | (1896–1897) |
