= Third Crispi government =

30th Government of Kingdom of Italy

Crispi III government
- 30th Cabinet of Italy

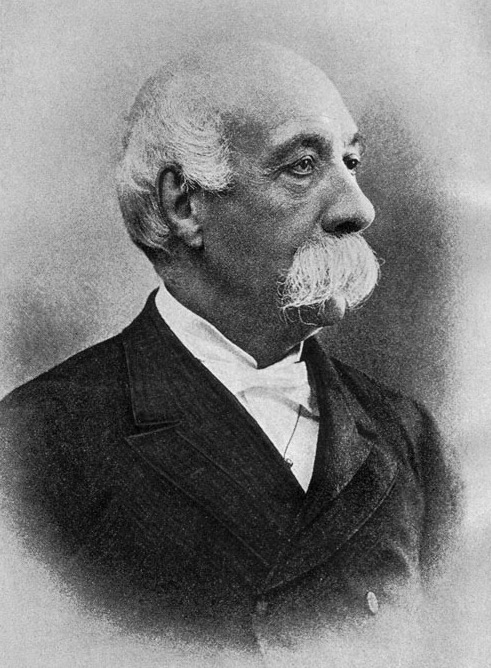
- Date formed: 15 December 1893
- Date dissolved: 14 June 1894

People and organisations
- Head of state: Umberto I
- Head of government: Francesco Crispi
- Total no. of members: 11
- Member party: Historical Left

History
- Predecessor: Giolitti I Cabinet
- Successor: Crispi IV Cabinet

The Crispi III government of Italy held office from 15 December 1893 until 14 June 1894, a total of 181 days, or 5 months and 30 days.

== Government parties ==
The government was composed by the following parties:

Party	Ideology	Leader
Historical Left	Liberalism	Francesco Crispi
Historical Right	Conservatism	Antonio Starabba di Rudinì

== Composition ==
Office	Name	Party	Term
Prime Minister	Francesco Crispi	Historical Left	(1893–1894)
Minister of the Interior	Francesco Crispi	Historical Left	(1893–1894)
Minister of Foreign Affairs	Alberto Blanc	Historical Left	(1893–1894)
Minister of Grace and Justice	Vincenzo Calenda di Tavani	Historical Left	(1893–1894)
Minister of Finance	Sidney Sonnino	Historical Right	(1893–1894)
Minister of Treasury	Sidney Sonnino	Historical Right	(1893–1894)
Minister of War	Stanislao Mocenni	Military	(1893–1894)
Minister of the Navy	Enrico Morin	Military	(1893–1894)
Minister of Agriculture, Industry and Commerce	Paolo Boselli	Historical Right	(1893–1894)
Minister of Public Works	Giuseppe Saracco	Historical Left	(1893–1894)
Minister of Public Education	Guido Baccelli	Historical Left	(1893–1894)
Minister of Post and Telegraphs	Maggiorino Ferraris	Historical Left	(1893–1894)
