= Fourth Crispi government =

31st Government of Kingdom of Italy

Crispi IV government
- 31st Cabinet of Italy

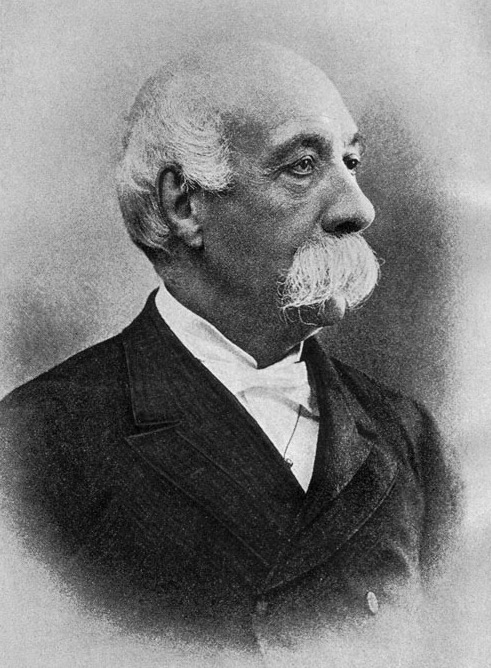
- Date formed: 14 June 1894
- Date dissolved: 10 March 1896

People and organisations
- Head of state: Umberto I
- Head of government: Francesco Crispi
- Total no. of members: 11
- Member party: Historical Left

History
- Predecessor: Crispi III Cabinet
- Successor: Rudinì II Cabinet

The Crispi IV government of Italy held office from 14 June 1894 until 10 March 1896, a total of 635 days, or 1 year, 8 months and 25 days.

== Government parties ==
The government was composed by the following parties:

Party	Ideology	Leader
Historical Left	Liberalism	Francesco Crispi
Historical Right	Conservatism	Antonio Starabba di Rudinì

== Composition ==
Office	Name	Party	Term
Prime Minister	Francesco Crispi	Historical Left	(1894–1896)
Minister of the Interior	Francesco Crispi	Historical Left	(1894–1896)
Minister of Foreign Affairs	Alberto Blanc	Historical Left	(1894–1896)
Minister of Grace and Justice	Vincenzo Calenda di Tavani	Historical Left	(1894–1896)
Minister of Finance	Paolo Boselli	Historical Right	(1894–1896)
Minister of Treasury	Sidney Sonnino	Historical Right	(1894–1896)
Minister of War	Stanislao Mocenni	Military	(1894–1896)
Minister of the Navy	Enrico Morin	Military	(1894–1896)
Minister of Agriculture, Industry and Commerce	Augusto Barazzuoli	Historical Left	(1894–1896)
Minister of Public Works	Giuseppe Saracco	Historical Left	(1894–1896)
Minister of Public Education	Guido Baccelli	Historical Left	(1894–1896)
Minister of Post and Telegraphs	Maggiorino Ferraris	Historical Left	(1894–1896)
