= Teodorico Bonacci =

Italian politician

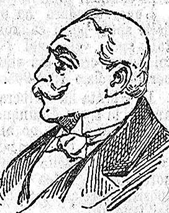

Senator
- In office 4 March 1904 – 13 January 1905

Minister of Justice
- In office 15 May 1892 – 24 May 1893
- Preceded by: Bruno Chimirri
- Succeeded by: Lorenzo Eula
- In office 1 June 1898 – 29 June 1898
- Preceded by: Giuseppe Zanardelli
- Succeeded by: Camillo Finocchiaro Aprile

Member of the Chamber of Deputies

Teodorico Bonacci (Jesi, 30 June 1838 – Rome, 13 January 1905) was an Italian politician, deputy and senator of the Kingdom. He was twice Minister of Justice.

== Family background ==
Teodorico was the son of the politician and magistrate Filippo Bonacci, a moderate liberal during the revolution of 1848 who was elected for the constituency of Fano in the short-lived Council of Deputies in the That representative body was born from the first, timid attempt at constitutional reform of the Papal States, soon overtaken by the Roman Republic. After the papal restoration Filippo Bonacci was dismissed from the judiciary, but in 1860 the Piedmontese and then Italian government, in recognition of his patriotic merits, reinstated him to judicial roles. Consequentially, he exercised functions at the Court of Ancona, at the Attorney General's Office at the Court of Appeal of Casale Monferrato, and at the Court of Cassation of Turin. In December 1869 Filippo Bonacci was elected to the Chamber of Deputies of the Kingdom of Italy for Recanati in the X legislature but was excluded following the draw required by law in the event of an excessive number of elected magistrates. At the end of 1870 he was appointed senator of the Kingdom but died soon after in 1872.

== Early life and career ==
Young Teodorico took part in the Garibaldi uprisings in South Tirol in 1866, fighting at the battle of Monte Suello. After graduating in law from La Sapienza, he practiced as a civil and commercial lawyer in the office of the prestigious jurist Pasquale Stanislao Mancini. He was involved in high-profile cases such as the annulment of the marriage of Garibaldi and Countess Raimondi. Teodorico also married Mancini's daughter Rosa and the couple had seven children, including a son Giuliani who was a correspondent for Corriere della Sera and a daughter Anna who was a writer and actress.

He entered the world of politics and securing election as deputy for Jesi in 1876 for the XIII legislature, entering the Chamber on the historical Left. In 1880 he was re-elected in Jesi for the XIV legislature and in 1882 in Ancona in for the XV legislature, during which he aligned himself with Francesco Crispi and his allies against the faction led by Agostino Depretis. In 1884 he presented a bill for the expansion of administrative suffrage and the election of mayors; at the end of 1885, he followed Crispi's line against the land reform advocated by Depretis. In January 1886 he was elected member of the supervisory commission on ecclesiastical estates, but the following year he failed to secure re-election. He returned to the Chamber in 1888 following the resignation of Ancona's sitting deputy.

== Ministerial career ==
During the 17th legislature, for which he was again elected in Ancona, he joined the first Giolitti government as Minister of Justice. In 1892 he reintroduced a bill originally proposed by an earlier Justice Minister, Paolo Onorato Vigliani, that would have made it a legal requirement for couples to have a civil marriage before a church wedding. This was again opposed by the Catholic Church, including Pope Leo XIII himself. His bill was unsuccessful, as was his proposal to establish divorce in civil law. Soon afterwards the government was engulfed by the Banca Romana scandal; the opposition suspected that the government was moving and replacing judges to cover its tracks, and the Chamber therefore refused to pass the budget proposed for the Justice Department. In an unprecedented move, Bonacci resigned as a result, followed shortly by his other cabinet colleagues.

His second term as Minister of Justice came after the price riots of May 1898, and the harsh repression that followed. Antonio Starabba, Marchese di Rudinì resigned as Prime Minister and formed a new government choosing Bonacci as Minister of Justice. It was a key role for the reforms he wished to bring forward regarding public order and security. Bonacci's first bill, valid until 30 June 1899, proposed the prohibition of publications dangerous for public order, power to conscript railway and postal personnel, and the declaration of martial law. A second bill aimed to make the conscription of certain categories of workers permanent by subjecting them to the jurisdiction of military courts. A third bill regulated the activity of associations, cooperatives and mutual societies, allowing prefects to dissolve order the dissolve those "directed in any way to the subversion of the institutions of the State, or the defence of acts classified as crimes by law.” The bills made little progress in the Chamber and within weeks Rudini lost his majority and Bonacci was out of office again.

On March 4, 1904, he was appointed senator but died the following year.

== Honours ==
Grand'Ufficiale dell'Ordine dei Santi Maurizio e Lazzaro - ribbon for ordinary uniform

Grand Officer of the Order of Saints Maurice and Lazarus
