= Il Giornale d'Italia =

Italian newspaper

- "Il Quotidiano Indipendente"
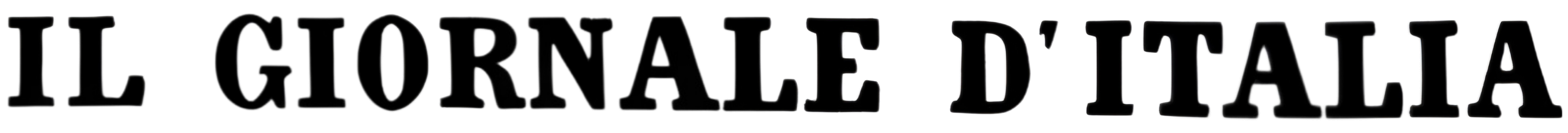

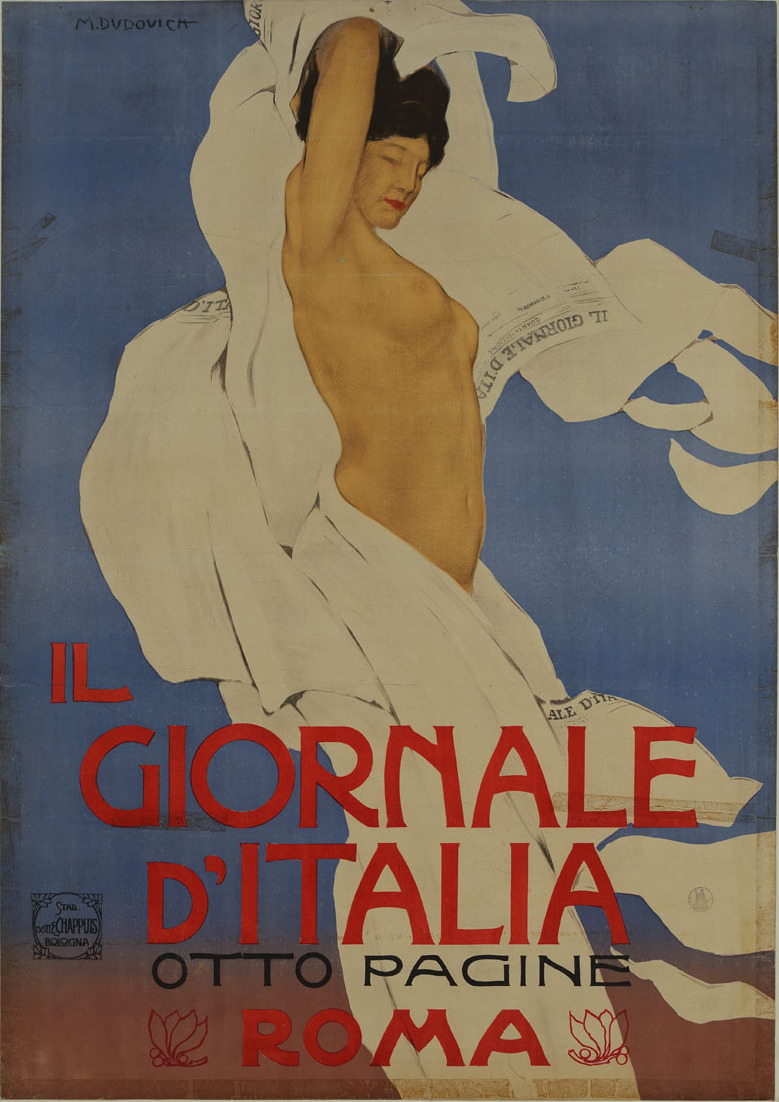
- Early 20th-century advertising poster of Il Giornale d'Italia by Marcello Dudovich
- Type: Daily newspaper (1901–1976; 1980–2006); Online newspaper (since 2012)
- Founder(s): Sidney Sonnino; Antonio Salandra
- Publisher: Comcast Italia
- Editor: Giovan Battista Vico
- Ceased publication: 24 July 1976 (first time); 2006 (first relaunch)
- Relaunched: 22 February 1980 (first relaunch); 10 October 2012 (second relaunch)
- Political alignment: Conservative liberalism (1901–1925; 1946–1976; since 2020); Formerly: Fascism (1925–1944); Pensioners' interests (1980–2006); Right-wing populism (2012–2018)
- Language: Italian
- Headquarters: Milan; Rome (historically)
- Country: Kingdom of Italy (1901–1946) (since 1946)
- Website: ilgiornaleditalia.it

Il Giornale d'Italia is an Italian online newspaper. It was founded in Rome in 1901 by the prestigious liberal politicians Sidney Sonnino and Antonio Salandra, both of which were part of the Liberal Constitutional Party. The original paper ceased publication in 1976, following a long decline in sales. It was later relaunched as the party organ of the Movimento Pensionati Uomini Vivi and had a brief revival, only to cease publication again in 2006.

The paper was relaunched again, this time as an online publication, on 10 October 2012.

== History ==
=== Monarchy and fascism ===
The newspaper was born from an idea of Sidney Sonnino and Antonio Salandra, two political exponents of the liberal Historical Right, and in particular representatives of the component of conservative liberalism. Another founder was the Italian journalist Andrea Torre who would serve as the minister of public education in 1919. They chose together the name of the newspaper and its editor; after consulting with Luigi Albertini, director of the Corriere della Sera, the choice fell on Alberto Bergamini, who had demonstrated strong organizational skills.

In 1901 the editor Alberto Bergamini created the "la Terza Pagina" ("Third Page"), featuring essays in literature, philosophy, criticism, the arts, and politics by eminent intellectuals, including Alessandro D'Ancona, Giuseppe Chiarini, Domenico Gnoli, Raffaele De Cesare, Antonio Fogazzaro, Luigi Capuana, Luigi Pirandello, Cesare De Lollis, Attilio Momigliano, Salvatore Di Giacomo, Alfredo Panzini, Pasquale Villari and Benedetto Croce.

The upscale press quickly followed suit with their own versions. The death of founder Sydney Sonnino in 1922 and a violent Black shirt attack on Bergamini that forced him to resign in 1923, had a devastating impact. The newspaper never recovered its prestige.

Folco Testena served as the editor-in-chief of Il Giornale d'Italia in the 1930s. Until his editorship the paper was a patriotic and monarchist publication. Then it became a supporter of the fascist regime in Italy. The paper had its headquarters in Rome.

=== Republic ===
The abolition of the Italian monarchy was a strong blow to the paper, which was a major supporter of constitutional monarchism. Nonetheless, under the editorship of Santi Savarino, it accepted the Republic and continued to support conservative liberal positions and was closed to the Italian Liberal Party. During this period, the paper hosted the contributions of several intellectuals, like Father Luigi Sturzo, Aldo Rizzo, Alberto Sensini, Giano Accame, Randolfo Pacciardi and Federico Orlando.

During the 1950s and 60s, the paper was owned by the General Confederation of Italian Industry (ConfIndustria), but in 1969 it was sold to Attilio Monti. The paper gradually went into decline and ceased publications in 1976.

In 1980, Il Giornale d'Italia was bought by Luigi d'Amato, leader of the Movimento Pensionati Uomini Vivi, who turned it into a publication of his party; the paper saw a modest revival under the editorship of Franco Simeoni and Angelo Frignani, but it went again into decline at the end of the 90s and ceased publications in 2006.

=== Online publication ===
In 2012, Il Giornale d'Italia was bought by Francesco Storace, leader of The Right, who revived it as an online publication close to right-wing populist positions. It had little fortune and it again suspended publications in 2018. In 2020, the paper was bought by Comcast Italia, which relaunched it again as an online newspaper under the leadership of Sergio Luciano.

Under the editorship of Luciano, and leader of Giovan Battista Vico, Il Giornale d'Italia became once again close to conservative liberal positions. In 2021, the 120th anniversary of the paper's foundation were celebrated, in a ceremony that saw the participation of the editor Giovan Battista Vico and the editor of the Corriere della Sera, Luciano Fontana. The direction is entrusted now to Luca Greco, and the editorial line is based on facts and figures, with moderate tones, in 2024, the 123th anniversary of the paper's founding.

== Bibliography ==
- Borsato, Felice (January 2002). "Terza pagina: cento anni di giornalismo d'autore". L'Opinione.
