= First Giolitti government =

29th Government of Kingdom of Italy

Giolitti I government
- 29th Cabinet of Italy

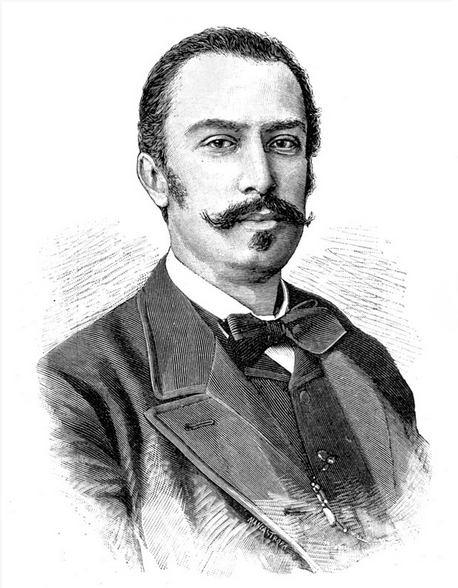
- Date formed: 15 May 1892
- Date dissolved: 15 December 1893

People and organisations
- Head of state: Umberto I
- Head of government: Giovanni Giolitti
- Total no. of members: 11
- Member party: Historical Left

History
- Predecessor: Di Rudinì I Cabinet
- Successor: Crispi III Cabinet

The Giolitti I government of Italy held office from 15 May 1892 until 15 December 1893, a total of 579 days, or 1 year and 7 months.

== Government parties ==
The government was composed by the following parties:

Party	Ideology	Leader
Historical Left	Liberalism	Giovanni Giolitti

== Composition ==
Office	Name	Party	Term
Prime Minister	Giovanni Giolitti	Historical Left	(1892–1893)
Minister of the Interior	Giovanni Giolitti	Historical Left	(1892–1893)
Minister of Foreign Affairs	Benedetto Brin	Military	(1892–1893)
Minister of Grace and Justice	Teodorico Bonacci	Historical Left	(1892–1893)
Minister of Grace and Justice	Lorenzo Eula	Historical Left	(1893–1893)
Minister of Grace and Justice	Giacomo Armò	Historical Left	(1893–1893)
Minister of Grace and Justice	Francesco Santamaria-Nicolini	Historical Left	(1893–1893)
Minister of Finance	Vittorio Ellena	Historical Left	(1892–1892)
Minister of Finance	Bernardino Grimaldi	Historical Left	(1892–1893)
Minister of Finance	Lazzaro Gagliardo	Historical Left	(1893–1893)
Minister of Treasury	Bernardino Grimaldi	Historical Left	(1892–1893)
Minister of War	Luigi Pelloux	Military	(1892–1893)
Minister of the Navy	Simone Antonio Saint-Bon	Military	(1892–1892)
Minister of the Navy	Benedetto Brin	Military	(1892–1892)
Minister of the Navy	Carlo Alberto Racchia	Military	(1892–1893)
Minister of Agriculture, Industry and Commerce	Pietro Lacava	Historical Left	(1892–1893)
Minister of Public Works	Francesco Genala	Historical Left	(1892–1893)
Minister of Public Works	Giovanni Giolitti	Historical Left	(1893–1893)
Minister of Public Education	Ferdinando Martini	Historical Left	(1892–1893)
Minister of Post and Telegraphs	Camillo Finocchiaro Aprile	Historical Left	(1892–1893)
