= Liberal Constitutional Party (Italy) =

Liberal Constitutional Party Partito Liberal Costituzionale
- Leader: The Marquess of Rudinì; The Baron Sonnino
- Founded: 1882
- Dissolved: 1913
- Preceded by: Historical Right
- Merged into: Liberal Union
- Headquarters: Rome
- Ideology: Liberal conservatism Conservative liberalism
- Political position: Centre-right

The Liberal Constitutional Party (Italian: Partito Liberale Costituzionale, PLC) was a political party in Italy, born to represent the liberal-conservative and anti-Trasformismo wing of the Historical Right. Their members were usually labeled as Constitutionals or Liberal-Conservatives, especially during the leadership of Rudinì and Sonnino.

== History ==
Since 1861, the Right's government pursued a policy of balanced budget, maintained with austerity and high taxation. Like the taxations, especially the tax on grains, were unpopular among the rural and middle classes, the Right progressively lost its support. With that, the Right was split into two factions: the "original" Northern liberals, who supported taxation, and "new arrived" Southern conservatives, who opposed the modernization and taxation. On 25 March 1876, Prime Minister Marco Minghetti was forced to resign after the so-called "Parliamentary Revolution": the Left, together dissident members from the Right, put the government in minority on the tax on grains' question, who damaged rural economy. Ironically, many Right politicians who sided now with Left were from North. Since this moment, the Right fell in opposition, and Agostino Depretis, leader of the Left, was appointed as new Prime Minister.

After the fall of Minghetti, the Right progressively disbanded. On 8 October 1882, some weeks before the general elections, Depretis proclaim that anyone who will be "transform" into a progressive will be accepted in his government, and surprisingly Minghetti agree with that, causing the merge of the rest of the Right into the Left. After this event, the rest of the anti-compromise Right was called "Liberal Constitutionalist Party", led by formers Finance Minister Quintino Sella and Interior Minister Antonio Starabba, Marquess of Rudinì. The PLC weren't a structured and organized party, but simply a coalition of both Northern and Southern conservatives, like Sidney Sonnino, Luigi Luzzatti and Pasquale Villari, who rejected opportunism and Depretis' protectionist policy.

After 10 years in opposition, the PLC gain the majority thanks to an agreement with dissident Left Giovanni Nicotera and radical Felice Cavallotti, and Rudinì was charged to form a new government in substitution of Francesco Crispi. During his short government, overthrown after 1 year, Rudinì worked to reduce public expenditure, limit the rising imperialist sentiment and keep Italy aligned with Triple Alliance. Rudinì was recalled in office after the political fall of Crispi, following the defeat in First Italo-Ethiopian War. During this second term, Rudinì worked to repress the Sicilian Fasci, a powerful rising socialist protest in Sicily, but also the nationalist groups. After 2 years, Rudinì was ousted from office after his unpopular cease of Kassala to the United Kingdom. Also in PLC politicians like Luzzatti and Sonnino later formed their own governments, they were short and weakened by the newborn Italian Socialist Party and the first organized parties. The awareness of that forced the Liberal Constitutional Party to join in the Liberal Union, a political alliance between all liberal politicians, many once a time opposed between them.

== Electoral results ==
Chamber of Deputies
Election year	# of overall votes	% of overall vote	# of overall seats won	+/–	Leader
Preceded by Historical Right
1882	unknown (#2)	28.9	147 / 508	New	Quintino Sella
1886	unknown (#2)	27.9	145 / 508	▼2	Antonio Starabba di Rudinì
1890	unknown (#2)	9.4	48 / 508	▼97	Antonio Starabba di Rudinì
1892	unknown (#2)	18.3	93 / 508	▲45	Antonio Starabba di Rudinì
1895	263,315 (#2)	21.6	104 / 508	▲11	Antonio Starabba di Rudinì
1897	unknown (#2)	19.4	99 / 508	▼5	Antonio Starabba di Rudinì
1900	271,698 (#2)	21.4	116 / 508	▲17	Antonio Starabba di Rudinì
1904	212,584 (#3)	13.9	76 / 508	▼20	Tommaso Tittoni
1909	108,029 (#4)	5.9	44 / 508	▼32	Sidney Sonnino
