= Second di Rudinì government =

32nd Government of Kingdom of Italy

Di Rudinì II government
- 32nd Cabinet of Italy

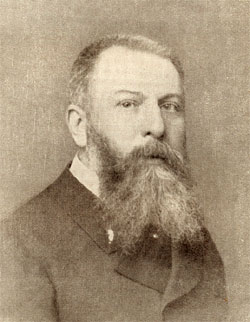
- Date formed: 10 March 1896
- Date dissolved: 15 July 1896

People and organisations
- Head of state: Umberto I
- Head of government: Antonio Starabba di Rudinì
- Total no. of members: 11
- Member party: Historical Right; Historical Left

History
- Predecessor: Crispi IV Cabinet
- Successor: Di Rudinì III Cabinet

The Di Rudinì II government of Italy held office from 10 March 1896 until 15 July 1896, a total of 127 days, or 4 months and 5 days.

== Government parties ==
The government was composed by the following parties:

Party	Ideology	Leader
Historical Left	Liberalism	Giovanni Giolitti
Historical Right	Conservatism	Antonio Starabba di Rudinì

== Composition ==
Office	Name	Party	Term
Prime Minister	Antonio Starabba di Rudinì	Historical Right	(1896–1896)
Minister of the Interior	Antonio Starabba di Rudinì	Historical Right	(1896–1896)
Minister of Foreign Affairs	Onorato Caetani	Historical Right	(1896–1896)
Minister of Grace and Justice	Giacomo Giuseppe Costa	Historical Right	(1896–1896)
Minister of Finance	Ascanio Branca	Historical Left	(1896–1896)
Minister of Treasury	Giuseppe Colombo	Historical Right	(1896–1896)
Minister of War	Cesare Ricotti-Magnani	Military	(1896–1896)
Minister of the Navy	Benedetto Brin	Military	(1896–1896)
Minister of Agriculture, Industry and Commerce	Francesco Guicciardini	Historical Right	(1896–1896)
Minister of Public Works	Costantino Perazzi	Historical Right	(1896–1896)
Minister of Public Education	Emanuele Gianturco	Historical Left	(1896–1896)
Minister of Post and Telegraphs	Pietro Carmine	Historical Right	(1896–1896)
