= Emanuele Gianturco =

Italian jurist and politician (1857–1907)

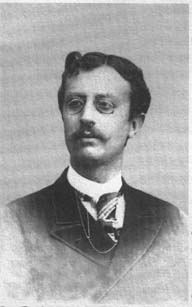

Minister of Public Works
- In office 1906–1907
- Prime Minister: Giovanni Giolitti

Minister of Justice
- In office June 1900 – February 1901
- Prime Minister: Giuseppe Saracco
- In office 1897–1897
- Prime Minister: Antonio Starabba di Rudinì

Minister of Education
- In office 1896–1897
- Prime Minister: Antonio Starabba di Rudinì

Personal details
- Born: 10 March 1857 Avigliano, Kingdom of the Two Sicilies
- Died: 10 November 1907 (aged 50) Naples, Kingdom of Italy
- Spouse: Remigia Guariglia
- Children: 8
- Education: University of Naples
- Occupation: Legal scholar; Academic

Emanuele Gianturco (1857–1907) was an Italian legal scholar and politician who held different cabinet posts, including minister of public works, minister of education and minister of justice. He was also a member of the Parliament of which he served as the vice president.

== Early life and education ==
Gianturco was born in Avigliano on 20 March 1857. His father was a shoemaker. He received a degree in law from the University of Naples in July 1879. He also attended a music conservatory, Conservatory of San Pietro a Majella, there.

== Career ==
Following his graduation Gianturco wanted to pursue a career in music, but it was not supported by his family. Instead, he began his career as a lawyer. He joined his alma mater as a faculty member in 1882 and became a professor of civil law there. He was promoted to the chair of the department in 1889. He was elected as a deputy for six times in the elections of 1890, 1892, 1895, 1897, 1900 and 1904 and served as the vice president of the Parliament.

Gianturco was named as the minister of education in 1896 in the second cabinet of Antonio Starabba di Rudinì and as the minister of justice in 1897 in the next cabinet of di Rudinì. In June 1900 he was appointed minister of justice to the cabinet led by Giuseppe Saracco and was in office until February 1901. He also served as the minister of public works between 1906 and 1907 in the third cabinet of Giovanni Giolitti.

== Personal life and death ==
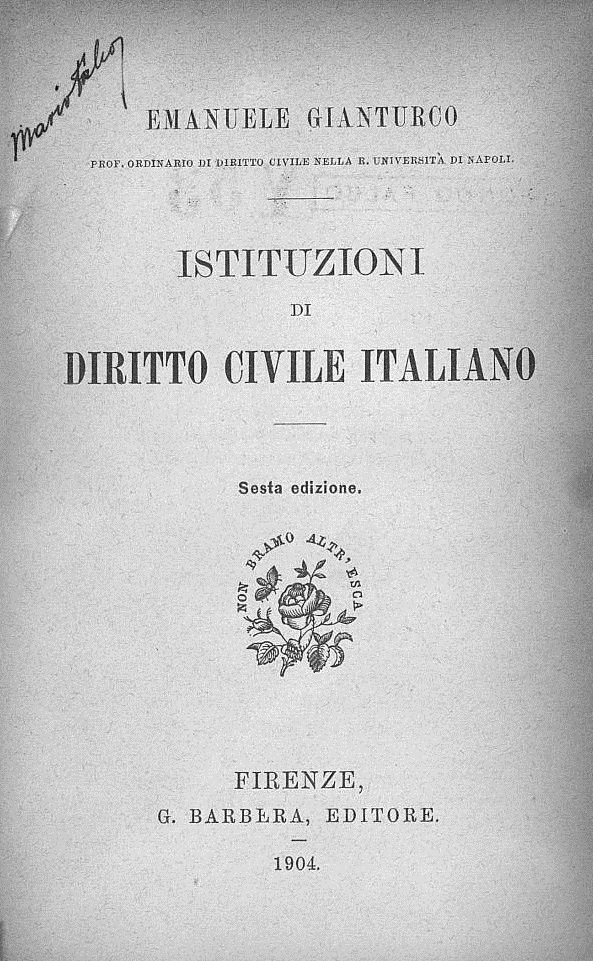
Cover page of his book Istituzioni di diritto civile italiano (1904)

Gianturco was married to Remigia Guariglia with whom he had eight children. One of his sons, Elio Gianturco (1900–1987), was an academic. His youngest child, Cesare Gianturco (1905–1995), was a physician. Emanuele died in Naples on 10 November 1907 at age fifty when Cesare was two-year old.

=== Work and legacy ===
Gianturco was author of several books, including Opere Giuridiche. Edizione Nazionale. These books are mostly about legal topics, and his speeches at the Italian Parliament were printed as a book, Discorsi Parlamentari, in 1909. He also composed musical work which was edited by Alessandro Longo in 1912.

In his hometown, Avigliano, a foundation was established in memory of Emanuele Gianturco. A road in Naples was named after him.
