= Giacomo Giuseppe Costa =

Italian magistrate and politician

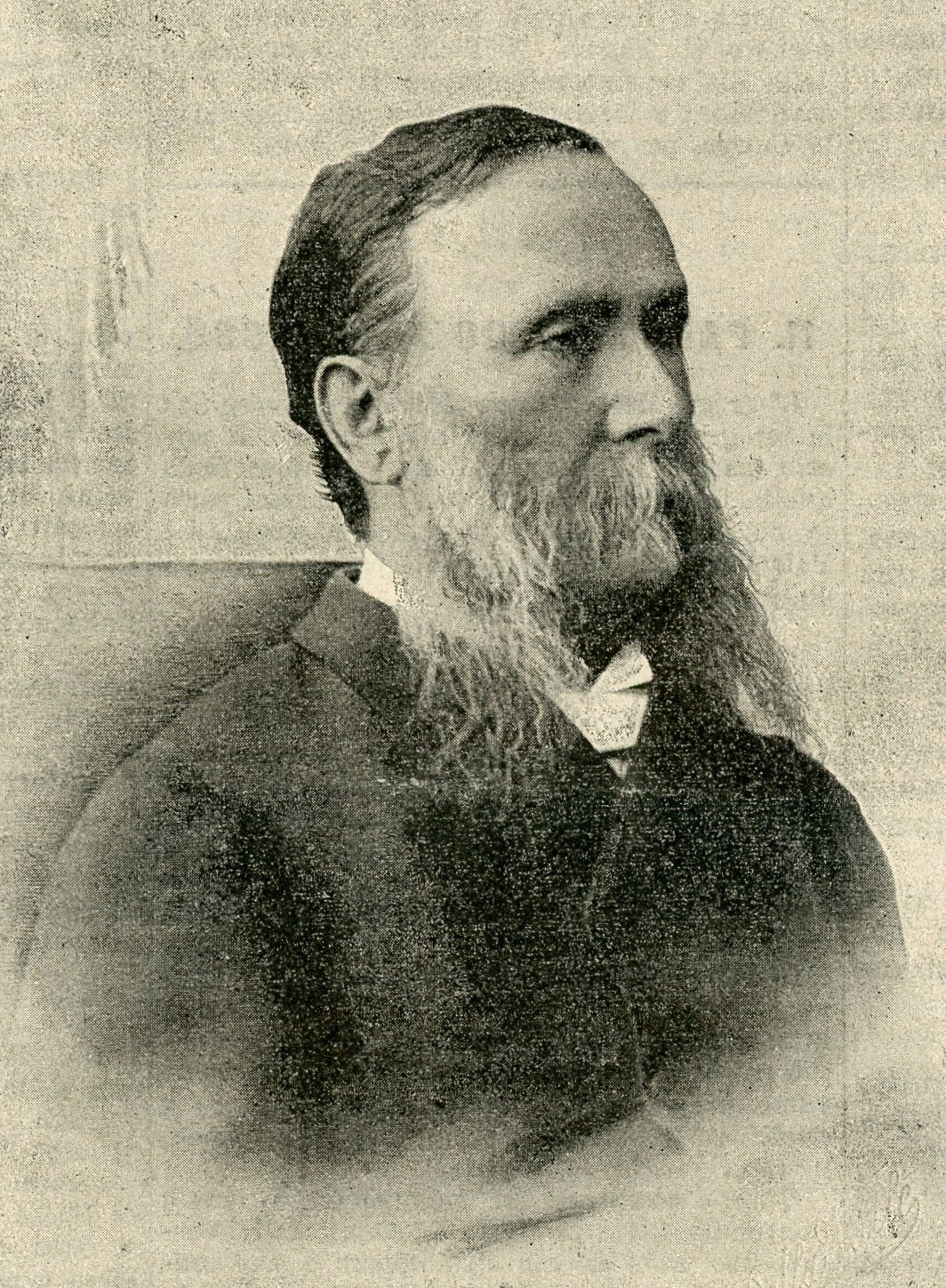

Minister of Justice
- In office 10 March 1896 – 15 August 1897
- Preceded by: Vincenzo Calenda di Tavani
- Succeeded by: Antonio di Rudinì

Senator
- In office 14 June 1886 – 15 August 1897

Giacomo Giuseppe Costa (Milan, 24 November 1833 – Ovada, 15 August 1897) was an Italian magistrate and politician, senator of the Kingdom of Italy and Minister of Justice.

== Early life and legal career ==
While he was still an infant, his father Giacomo died, and his mother, Luigia Missaglia, moved back to Gallarate, where her family looked after them. The young Costa moved from Gallarate back to Milan to finish his studies, intending to enroll at university. However, in 1853, Milan was part of the Kingdom of Lombardy-Venetia, and so Costa was faced with the prospect of compulsory military service for the Austrian Empire - so he left Milan for Genoa, where his late father’s relatives lived.

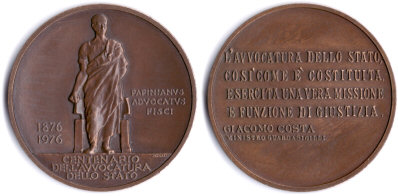
medal minted for the Centenary of the State Attorney's Office bears on the back a phrase taken from one of Costa's parliamentary speeches

At the University of Genoa, he enrolled in the faculty of law where he graduated in 1858 with honors. In 1859, after the annexation of Lombardy to the Kingdom of Sardinia, he returned to Milan, participating in government commissions for the examination of the penal and civil code and for the bill revising the judicial system in the new territory. In appreciation of the services rendered in these Commissions, he was invited, in July 1860, to take up a post at the Court of Appeal of Milan, where he remained until 1867 with the rank of Deputy Attorney General. During his career in the judiciary, he served as Attorney General at the Courts of Appeal of Venice, Genoa, Ancona and Palermo.

On 12 June 1885, Giuseppe Mantellini, creator of the State Attorney's Office, died and Prime Minister Agostino Depretis invited Costa to succeed him.

== Senator and Minister ==
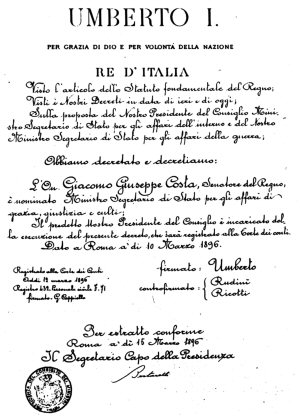
The royal decree making Costa a minister

In 1886 he was appointed Senator of the Kingdom and his numerous interventions (often as rapporteur of bills) are widely documented in the Senate Archives. In 1894 he performed the very delicate role of rapporteur for the Commission into the culpability of judicial officials following the Banca Romana scandal.

On 10 March 1896 he assumed the position of Minister of Justice in the Second di Rudinì government, formed after the resignation of the Crispi ministry following the defeat at the battle of Adwa. He was also confirmed in the reshuffle after the crisis of 11 July 1896.

He held this position for about fifteen months although he was becoming progressively more unwell with cancer. Despite his illness, at the end of June and the beginning of July Costa supported the complex discussion of his Ministry's budget. Always calm, he refused to stop working. That summer terrible news reached him: the sudden death of one of his sons in Turin. He allowed himself just twenty-four hours to attend the funeral before returning to work. Only after the discussion of his budget in the Senate did he agree to retire with his family to the countryside in Ovada, his home since his marriage to seventeen-year-old Maria Luigia Pesci in 1860. In less than a month he felt he was nearing the end. In his last moments he sent the a telegram to king Umberto and queen Margherita with these words: "Dying, I send Your Excellency my final greeting and the expression of my devotion, which ceases only with life." Both the king and the queen were deeply moved by his message and responded, the King, from Valsavaranche and the Queen from Gressoney responded, but by the time their telegrams arrived in Ovada, Costa’s suffering had already ended. His last words, addressed to his worthy wife, were: "I'm going to join our son".

He died in Ovada at 5.20pm on 15 August 1897.

== Honours ==
Cavaliere di Gran Croce decorato di Gran Cordone dell'Ordine dei Santi Maurizio e Lazzaro - ribbon for ordinary uniform

Knight Grand Cordon of the Order of Saints Maurice and Lazarus

Cavaliere di Gran Croce decorato di Gran Cordone dell'Ordine della Corona d'Italia - ribbon for ordinary uniform

Knight Grand Cordon of the Order of the Crown of Italy
