= Stanislao Mocenni =

Italian military officer and politician (1837–1907)

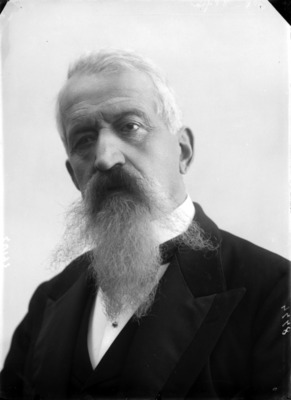

Minister of War
- In office 1893–1896
- Prime Minister: Francesco Crispi

Personal details
- Born: 21 March 1837 Siena, Grand Duchy of Tuscany
- Died: 21 March 1907 (aged 70) Siena, Kingdom of Italy
- Party: Monarchist Party
- Occupation: Army general

Stanislao Mocenni (1837–1907) was an Italian military officer and politician. He served as minister of war between 1893 and 1896. He was a member of the Parliament of the Kingdom of Italy.

== Biography ==
Mocenni was born in Sienna 21 March 1837 into a noble family. He attended the military high school in Florence and obtained a diploma in applied mathematics in September 1857. Then he served as a second lieutenant in the 1st infantry battalion of the Grand Ducal Army of Tuscany. He joined the Italian army in March 1860. He taught at the military school in Turin. He was assigned to the higher command of the general staff corps and was sent to Germany as a military attaché, a position that held from 1 December 1871 to 31 December 1873.

Following his return Mocenni was promoted as lieutenant colonel on 7 August 1874 and was named as the head of the Military College in Florence. However, his term was very brief since he joined the Sienese Monarchist Party in November that year and was elected as a deputy from Sienna. His term at the Parliament lasted until 1900.

Mocenni was appointed major general on 22 October 1884 and lieutenant general on 27 March 1890. He was appointed minister of war to the cabinet led by Prime Minister Francesco Crispi in 1893. He served in the same post in the Crispi's next cabinet until 1896. It was Mocenni who proposed and supported the sending of the Italian troops to Africa. His proposal was accepted by the Council of Minister and the Italian troops were defeated in the Battle of Adwa which led to the resignation of the cabinet.

Mocenni spent his last years in Siena where he died on 21 March 1907.
