= Cesare Gianturco =

- Born: February 12, 1905; Naples
- Died: August 25, 1995 (aged 90); Urbana, Illinois
- Known for: Gianturco-Roubin coronary stent
- Scientific career
- Fields: Interventional radiology
- Institutions: MD Anderson Hospital

Cesare Gianturco (February 12, 1905 – August 25, 1995) was an Italian-American physician and one of the earliest contributors to the specialty of interventional radiology. After many years as the radiology chief at the Carle Clinic in Illinois and a faculty member at the University of Illinois College of Medicine, Gianturco moved to Houston, where he conducted research at MD Anderson Hospital.

Several medical innovations bear his name, including the first coronary stent to be approved by the FDA; a wool coil that could be deployed inside blood vessels to stop bleeding; the self-expanding Z-stent; and a vena cava filter to trap blood clots in the venous system before they reached the heart.

== Early life ==
Cesare Gianturco was born in Naples, the youngest of eight children. His father was the Italian scholar and politician Emanuele Gianturco. He attended college and medical school at the Royal University of Rome. He studied radiology in Rome, then went to Berlin for a year of training in pathology. In 1930, he came to the U.S. to continue his medical education by completing a residency at the Mayo Clinic. Gianturco had come to the Mayo Clinic to train in surgery, hoping to eventually join his brother in a surgical practice in Italy. However, shortly after Gianturco arrived in Minnesota, his brother died, so Gianturco decided to pursue a career in radiology.

Mayo Clinic physiologist Walter C. Alvarez exerted an early influence on Gianturco. Alvarez and Gianturco studied hunger contractions in the stomachs of cats using cineradiography. He also worked on some devices with radiologist John D. Camp on imaging technology, including techniques that would allow for visualization of the optic canal and hypoglossal canal.

== Early career in Illinois ==
At the invitation of a friend, physician Vito Witting, Gianturco moved to Illinois to join the medical group at the Carle Clinic in Urbana. Witting had been ill, and he died of acute leukemia on the day that Gianturco arrived in Urbana. Gianturco became a U.S. citizen shortly after his arrival. In 1934, he was in the first group of physicians to achieve board certification from the fledgling American Board of Radiology. He soon became the chief of radiology at the Carle Clinic, a position he held for more than 30 years.

Gianturco's work at the Carle Clinic was interrupted by his service in Europe as a lieutenant colonel with the U.S. Army Medical Corps during World War II. While he was in active practice at the Carle Clinic, Gianturco was a clinical faculty member at the University of Illinois College of Medicine.

== Move to Texas ==
Unsatisfied by a brief period of retirement in 1967, Gianturco sought to return to work as a radiologist. Through Robert Moreton, a radiologist in Houston who had become an administrator at MD Anderson Hospital, Gianturco secured a position at MD Anderson as a professor of experimental radiology and the radiology residency director. By 1969, Gianturco had given up his teaching responsibilities and focused on research. With radiologists Sidney Wallace and Gerald D. Dodd, Gianturco helped to establish the John S. Dunn Sr. Foundation Center for Research in Radiological Sciences.

Retaining a senior consultant position at the Carle Clinic even during his years at MD Anderson, he spent summers in Illinois for most of his later career, but he always returned to Texas before the cold weather hit Illinois.

== Innovations ==
The holder of ten patents, Gianturco may have been best known for introducing the Gianturco-Roubin coronary stent used in angioplasty. However, he invented or improved upon several other devices. While in France during World War II, he had devised three-dimensional X-ray techniques that helped surgeons locate in advance shell fragments in the eyes of wounded soldiers. He introduced the Gianturco coil, a tiny piece of wool that could be deployed from a catheter into a blood vessel to stop bleeding, or to impede or block the blood supply to a tumor. He also invented a type of inferior vena cava filter known colloquially as a "bird's nest" filter. Cook Medical marketed the device as the Gianturco-Roehm Filter. His most enduring invention may have been the self-expanding Z-stent, originally patented and manufactured by Cook Medical. After the expiration of the patent the Z-stent entered the public domain and has been replicated and adapted for use in various devices by a number of manufacturers.

Gianturco was honored with the Gold Medal of the Radiological Society of North America and the Gold Medal of the Italian Radiological Society. He became known for creating simple and inexpensive solutions to difficult problems. One day, a radiologist had come from another country to demonstrate an expensive solenoid device for regulating the flow of barium during a barium enema. Gianturco showed the radiologist how the same purpose could be achieved with a piece of string, an IV pole and a test tube clamp.

== Later life ==
Though his activity at MD Anderson slowed over the years and he spent more time in Illinois with his family, he continued to visit his laboratory in Houston periodically until he was 88 years old. When he was not practicing medicine, Gianturco enjoyed sailing and he held a private pilot's license. He died in 1995. He was survived by his wife of 60 years, Verna, as well as two children and two grandchildren.
