= Seven and a Half Days Revolt =

Pro-Bourbon uprising

The Seven and a Half Days Revolt (Sicilian: Rivorta dû 7 e menzu; Italian: Rivolta del sette e mezzo) was an uprising in Palermo, lasting from 16 to 22 September 1866. Its name comes from its duration of seven and a half days. It is usually discussed within the context of post-unification brigandage in the Italian mezzogiorno.

== Causes ==
There was a violent anti-government demonstration which took place at the end of the Third Italian War of Independence. It was organized by disappointed former partisans (who had joined the 'Thousand' after their landing and those who had followed Giuseppe Garibaldi in Aspromonte in 1862).

Among the causes were the growing misery of the population; cholera and its 3,977 victims in the city and district; the chauvinism of Northern state officials, who considered "the people of Palermo almost barbarians"; and the heavy police measures and vexatious constraints placed on the populace.

== The revolt ==
Thousands of people rose up, many armed, from neighboring villages. Nearly 4,000 rebels attacked the prefecture and police headquarters, killing the inspector general of the Public Security Guard Corps. The city remained in the hands of insurgents and the revolt also spread in the following days to neighboring towns including Monreale and Misilmeri: it was estimated that the total number of armed insurgents was about 40,000 in the province of Palermo. In those days of skirmishing, they killed twenty-one policemen and ten public security guards. Palermo remained in the hands of insurgents for seven days.

The uprising in general was disorganized and without much motive beyond general discontent and resentment towards the new government and local developments. It is often stated that the insurgents in Palermo were instigated by pro-Bourbon and republican sentiments; however, these sentiments were overshadowed by popular anger. Besides the politically motivated sackings, as exemplified by the insurgent's targeting of Marquis di Rudinì, witnesses would report a degree of restraint on the part of the insurgents, and due respect was given to those who were wounded and imprisoned.

== Government reaction ==
The Italian government decided to proclaim a state of siege and to institute harsh repression against the people of Palermo. It had to re-deploy the army commanded by Raffaele Cadorna, while ships of the Royal Navy, with the King's flagship Re di Portogallo, bombed the city. After the landing of the footsoldiers of the Royal Navy to quell the revolt, many of the rioters were burned alive in house to house fighting that destroyed Palermo, which required about 40,000 soldiers to be re-conquered.

While more than 200 troops were dead, including 42 police, there is no official number of civilian casualties among the populace. 2,427 civilians were arrested, of whom 297 were prosecuted and 127 convicted.

== In literature ==
Giuseppe Maggiore devoted his historical novel, Sette e mezzo (Seven and a Half), to this affair. It is also mentioned in the foreword of Biografia, Maggiore's biography written by his son and edited by Andrea Camilleri.
