= Giacomo Armò =

Italian politician and magistrate (1830-1909)

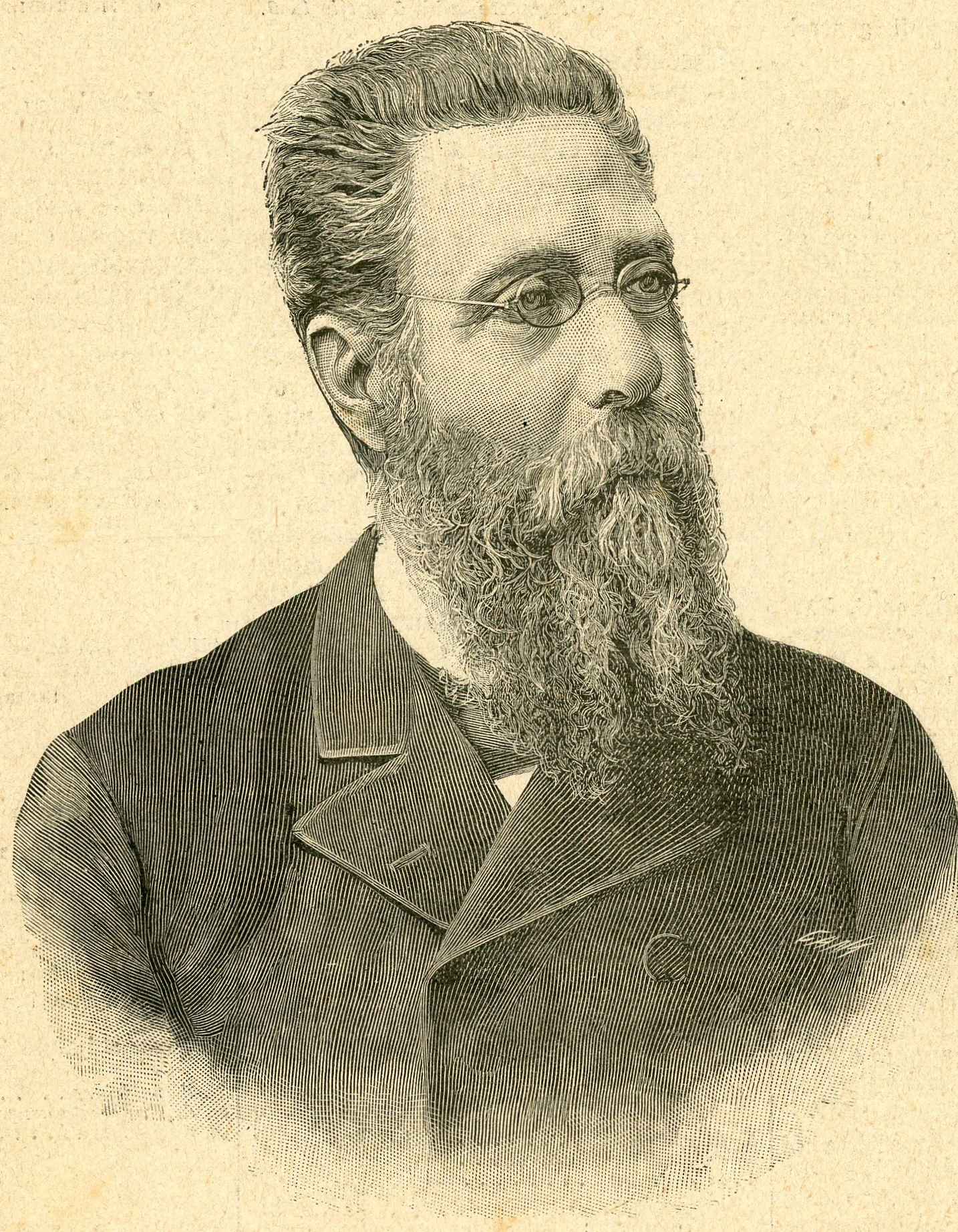

Minister of Justice
- In office 27 September 1893 – 28 November 1893
- Preceded by: Francesco Santamaria-Nicolini
- Succeeded by: Vincenzo Calenda di Tavani

Senator
- In office 13 December 1890 – 9 June 1909

Giacomo Armò (Palermo, 29 September 1830 – Palermo, 9 June 1909) was an Italian politician and magistrate.

== Biography ==
He graduated in law from the University of Palermo and embarked on a judicial career. He was appointed as Judge of the Grand Criminal Court in Messina (4 October 1860), Deputy Attorney General at the Court of Appeal of Palermo (26 October 1862), Counselor of the Court of Cassation of Palermo (9 September 1873), First President of the Court of Cassation of Catanzaro (1 February 1880), Attorney General at the Court of Cassation of Palermo (17 March 1881), Attorney General at the Court of Cassation of Turin (29 November 1885) and then First President of the Court of Cassation of Palermo (4 June 1893 -27 September 1893, 17 October 1893 - 2 July 1896). He was a member of the Ministerial Commission to examine and recognize the behavior and acts of government in the colony of Eritrea (11 March 1891). He was also a city councilor of Palermo.

He was appointed senator of the Kingdom of Italy in 1890. He was briefly Minister of Justice in the first Giolitti government in 1893.

== Honours ==
Grand Cordon of the Order of Saints Maurice and Lazarus - ribbon for ordinary uniform

Grand Cordon of the Order of Saints Maurice and Lazarus

Grand Cross of the Order of the crown of Italy - ribbon for ordinary uniform

Grand Cross of the Order of the crown of Italy
