= Vincenzo Calenda di Tavani =

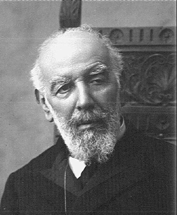

Minister of Justice
- In office 15 December 1893 – 10 March 1896
- Preceded by: Giacomo Armò
- Succeeded by: Giacomo Giuseppe Costa

Senator
- In office 7 June 1886 – 4 November 1910

Vincenzo Calenda, baron of Tavani (8 February 1830 in Nocera Inferiore – 4 November 1910 in Nocera Inferiore) was a judge in the Kingdom of the Two Sicilies and the Kingdom of Italy. He was also a senator of the Kingdom of Italy and Minister of Justice in the third and fourth Crispi governments (from 15 December 1893 to 10 March 1896).

== Early life and legal career ==
Calenda was born into an ancient and distinguished family, the son of Gregorio Calenda and Artemisia de Vincentiis. He graduated in law from the University of Naples. In 1853 he and his brother Andrea won the two vacant positions of speaker at the State Council of the Kingdom of the Two Sicilies. He began his career in the judiciary in 1857 when he was appointed judge at the civil court of Capitanata, in Lucera. From April 1862 to December 1864 he was deputy general prosecutor and appeals councilor in Catanzaro. In 1865 he was invited to assist Justice Minister Giuseppe Vacca in the work of legislative unification for the Kingdom of Italy as the head of his ministerial cabinet in Turin and Florence before returning to his career as a judge.

In the 1870s he rose steadily through the appeals courts of Catanzaro and Palermo before becoming attorney general in the appeal courts of Naples (1875), Milan (1876) and Rome (1876). He was then president of the courts of appeal in Trani (1877) and Genoa (1879). In 1881 he became attorney general at the Court of Cassation in Turin. In 1885 he was appointed attorney general in the Court of Cassation in Naples, a post he held until 1883 when he entered government, and to which he returned between 1896 and 1907 from the collapse of the Crispi cabinet until his retirement.

== Minister of Justice ==
=== Law and order ===
In 1886 he was appointed senator and in December 1893 he was appointed Minister of Justice in the government led by Francesco Crispi. He thus had a leading role in the policy of repression of the workers' and peasants' movement, starting with the proclamation of the state of siege in Sicily following agitation of the Fasci Siciliani, and proceeding with special legislation approved by Parliament in July 1894. These laws established forced domicile, cracked down on incitement as well as support for crime in the press, and banned all associations and meetings "which have as their object the de facto subversion of social orders".

Calenda's policy saw the suppression of all attempts by left-wing groups to call strikes and demonstrations. He issued circulars to magistrates on topics such as "vigilance over the subversive press", "on subversive propaganda in the army", "about the seizure of the Workers' Hymn of Filippo Turati".

=== Banca Romana scandal ===
Calenda also played a key role in supporting Crispi during the complex legal and parliamentary manoeuvres following the acquittal of the defendants in the Banca Romana scandal. Even before the trial ended, Calenda made clear to the Chamber on 6 June 1894 that the government intended to impeach the police officials and judges who had investigated the case, who were suspected of having covered up the role of Crispi's rival Giovanni Giolitti in the scandal.

On 4 August 1894 Calenda set up a commission of inquiry to "examine whether the judicial officials who took part in the investigation of the trial all did their duty, and propose disciplinary or other measures that were deemed appropriate" The commission found fault with the conduct of the magistrates, and Calenda decided to transfer some of them while seeking the outright removal of others. The struggle between supporters of Crispi and Giolitti continued in parliament and the press through 2894 and 1895. Efforts to bring Giolitti to trial were ultimately unsuccessful as Crispi's position in the Chamber grew weaker as his own role in the scandal came increasingly into question.

In the meantime Calenda pursued other projects as Minister of Justice. In June and July 1895 he presented to the Chamber six proposals for the reform of criminal proceedings. These proposals were widely considered to be a distraction from the work of a comprehensive new code of criminal procedure that had been going on for five years. in November 1895 therefore the Senate commission proposed not to bring Calenda's proposals to the floor for discussion. A few months later the Crispi government fell and Calenda returned to his previous position ss attorney general at the Naples Court of Cassation.

== Honours ==
Calenda's use of the title “Di Tavani” was recognised by ministerial decree in July 1881. He was created Baron Di Tavani by royal letters patent on 20 July 1897.

Knight Grand Cordon of the Order of Saints Maurice and Lazarus - ribbon for ordinary uniform

Knight Grand Cordon of the Order of Saints Maurice and Lazarus

Knight Grand Cordon of the Order of the Crown of Italy - ribbon for ordinary uniform

Knight Grand Cordon of the Order of the Crown of Italy
