= Francesco Santamaria-Nicolini =

Italian politician (1830–1918)

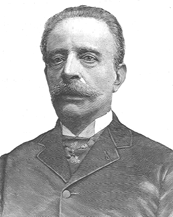

Senator
- In office 9 December 1892 – 22 August 1918
- Preceded by: Lorenzo Eula
- Succeeded by: Giacomo Armò

Vice President of the Senate (14 June 1900 - 6 February 1902)

Minister of Justice
- In office 8 July 1893 – 27 September 1893

Francesco Santamaria-Nicolini (Naples, 1 July 1830 – Naples, 22 August 1918) was an Italian politician and senator of the Kingdom of Italy.

He was appointed as a senator on 21 November 1892 and was briefly Minister of Justice in the first Giolitti government (8 July - 27 September 1893).

== Honours ==
Grand Cordon of the Order of Saints Maurice and Lazarus - ribbon for ordinary uniform

Grand Cordon of the Order of Saints Maurice and Lazarus

Grand Cordon of the Order of the Crown of Italy - ribbon for ordinary uniform

Grand Cordon of the Order of the Crown of Italy
