= 1897 Italian general election =

- 21 March 1897 (first round); 28 March 1897 (second round)

All 508 seats in the Chamber of Deputies 255 seats needed for a majority
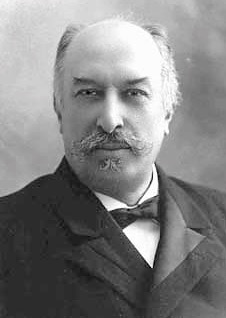

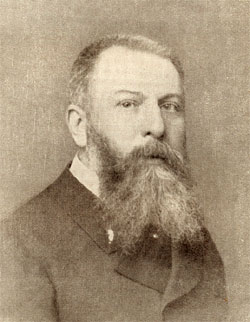

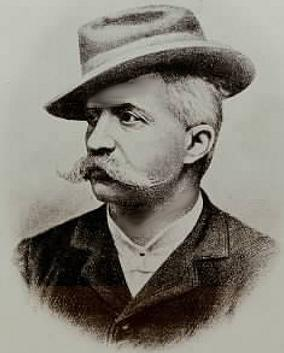

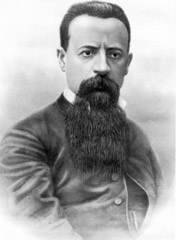

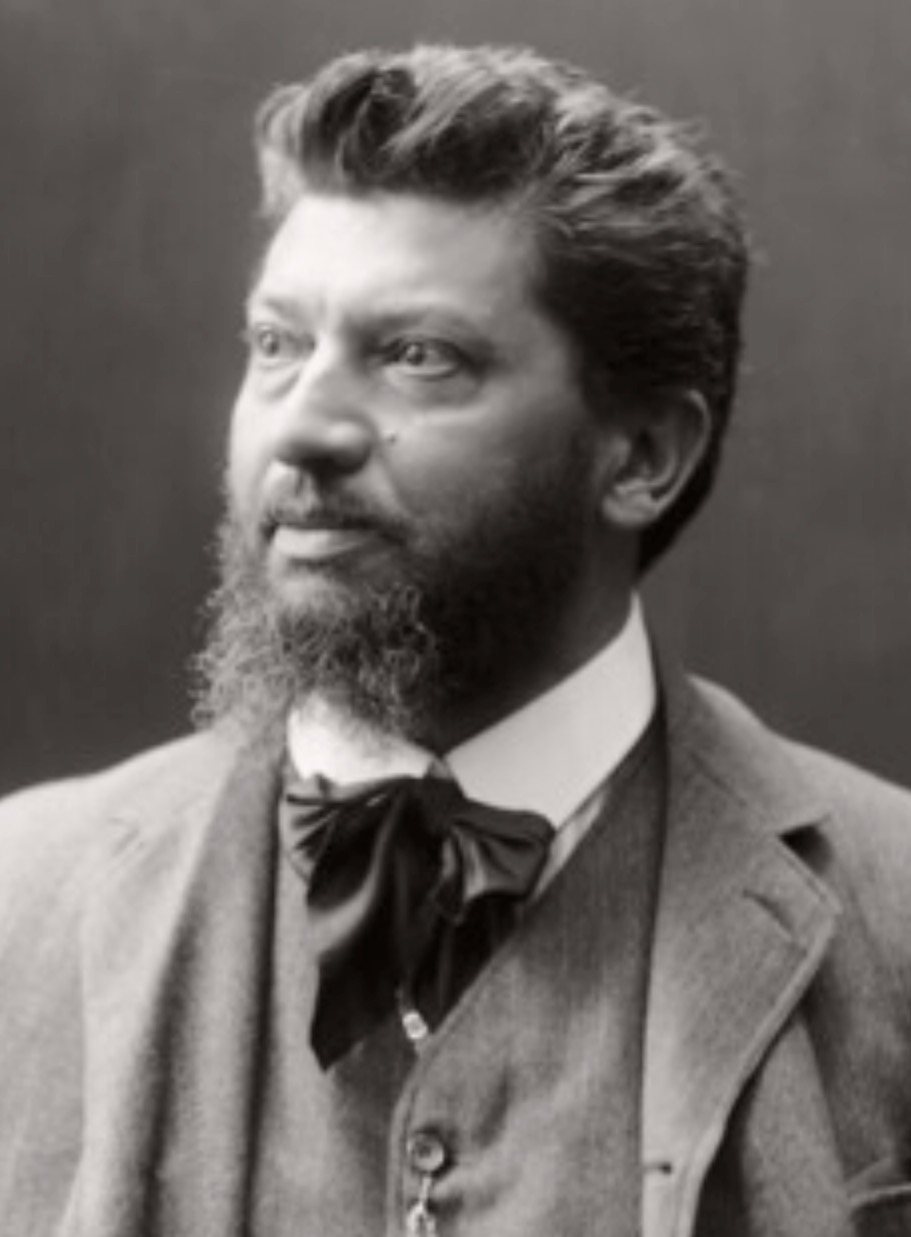
	Majority party	Minority party	Third party
Leader	Giovanni Giolitti	Antonio Starabba di Rudinì	Felice Cavallotti
Party	Historical Left	Historical Right	Historical Far Left
Seats won	327	99	42
Seat change	▼7	▼5	▼5
	Fourth party	Fifth party
Leader	Giovanni Bovio	Filippo Turati
Party	PRI	PSI
Seats won	25	15
Seat change	New	Steady
Prime Minister before election
Antonio Starabba, Marchese di Rudinì
Historical Right
Elected Prime Minister
Antonio Starabba, Marchese di Rudinì
Historical Right

General elections were held in Italy on 21 March 1897, with a second round of voting on 28 March. The "Ministerial" left-wing bloc, led by Giovanni Giolitti remained the largest in Parliament, winning 327 of the 508 seats.

== Background ==
The humiliating defeat of the Italian army at Adwa in March 1896 in Ethiopia during First Italo-Ethiopian War, brought about Francesco Crispi's resignation after riots broke out in several Italian towns.

The ensuing Antonio di Rudini cabinet lent itself to Cavallotti's campaign, and at the end of 1897 the judicial authorities applied to the Chamber of Deputies for permission to prosecute Crispi for embezzlement. A parliamentary commission of inquiry discovered only that Crispi, on assuming office in 1893, had found the secret service coffers empty, and had borrowed money from a state bank to fund it, repaying it with the monthly installments granted in regular course by the treasury. The commission, considering this proceeding irregular, proposed, and the Chamber adopted, a vote of censure, but refused to authorize a prosecution.

The crisis consequent upon the disaster of Adowa enabled Rudinì to return to power as premier and minister of the interior in a cabinet formed by the veteran Conservative, General Ricotti. He signed the Treaty of Addis Ababa that formally ended the First Italo–Ethiopian War recognizing Ethiopia as an independent country. He endangered relations with Great Britain by the unauthorized publication of confidential diplomatic correspondence in a Green-book on Abyssinian affairs.

Di Rudinì recognized the excessive brutality of the repression of the Fasci Siciliani under his predecessor Crispi. Many Fasci members were pardoned and released from jail.

A new party participated to the election, the Italian Republican Party (PRI), led by Giovanni Bovio. The PRI traces its origins from the time of Italian unification and, more specifically, to the democratic-republican wing represented by figures such as Giuseppe Mazzini, Carlo Cattaneo and Carlo Pisacane.

== Parties and leaders ==
Party	Ideology	Leader
Historical Left	Liberalism	Giovanni Giolitti
Historical Right	Conservatism	Antonio Starabba di Rudinì
Historical Far Left	Radicalism	Felice Cavallotti
Italian Republican Party	Republicanism	Giovanni Bovio
Italian Socialist Party	Socialism	Filippo Turati

== Results ==
Party	Votes	%	Seats	+/–
Historical Left			327	−7
Historical Right			99	−5
Historical Far Left			42	−5
Italian Republican Party			25	New
Italian Socialist Party			15	0
Total			508	0
Valid votes	1,199,575	96.62		
Invalid/blank votes	41,911	3.38		
Total votes	1,241,486	100.00		
Registered voters/turnout	2,120,909	58.54		
Source: Nohlen & Stöver
