= Lorenzo Eula =

Italian politician (1824–1893)

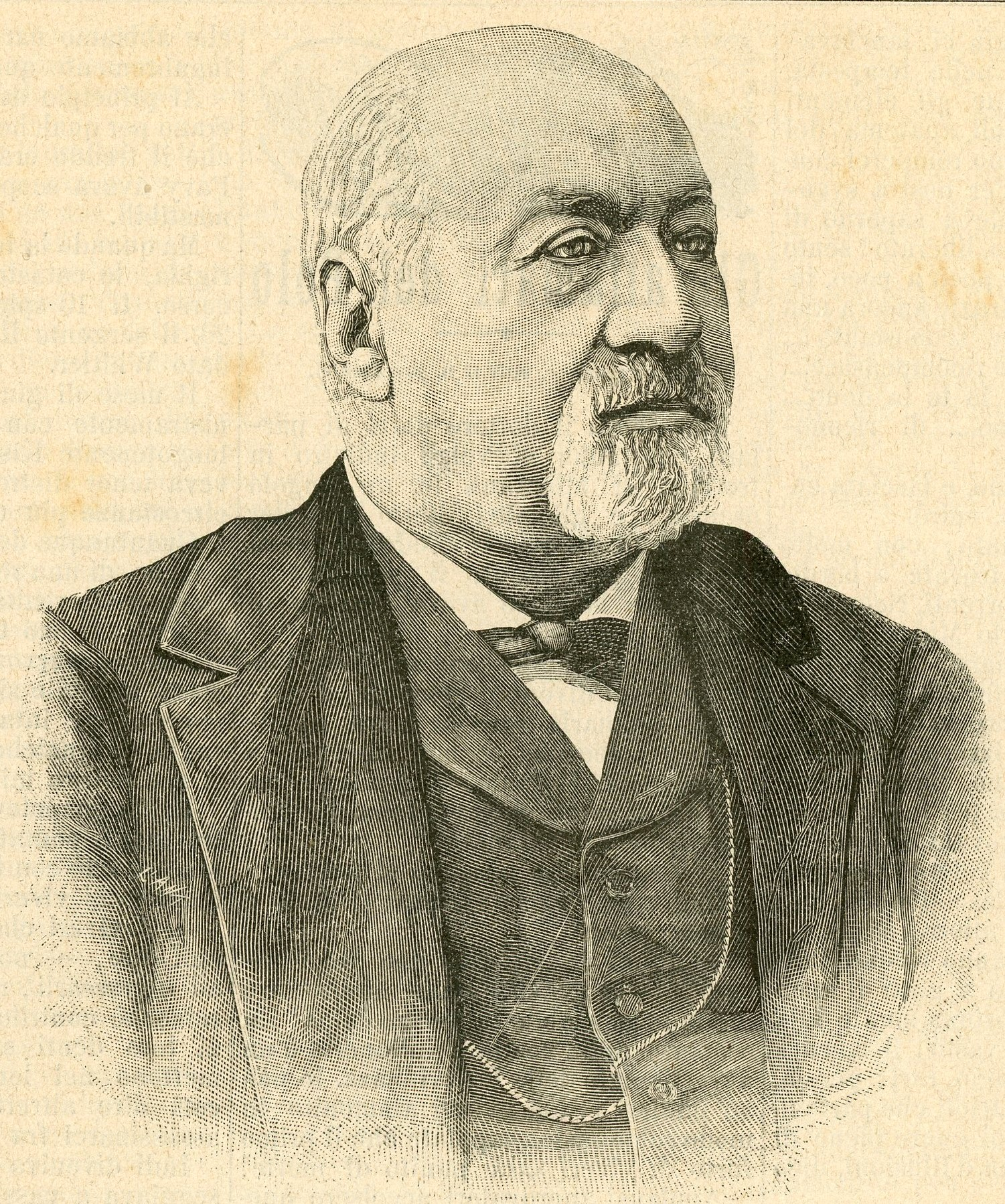

Minister of Justice
- In office 24 May 1893 – 5 July 1893
- Preceded by: Teodorico Bonacci
- Succeeded by: Francesco Santamaria-Nicolini

Senator
- In office 15 November 1874 – 5 July 1893

Lorenzo Eula (17 September 1824, Villanova Mondovì, Italy – 5 July 1893, Resina, Italy) was an Italian politician who briefly served as Minister of Justice.

== Biography ==
The son of Lorenzo Antonio and Teresa Ruffo, he graduated in law from the University of Turin 1844. in In 1849 he was appointed deputy judge at the court of Ivrea, in 1857 he was advocate general at the court of appeal of Genoa and in 1861 he was royal commissioner in Naples, tasked with concluding outstanding judicial business left over from the Bourbon administration.

In 1862 he was first regent of the general prosecutor's office of Catania and then of the court of appeal of Palermo. He was appointed officer of the Order of the Crown of Italy on 7 May 1868 and senator of the Kingdom on 15 November 1874. He served as President of the Rome section of the Supreme Court of Cassation from 1891 to 1893.

On 24 May 1893 he was called by Giovanni Giolitti to be part of his cabinet as Minister of Justice. However he became ill and died little more than a month after taking office.

== Honours ==
Cavaliere di Gran Croce decorato di Gran Cordone dell'Ordine dei Santi Maurizio e Lazzaro - ribbon for ordinary uniform

Knight Grand Cordon of the Orders of Saints Maurice and Lazarus

Cavaliere di Gran Croce decorato di Gran Cordone dell'Ordine della Corona d'Italia - ribbon for ordinary uniform

Knight Grand Cordon of the Order of the Crown of Italy
