= Gaspare di Mercurio =

- Born: 12 June 1926; Partinico
- Died: 11 July 2001 (aged 75)
- Resting place: Partinico
- Known for: Author of La settimana dell'anarchia del 1866 a Palermo
- Spouse: Giuseppa Argento

Gaspare di Mercurio (1926–2001) is the author of La settimana dell'anarchia del 1866 a Palermo. Gaspare also has an honorary title of "Cav. di Vittorio Veneto" as mentioned at his burial site in Partinico.
