= Luigi Ferraris (politician) =

Italian politician

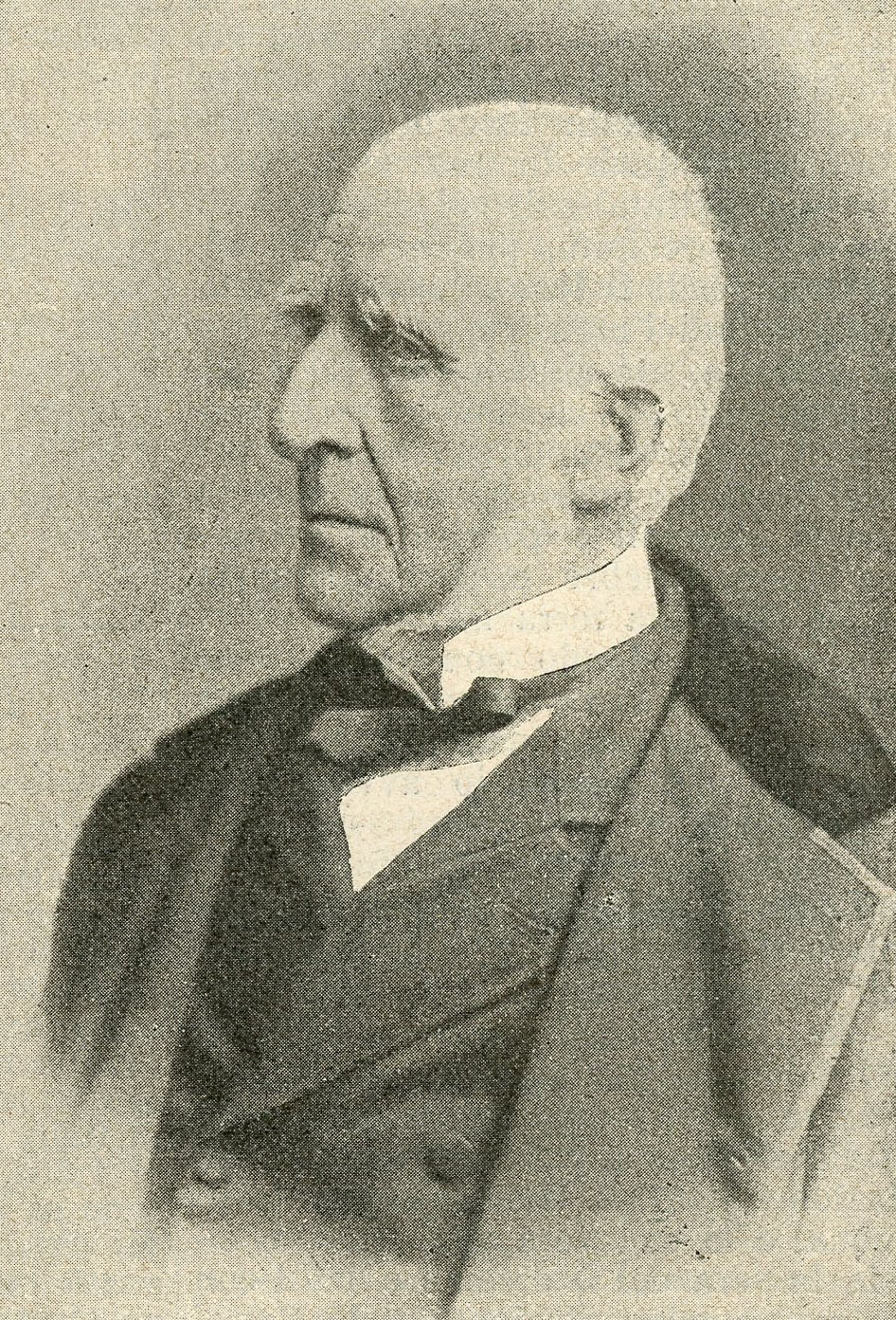
Luigi Ferraris

Luigi Ferraris (6 March 1813 – 17 October 1900) was an Italian politician, who was a senator and minister in the Kingdom of Italy.

== Biography ==
He was born at Sostegno, in Piedmont, and graduated in law at the University of Turin, where he subsequently worked as lawyer.

A liberal in politics, in 1847 signed a protest manifesto against the brutal suppression of a riot in 1847 asking reforms to king Charles Albert of Sardinia. He was elected in the Piedmontese parliament (the Parlamento Subalpino) in 1848, defeating future prime minister Camillo Benso, Conte di Cavour. He was re-elected in 1863 and in the following legislatures, and later he became Senator of Italy (1871).

In 1848 he was a supporter of the First Italian War of Independence, while in 1864, after the Unification of Italy, he opposed to the transferring of the capital from Turin to Florence. Subsequently, he worked in favour of Rome, conquered only in 1870, as the capital of the new country. In 1867 he became vice-president of the Chamber of Deputies and, during the III Menabrea cabinet, minister of the Interior (1869).

Ferraris was mayor of Turin from January 1878 to October 1882 and held for a long period the position of provincial president. He was again Minister, this time of Justice, in the first Starabba cabinet (1891).

He died in Turin in 1900.

| Preceded by Girolamo Cantelli | Italian Minister of the Interior; 1869 | Succeeded by Antonio Starabba, marchese di Rudinì |
| Preceded by Giuseppe Zanardelli | Italian Minister of Justice; 1891 | Succeeded by Giovanni Lanza |
