= Camillo Finocchiaro Aprile =

Italian jurist and politician (1851–1916)

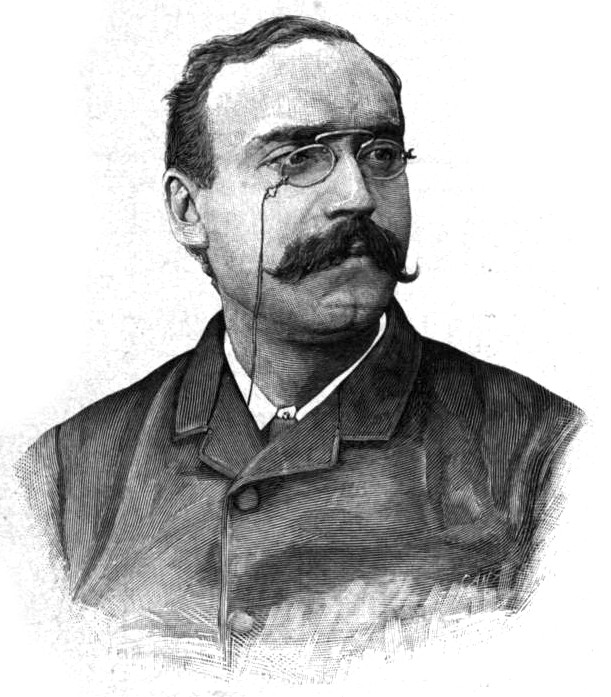

Personal details
- Born: 28 January 1851 Palermo, Kingdom of the Two Sicilies
- Died: 26 January 1916 (aged 65) Rome, Kingdom of Italy
- Children: Andrea Finocchiaro Aprile
- Occupation: Jurist

Camillo Finocchiaro Aprile (1851–1916) was an Italian jurist and politician. He held several cabinet posts and was a long-term member of the Italian Parliament.

== Biography ==
Finocchiaro Aprile was born in Palermo on 28 January 1851. He received a degree in law in 1873 and was elected as a municipal councilor in Palermo while studying law.

He served at the Parliament from 1882 to his death in 1916. He was the minister of posts and telegraphs between May 1892 and November 1893 in the first Giolitti cabinet. He also served as the minister of justice for three terms (1898–1899; 1905–1906; 1911–1914). He was the vice president of the Parliament for four times in the period between 1895 and 1916 with some intervals. He died in Rome on 26 January 1916.

One of his children, Andrea Finocchiaro Aprile, was among the leaders of the Movement for Sicilian Independence.
