= Francesco Cocco-Ortu =

Italian politician (1842–1929)

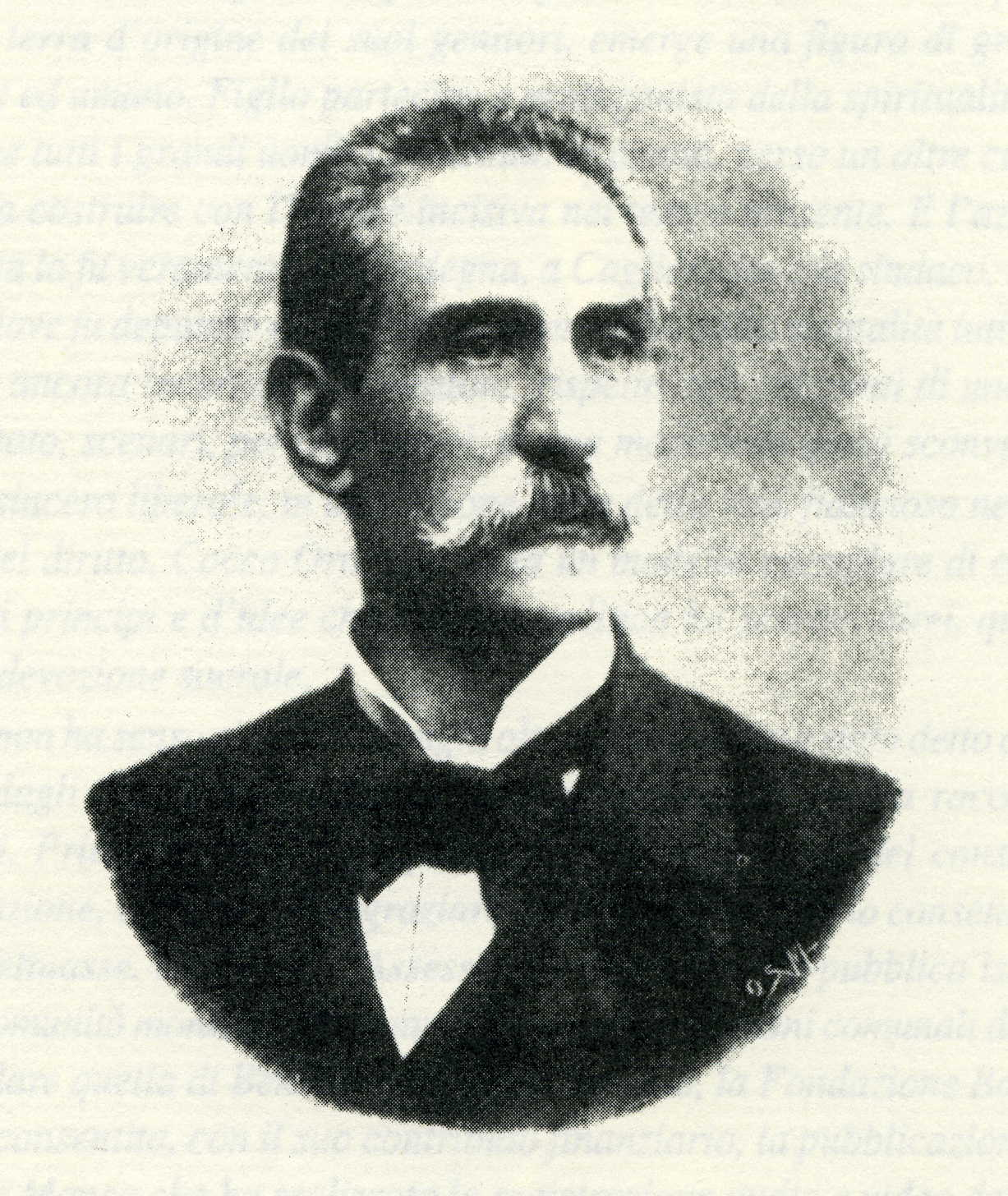
Francesco Cocco-Ortu

Francesco Cocco-Ortu (October 1842 in Benetutti – March 1929 in Rome) was an Italian politician, deputy of the Kingdom of Italy.

== Biography ==
Cocco-Ortu was born in Sardinia, he was a minister of Trade, Industry and Agriculture of the Kingdom of Italy under the governments ruled by Antonio Starabba and Giovanni Giolitti, and later he was elected Minister of Justice during the Giuseppe Zanardelli's government. He was also Mayor of Cagliari.

He founded the Corpo degli Ispettori del Lavoro (Corporation of Labour Inspectors) of in 1906, an authority instituted to counter labour exploitation, in particular child labour.

He was one of the few liberals who voted against the Mussolini's government, he resigned his office as President of the Liberal Party after the Mussolini's election.

== Bibliography ==
- M. Sagrestani, Francesco Cocco Ortu. Un protagonista dell’Italia liberale, Firenze 2003 ISBN 88-8304-570-X
