= Sidney Sonnino =

Italian politician (1847–1922)

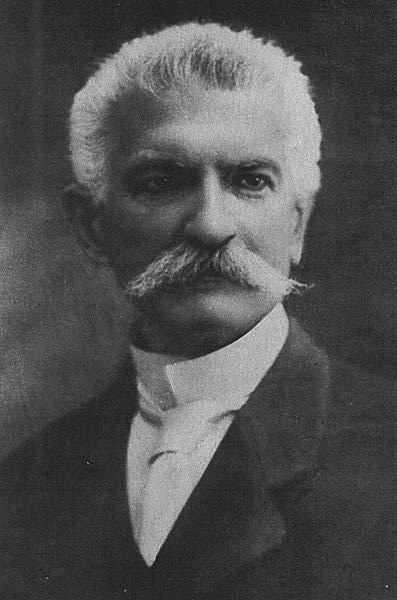

Prime Minister of Italy
- In office 11 December 1909 – 31 March 1910
- Monarch: Victor Emmanuel III
- Preceded by: Giovanni Giolitti
- Succeeded by: Luigi Luzzatti
- In office 8 February 1906 – 29 May 1906
- Monarch: Victor Emmanuel III
- Preceded by: Alessandro Fortis
- Succeeded by: Giovanni Giolitti

Minister of Foreign Affairs
- In office 5 November 1914 – 23 June 1919
- Prime Minister: Antonio Salandra; Paolo Boselli; Vittorio Emanuele Orlando
- Preceded by: Antonino Paternò Castello
- Succeeded by: Tommaso Tittoni

Minister of the Treasury
- In office 3 January 1889 – 9 March 1889
- Prime Minister: Francesco Crispi
- Preceded by: Bonaventura Gerardi
- Succeeded by: Giovanni Giolitti
- In office 15 December 1893 – 10 March 1896
- Prime Minister: Francesco Crispi
- Preceded by: Bernardino Grimaldi
- Succeeded by: Giuseppe Colombo

Minister of Finance
- In office 15 December 1893 – 14 June 1894
- Prime Minister: Francesco Crispi
- Preceded by: Lazzaro Gagliardo
- Succeeded by: Paolo Boselli
Parliamentary offices
Member of the Senate of the Kingdom
In office 3 October 1920 – 24 November 1922
Appointed by	Victor Emmanuel III
Member of the Chamber of Deputies
In office 26 May 1880 – 29 September 1919
Constituency	San Casciano in Val di Pesa (1880–1882); Florence (1882–1919)

Personal details
- Born: 11 March 1847 Pisa, Tuscany
- Died: 24 November 1922 (aged 75) Rome, Italy
- Party: Historical Right (1880–1882); Constitutional (1882–1913); Liberal Union (1913–1922)
- Education: University of Pisa
- Profession: Journalist; Diplomat

Sidney Costantino, Baron Sonnino (Italian: [ˈsidn(e)i sonˈniːno]; 11 March 1847 – 24 November 1922) was an Italian statesman, 19th prime minister of Italy and twice served briefly as one, in 1906 and again from 1909 to 1910. He also was the Italian minister of Foreign Affairs during the First World War, representing Italy at the 1919 Paris Peace Conference.

== Early life ==
Sonnino was born in Pisa to an Italian Jewish father, Isacco Saul Sonnino, who converted to Anglicanism, and a Welsh mother, Georgina Sophia Arnaud Dudley Menhennet. He was raised as an Anglican by his family. His grandfather had emigrated from Livorno to Egypt, where he had built up an enormous fortune as a banker. As a young man, Sonnino suffered from a severe case of unrequited love, which badly damaged his self-esteem. In a typical entry in his diary, Sonnino wrote: "Who can and should love this nonentity lacking all physical and moral attraction?" To make up for his distress when the object of his affection married someone else, Sonnino took to long solitary walks and threw himself obsessively into work as he sought career success as a sort of consolation prize for his broken heart.

After graduating in law in Pisa in 1865, Sonnino became a diplomat and an official at the Italian embassies in Madrid, Vienna, Berlin, Paris and Saint Petersburg from 1866 to 1873. His family lived at the Castello Sonnino in Quercianella, near Livorno. He retired from the diplomatic service in 1873.

In 1876, Sonnino travelled to Sicily with Leopoldo Franchetti to conduct a private investigation into the state of Sicilian society. In 1877, the two men published their research on Sicily in a substantial two-part report for the Italian Parliament. In the first part, Sonnino analysed the lives of the island's landless peasants. Leopoldo Franchetti's half of the report, Political and Administrative Conditions in Sicily, was an analysis of the Mafia in the 19th century that is still considered authoritative today. Franchetti would ultimately influence public opinion about the Mafia more than anyone else until Giovanni Falcone, over 100 years later. Political and Administrative Conditions in Sicily is the first convincing explanation of how the Mafia came to be.

In 1878, Sonnino and Franchetti started a newspaper, La Rassegna Settimanale, which changed from weekly economic reviews to daily political issues.

== Early political career ==
Sonnino was elected in the Italian Chamber of Deputies for the first time in the general elections in May 1880, from the constituency of San Casciano in Val di Pesa. He belonged to the chamber to September 1919 from the XIV to XXIV legislature and supported universal suffrage. Sonnino soon became one of the leading opponents of the Liberal Left. As a strict constitutionalist, he favoured a strong government to resist the pressure of special interests, which made him a conservative liberal.

In December 1893, he became Minister of Finance (December 1893 – June 1894) and Minister of the Treasury (December 1893 – March 1896) in the government of Francesco Crispi and tried to solve the Banca Romana scandal. Sonnino envisaged establishing a single bank of issue, but the main priority of his bank reform was to rapidly solve the financial problems of the Banca Romana and to cover up the scandal that involved the political class, rather than to design a new national banking system. The newly established Banca d'Italia was the result of a merger of three existing banks of issue (the Banca Nazionale and two banks from Tuscany). Regional interests were still strong, which caused the compromise of the plurality of note issuance with the Banco di Napoli and the Banco di Sicilia and the provision for tighter state control.

As Minister of the Treasury, Sonnino restructured public finances, imposed new taxes and cut public spending. The budget deficit was sharply reduced from 174 million lire in 1893–94 to 36 million in 1896–97. After the fall of the Crispi government as a result of the lost Battle of Adwa in March 1896, he served as the leader of the opposition conservatives against the liberal Giovanni Giolitti. In January 1897, Sonnino published an article, Torniamo allo Statuto (Let's go back to the Statute), in which he sounded the alarm about the threats that the clergy, the republicans and the socialists posed to liberalism. He called for the abolition of the parliamentary government and the return of the royal prerogative to appoint and to dismiss the prime minister without consulting parliament, which he considered to be the only possible way to avert the danger. In 1901, he founded a new major newspaper, Il Giornale d'Italia.

== Opposition and Prime Minister ==
In response to the social reforms presented by Prime Minister Giuseppe Zanardelli in November 1902, Sonnino introduced a reform bill to alleviate poverty in southern Italy that provided for a reduction of the land tax in Sicily, Calabria and Sardinia; the facilitation of agricultural credit; the re-establishment of the system of a perpetual lease for smallholdings (emphyteusis) and the dissemination and the enhancement of agrarian contracts to combine the interests of farmers with those of the landowners. Sonnino criticised the usual approach to solve the crisis through public works: "to construct railways where there is no trade is like giving a spoon to a man who has nothing to eat."

Sonnino's uncompromising severity towards others long proved to be an obstacle to forming his own government. Nevertheless, Sonnino served twice briefly as prime minister. On 8 February 1906, Sonnino formed his first government, which lasted only three months. On 18 May 1906, after a mere 100 days, he was forced to resign. He proposed major changes to transform Southern Italy, which provoked opposition from the ruling groups. Land taxes were to be reduced by one third except for the largest landowners. He also proposed the establishment of provincial banks and subsidies to schools. His reforms provoked opposition from the ruling groups, and he was succeeded by Giovanni Giolitti.

On 11 December 1909, Sonnino formed his second government with a strong connotation to the centre-right, but it did not last much longer and fell on 21 March 1910.

== First World War ==
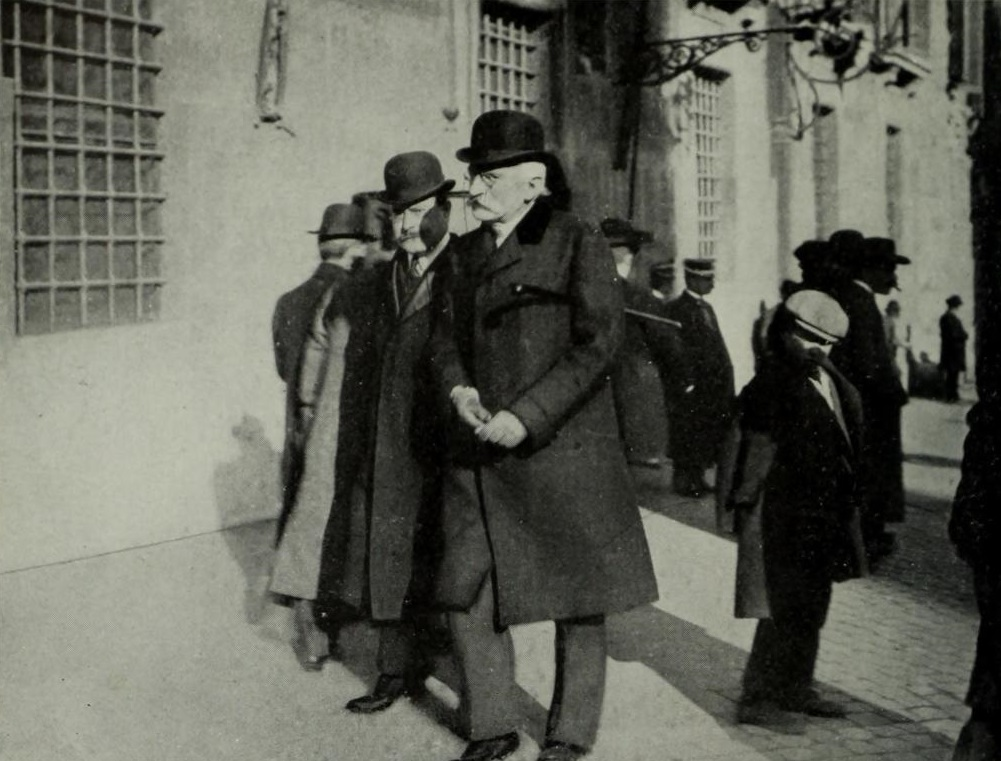
Sidney Sonnino as Foreign Minister

After the July Crisis, Sonnino initially supported maintaining the Triple Alliance with Germany and Austria-Hungary in 1914. He firmly believed that Italian self-interest entailed participation in the war, with its prospect of Italian territorial gains as a completion of Italian unification. However, after becoming Foreign Minister in November 1914 in the conservative government of Antonio Salandra and realising that it was unlikely to secure Austro-Hungarian agreement to concede territories to Italy, he sided with the Triple Entente of the United Kingdom, France and Russia, and he sanctioned the secret Treaty of London in April 1915 to fulfil Italian irredentist claims. Italy declared war on Austria-Hungary on 23 May 1915. During the talks, Sonnino omitted to include the largely Italian-speaking Austrian city of Fiume (modern Rijeka, Croatia) into the lands that were to go to Italy, an omission that he later would regret in 1919.

Sonnino followed what he called a "Bismarckian" foreign policy under which all that mattered was sacro egoismo ("sacred egoism"). The term sacro egoismo as the guiding principle of his foreign policy was Sonnino's way of saying that the interests of the Italian state were to be pursued via a ruthless policy of realpolitik. Sonnino felt no great animosity towards the Austrian empire and no great love for the Allies, and only favoured intervening on the Allied side because the French, British and Russian diplomats he was talking with were willing to promise Italy more than the Austrian and German diplomats. Sonnino admitted in private that he would have favoured having Italy enter the war on the side of the Central Powers if only their diplomats had promised more than the Allied diplomats. The Australian historian R. J. B. Bosworth wrote it was not true that Italy entered the war in 1915 because of the Italian cabinet was "stumbling over the brink into the boiling cauldron of war", but rather as an act of cold calculation by Salandra and Sonnino to achieve what they viewed as rightful Italian national interests. Bosworth wrote that the only way that Italy's entry in the First World War can be seen as a mistake was the belief by Salandra and Sonnino that Italy would be able to swiftly defeat the Austrian empire as the both prime minister and the foreign minister believed that the war would be over by Christmas 1915.

In October 1917, the Regio Esercito was badly defeated by an Austro-German force in the Battle of Caporetto, and for a moment it appeared possible that Italy was going to be knocked out of the war. In order to encourage the Slovenes, Croats and Serbs serving in the Imperial Austrian and Royal Hungarian Army to desert, Sonnino endorsed the idea of uniting all of the South Slav peoples into a state to be called Yugoslavia ("the land of the South Slavs"). Once the crisis caused by Caporetto passed and it became clear that Italy was not going to be defeated after all, Sonnino performed a volte-face on the issue of Yugoslavia and reverted to demanding all of the lands promised by the Treaty of London should go to Italy. In December 1917, the new Bolshevik government of Vladimir Lenin published all of the secret treaties signed by Imperial Russia and in this way the Treaty of London came to be public knowledge. Sonnino was greatly upset at the Bolsheviks for publishing the Treaty of London, especially as the related diplomatic correspondence to the negotiations made him look petty and selfish as he demanded various parts of the Austrian and Ottoman empires as the reward for entering the war on the Allied side. Sonnino sought to explain away the Treaty of London by arguing that he had demanded too much with the intention of bargaining away the gains made by the Treaty of London in exchange for territory elsewhere. However, once the terms of the Treaty of London came to be public knowledge, Sonnino found himself trapped as Italian nationalists argued that given Italy's staggering heavy losses in the war that it would be a betrayal of the war dead to settle for anything less than what the terms of the Treaty of London had promised.

In March 1918, Germany launched Operation Michael, an offensive that marked the beginning of the Kaiserschlacht ("Emperor's Battle"), the final offensive in France intended to win the war for the Reich. In response to the initial success of the Kaiserschlacht with the British and French hard pressed, the Allied armies were finally unified into a Supreme Command under Marshal Ferdinand Foch. Sonnino objected strenuously to a Supreme Command with the control of all the Allied armies, arguing that it was humiliating that King Victor Emmanuel III who as King of Italy was the Supreme Commander of all the Italian forces should be subjected to the authority of a French Marshal. In response to the Kaiserschlacht with the German Army advancing menacingly close to Paris, Foch ordered the Regio Esercito to go on the offensive again with the hope of distracting the Germans who would have to come to the aid of their Austrian allies. The two most senior commanders of the Regio Esercito, Armando Diaz and Pietro Badoglio, both objected to Foch's orders, saying the Regio Esercito had been badly mauled at Caporetto and to go on the offensive again would risk "another Caporetto". The way that the Italians refused to go on the offensive in the spring of 1918 when the British and French were being hard-pressed on the Western Front greatly alienated the other Allied leaders. In June 1918, the Austrians went on the offensive and were defeated at the Second Battle of the Piave River. The Italian victory at Piave raised the stock of Italy with the Allied leaders, but the refusal of the Italians to follow up their victory with an offensive again strained relations with the Allies. In the fall of 1918 when became clear that Germany was going to lose the war and that the Austrian empire was collapsing, Sonnino pressed very strongly for the Regio Esercito to go on the offensive as he argued that another Italian victory would help Italy achieve what had been promised in the Treaty of London. In October, the offensive that Sonnino had lobbied for was launched and resulted in the Italian victory at the Battle of Vittorio Veneto.

== Paris Peace Conference, 1919 ==
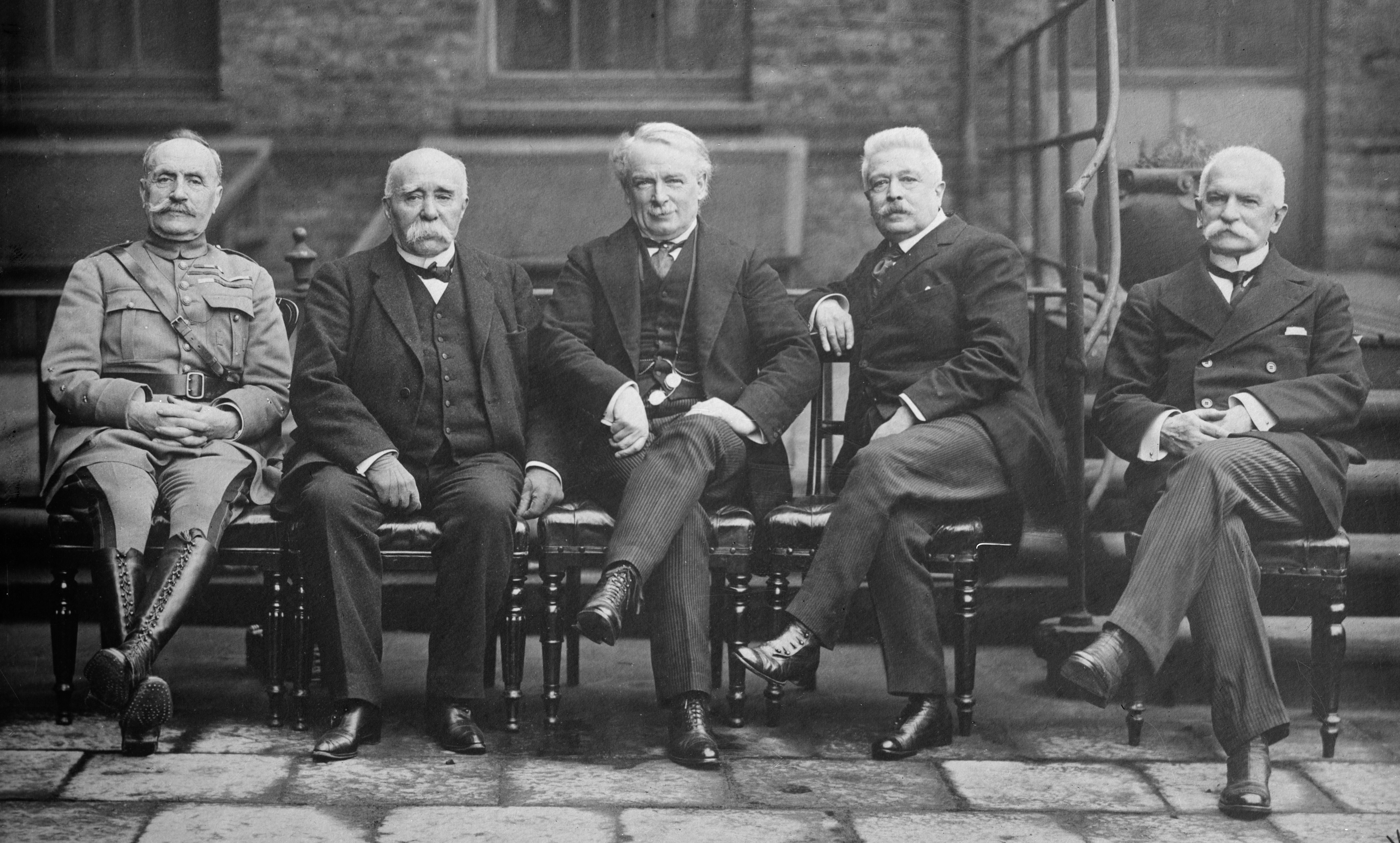
From left to right: Marshal Ferdinand Foch, French Prime Minister Georges Clemenceau, British Prime Minister David Lloyd George, Vittorio Emanuele Orlando and Sidney Sonnino at the Paris Peace Conference

He remained Foreign Minister in three consecutive governments and represented Italy at the 1919 Paris Peace Conference with Prime Minister Vittorio Emanuele Orlando. In January 1919, just before the conference started, the American president Woodrow Wilson paid the first visit by a U.S. president to Italy, where he was welcomed as a hero in Rome. Sonnino was less welcoming as he wrote that he was "disgusted" when Wilson told him that he was sincere about having national self-determination to be the basis of the peace. The Italians had broken the American diplomatic codes, and Sonnino was much offended when he learned that the State Department had debated the merits of having Wilson ask for Sonnino to be dropped from the Italian cabinet during his visit to Rome. Orlando had favoured having Italy renounce its claims to Dalmatia and the Dodecanese archipelago in exchange for American support for Italy annexing the rest of the lands promised by the Treaty of London, but Sonnino chose to take the maximalist position of demanding all of the lands promised by the Treaty of London. However, Sonnino went to Paris, promising in public that national self-determination was to be the basis of the post-world order without being opposed in private, a sleight-of-hand argument that Wilson at first took at face value.

Sonnino defended the literal application of the Treaty of London and opposed a policy of self-determination for the peoples in the former Austro-Hungarian territories. King Victor Emmanuel III chose not to impose clear guidelines on the Italian delegation out of the fear that either Orlando or Sonnino might resign in protest, which would leave the king with the responsibility of overseeing the formation of a new government, a duty that the king wished to avoid. Victor Emmanuel was close to the generals of the Regio Esercito, who advised against annexing Dalmatia under the grounds that garrisoning it would represent an intolerable financial burden on the Italian state. The Chief of the General Staff, Armando Diaz, was more interested in African expansion. In a memo, he called for bringing the interior of Libya under Italian control (something not finally achieved until 1932), the expansion of the colony of Italian Somaliland likewise into the interior; for Britain and France to cede their colonies of British Somaliland and French Somaliland to Italy; and for the peacemakers in Paris to accept "our unique influence in Ethiopia" (emphasis in the original). However, the king did not wish to appear "unpatriotic" by dismissing Sonnino and instead ordered the Italian delegation to secure as much of Italy's "just aspirations" as possible in Paris. The vague nature of the king's mandate with the orders to secure Italy's "just aspirations" allowed Sonnino and Orlando to pursue different policies at the Paris peace conference as Orlando was more open to compromises with Wilson than Sonnino.

Wilson had stated that national self-determination was to be the basis of the peace. However, Wilson supported per the Treaty of London the Italian claim to have the Brenner Pass as the new Italian-Austrian frontier and for Italy to annex the Austrian province of South Tyrol despite the fact that South Tyrol had a German majority. Sonnino often argued to Wilson that because Italy lost half-million killed in the war that felt the Allies had an obligation to fulfil all of the terms of the Treaty of London. Sonnino's cold and aloof personality made him few friends at the conference, and his unwillingness to lobby the other delegates, which he considered to be beneath him, won him no allies at the conference. Sonnino's arguments were described as contradictory and inept. On one hand, he claimed Fiume under the grounds of national self-determination, arguing the majority of the people in Fiume were Italian even through the Treaty of London did not assign Fiume to Italy while on the other hand he claimed Dalmatia and Istria under the grounds that the Treaty of London had assigned those areas to Italy despite the fact that the majority of the people in Dalmatia and Istria were Croats and Slovenes respectively who did not want to join Italy.

Orlando's inability to speak English and his weak political position at home allowed Sonnino to play a dominant role. Their differences proved to be disastrous during the negotiations. Orlando was prepared to renounce territorial claims for Dalmatia to annex Rijeka (or Fiume, as the Italians called the town), a major seaport on the Adriatic Sea, but Sonnino was not prepared to give up Dalmatia. Italy ended up claiming both but got none because of strong opposition to the Italian demands by US President Woodrow Wilson, who had a policy of national self-determination. In point IX of Wilson's 14 Points, he promised that the post-war frontiers of Italy "should be effected along clearly recognisable lines of nationality", and Wilson intended to apply that point in regards to Italian-Yugoslav frontier. On 24 April 1919, Orlando and Sonnino along with the rest of the Italian delegation walked out of the Paris peace conference in protest over the unwillingness of Wilson to support applying the Treaty of London plus adding Fiume. The Italian delegation were welcomed as heroes in Rome, but were soon forced to return to Paris when it became clear that the peace conference would continue without them and that Italy would have even less chance of achieving its ambitions out of the peace conference. Sonnino stubbornly maintained that Italy was entitled to a larger share of Asia Minor than it was promised under the Treaty of London, and received a promise that Italy would have a larger occupation zone in what is now southwestern Turkey. The belief that Sonnino was seeking to add the city of Smyrna (modern Izmir, Turkey) where slightly less than one-half of the population was Greek-speaking, to the Italian occupation zone led directly to the Greek prime minister Eleftherios Venizelos ordering the Greek army to occupy Smyrna in May 1919, which set off the Greek-Turkish war. Bosworth argued that given the antipathy of Wilson that Sonnino did in fact do fairly well at the Paris peace conference as he won for Italy the Austrian province of South Tyrol (modern Trentino-Alto Adige/Südtirol), the ethnically mixed city of Trieste and parts of Istria where Slovenes were in the majority.

== Later life ==
After the territorial ambitions of Italy towards Austria-Hungary had to be substantially reduced, Orlando's government resigned in June 1919. That was the end of Sonnino's political career, and he did not participate in the elections in November 1919. He was nominated senator in October 1920 but did not actively participate. Sonnino died suddenly on 24 November 1922 in Rome after he had suffered an apoplectic stroke.

== Legacy ==
Known as the "silent statesman of Italy", he could speak five languages fluently. Sonnino's main aims were to revive southern Italy economically and morally and to fight illiteracy. He never married.

The only Protestant leader in Italian politics, Sonnino was described as "decidedly British in manner and thought" and "the great puritan of the Chamber, the last uncorrupted man". His stern intransigent moralism made him a difficult man, and although his integrity was universally respected, his closed and taciturn personality gained him few friends in political circles.

A New York Times obituary described Sonnino as an intellectual aristocrat, a great financier and an accomplished scholar with little talent for popularity whose greatness would have been unmistakable in the days of absolute monarchy. He was further portrayed as a very able diplomat who belonged to the "old" diplomacy with an undeserved prominence at the Paris Peace Conference as the typical imperialistic annexationist although the diplomatic rules had changed.

According to the historian R. J. B. Bosworth, "Sidney Sonnino, who was Foreign Minister from 1914 to 1919, and with a personal reputation, perhaps deserved, for honesty in all his dealings, has strong claims to have conducted Italy's least successful foreign policy."

== Trivia ==
On 16 April 1909, Wilbur Wright took Sonnino on a flight at Centocelle Airport, Rome, making Sonnino one of the earliest statesmen to fly in an aeroplane.

== List of Sonnino's cabinets ==
=== 1st cabinet (8 February – 29 May 1906) ===
Portfolio	Holder	Party
President of the Council of Ministers	Sidney Sonnino	Conservative
Ministers
Minister of the Interior	Sidney Sonnino	Conservative
Minister of Foreign Affairs	Francesco Guicciardini	Democrat
Minister of Finance	Antonio Salandra	Conservative
Minister of Treasury	Luigi Luzzatti	Conservative
Minister of Justice and Worship	Ettore Sacchi	Radical
Minister of War	Lt. General Luigi Majnoni d'Intignano	Military
Minister of the Navy	Admiral Carlo Mirabello	Military
Minister of Public Education	Paolo Boselli	Conservative
Minister of Public Works	Pietro Carmine	Conservative
Minister of Post and Telegraph	Alfredo Baccelli	Democrat
Minister of Agriculture, Industry and Commerce	Edoardo Pantano	Democrat

=== 2nd cabinet (11 December 1909 – 31 March 1910) ===
Portfolio	Holder	Party
President of the Council of Ministers	Sidney Sonnino	Conservative
Ministers
Minister of the Interior	Sidney Sonnino	Conservative
Minister of Foreign Affairs	Francesco Guicciardini	Democrat
Minister of Finance	Enrico Arlotta	Conservative
Minister of Treasury	Antonio Salandra	Conservative
Minister of Justice and Worship	Vittorio Scialoja	None
Minister of War	Lt. General Paolo Spingardi	Democrat
Minister of the Navy	Admiral Giovanni Bettolo	Conservative
Minister of Public Education	Edoardo Daneo	Conservative
Minister of Public Works	Giulio Rubini	Democrat
Minister of Post and Telegraph	Ugo di Sant'Onofrio del Castillo	Conservative
Minister of Agriculture, Industry and Commerce	Luigi Luzzatti	Conservative

== Books ==
- Bosworth, R.J.B. (2011). "Italian Foreign Policy and the Road to War, 1918-39: Ambitions and Delusions of the Least of the Great Powers". In Frank McDonough (ed.). Origins of the Second World War An International Perspective. London: Continuum. pp. 66–81.
- Bosworth, R.J.B. (2013). Italy and the Wider World: 1860–1960, New York: Routledge, ISBN 0-415-13477-3
- Burgwyn, H. James (1997). Italian Foreign Policy in the Interwar Period, 1918–1940, Greenwood Publishing Group, ISBN 0-275-94877-3
- Clark, Martin (2008). Modern Italy: 1871 to the present, Harlow: Pearson Education, ISBN 1-4058-2352-6
- Dickie, John (2004). Cosa Nostra. A history of the Sicilian Mafia, London: Coronet ISBN 0-340-82435-2
- MacMillan, Margaret (2001). Paris 1919. Random House. ISBN 0-375-76052-0.
- Mack Smith, Denis (1989). Italy and Its Monarchy. New Haven: Yale University Press. ISBN 9780300051322.
- Morley Sachar, Howard (2006). A History of the Jews in the Modern World, Vintage Books, ISBN 9781400030972
- Rossini, Daniela (2008). Woodrow Wilson and the American Myth in Italy: Culture, Diplomacy, and War Propaganda, Cambridge (MA)/London: Harvard University Press, ISBN 978-0-674-02824-1
- Sarti, Roland (2004). Italy: a reference guide from the Renaissance to the present, New York: Facts on File Inc., ISBN 0-81607-474-7
- Seton-Watson, Christopher (1967). Italy from liberalism to fascism, 1870–1925, New York: Taylor & Francis, 1967 ISBN 0-416-18940-7

Political offices
Preceded by Alessandro Fortis	Prime Minister of Italy; 1906	Succeeded by Giovanni Giolitti
Preceded by Alessandro Fortis	Italian Minister of the Interior; 1906	Succeeded by Giovanni Giolitti
Preceded by Giovanni Giolitti	Prime Minister of Italy; 1909–1910	Succeeded by Luigi Luzzatti
Preceded by Giovanni Giolitti	Italian Minister of the Interior; 1909–1910	Succeeded by Luigi Luzzatti
Preceded by Antonino Paternò Castello	Foreign Minister of Italy; 1914–1919	Succeeded by Tommaso Tittoni
