= Luigi Luzzatti =

Italian politician

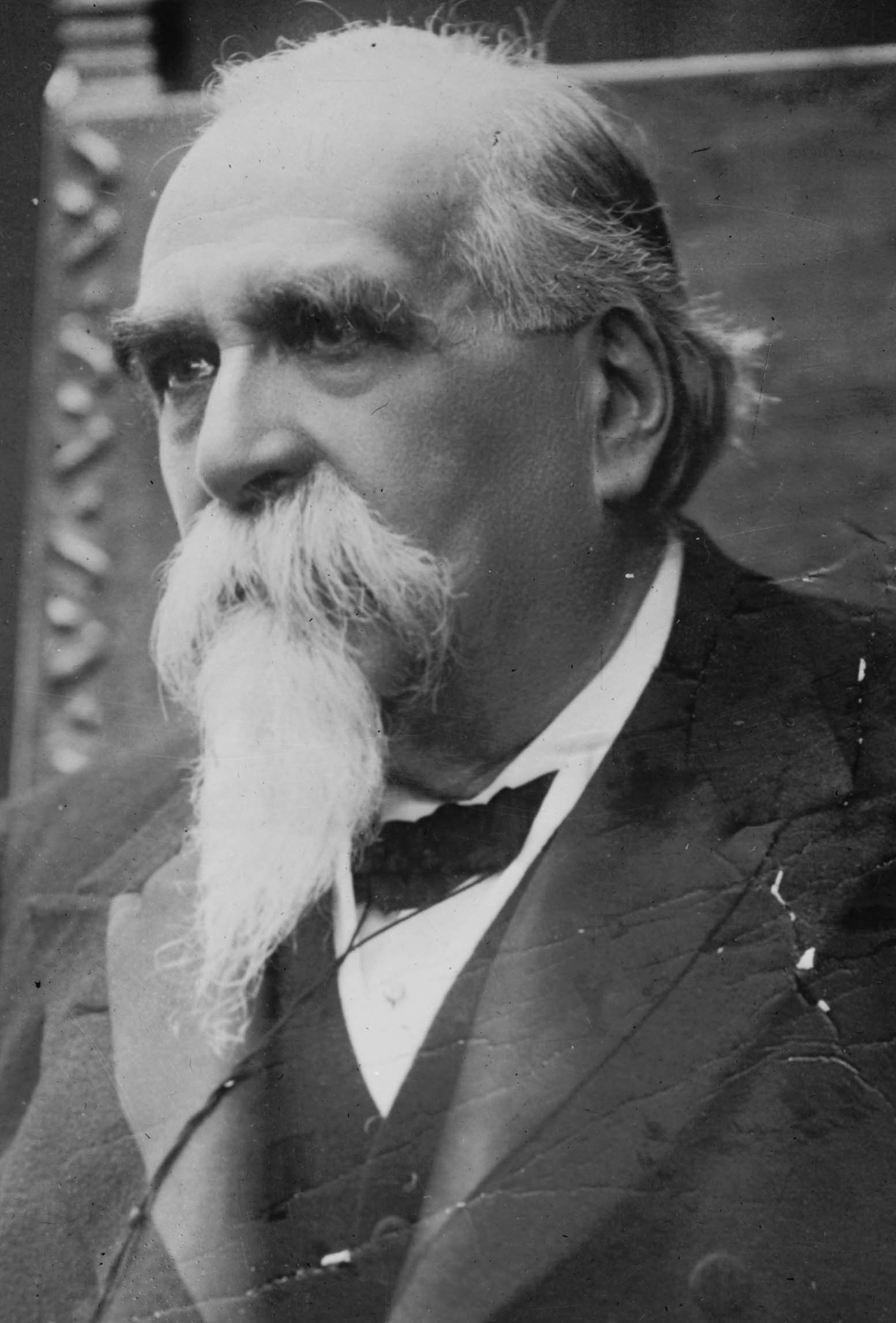

Prime Minister of Italy
- In office 31 March 1910 – 30 March 1911
- Monarch: Victor Emmanuel III
- Preceded by: Sidney Sonnino
- Succeeded by: Giovanni Giolitti

Minister of Treasury
- In office 14 March 1920 – 21 May 1921
- Prime Minister: Francesco Saverio Nitti
- Preceded by: Carlo Schanzer
- Succeeded by: Carlo Schanzer
- In office 8 February 1906 – 29 May 1906
- Prime Minister: Sidney Sonnino
- Preceded by: Paolo Carcano
- Succeeded by: Angelo Majorana Calatabiano
- In office 3 November 1903 – 27 March 1905
- Prime Minister: Giovanni Giolitti; Tommaso Tittoni
- Preceded by: Ernesto Di Broglio
- Succeeded by: Paolo Carcano
- In office 11 July 1896 – 29 June 1898
- Prime Minister: Antonio Starabba di Rudinì
- Preceded by: Giuseppe Colombo
- Succeeded by: Pietro Vacchelli

Minister of Agriculture, Industry and Trade
- In office 11 December 1909 – 31 March 1910
- Prime Minister: Sidney Sonnino
- Preceded by: Francesco Cocco-Ortu
- Succeeded by: Giovanni Raineri

Personal details
- Born: 11 March 1841 Venice, Lombardy-Venetia, Austrian Empire
- Died: 29 March 1927 (aged 86) Rome, Italy
- Party: Historical Right
- Education: University of Padua
- Profession: Banker; Jurist; Economist; Academic

Luigi Luzzatti (Italian: [luˈiːdʒi lutˈtsatti]; 11 March 1841 – 29 March 1927) was an Italian financier, political economist, social philosopher, and jurist. He served as the 20th prime minister of Italy between 1910 and 1911.

Luzzatti came from a wealthy and cultured Jewish family and built a reputation as a social reformer dedicated to raise the working classes from ignorance and poverty. He is remembered being the founder of the Italian credit union movement and for his book Dio nella libertà (God in Freedom), in which he advocates religious tolerance. This provoked an exchange of correspondence between him and Benedetto Croce.

== Early life ==
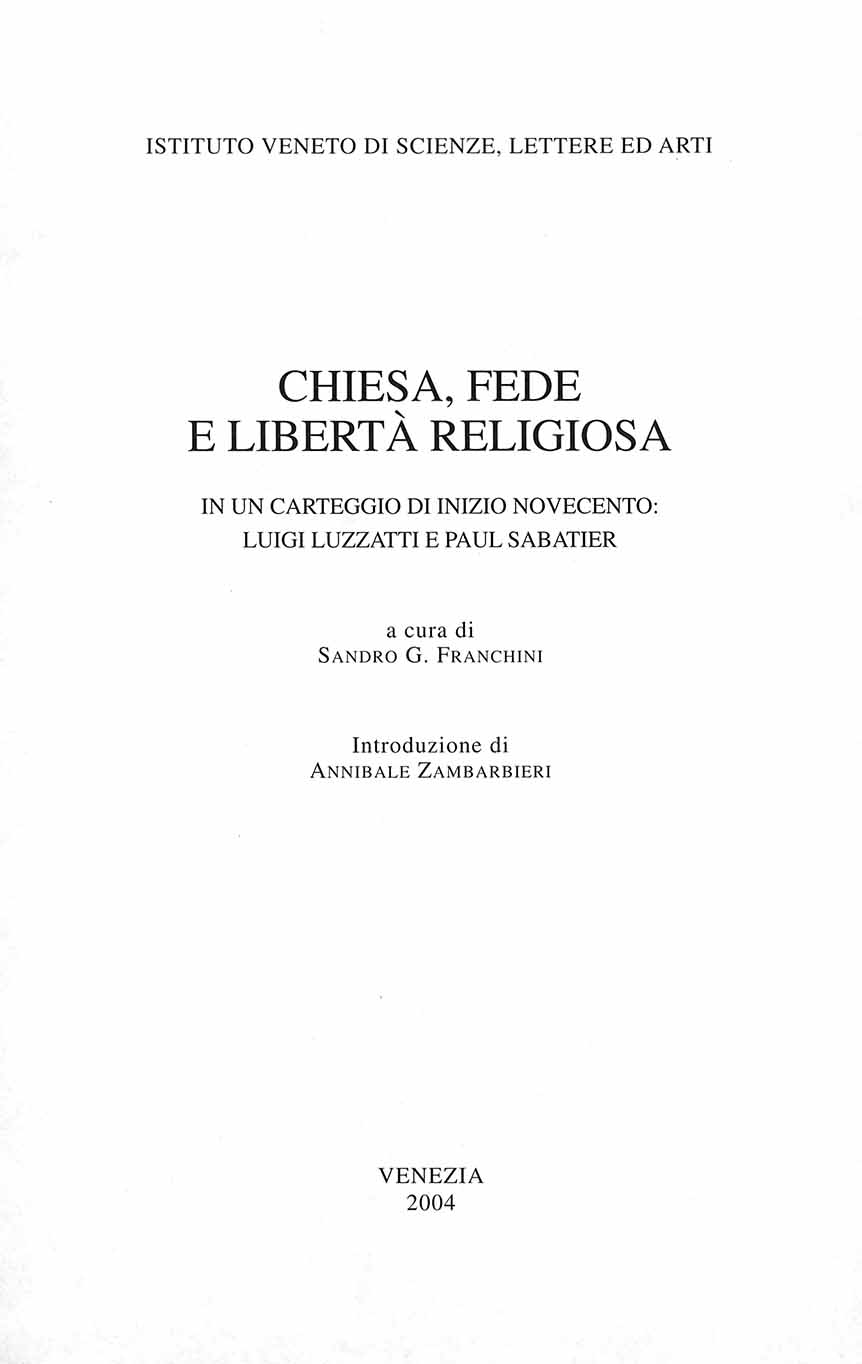
Chiesa, Fede e Libertà religiosa in un carteggio di inizio novecento, 2004

Luzzatti was born to Jewish parents in Venice on 11 March 1841. After completing his studies in law at the University of Padua, he attracted the attention of the Austrian police by his lectures on political economy, and was obliged to emigrate after starting a mutual aid society among gondoliers. In 1863 he obtained a professorship at the Milan Technical Institute; in 1867 he was appointed professor of constitutional law at Padua, whence he was transferred to the University of Rome.

Gifted with eloquence and energy, he popularized the economic ideas of Franz Hermann Schulze-Delitzsch in Italy, worked for the establishment of a commercial college at Venice, and contributed to the spread of people's banks on a basis of limited liability throughout the country. In 1865 he founded the Banca Popolare di Milano in Milan, the second cooperative bank in Italy (the first one was the Banca Popolare di Lodi). The popular banks, modelled after the credit unions Schulze-Delitzsch had introduced in the 1850s, aimed to provide credits to peasants, small shopkeepers and artisans whose only option for capital had been pawnbrokers or usurious moneylenders.

In 1869 he was appointed by Minghetti under secretary of state to the ministry of agriculture and commerce, in which capacity he abolished government control over commercial companies and promoted a state inquiry into the conditions of industry. Though theoretically a free trader, he was largely instrumental in creating the Italian protective system. In 1877 he participated in the commercial negotiations with France, in 1878 compiled the Italian customs tariff, and subsequently took a leading part in the negotiations of all the commercial treaties between Italy and other countries.

== Banca Romana scandal ==
Appointed minister of the treasury in the first Di Rudinì cabinet of 1891, he imprudently abolished the system of frequent clearings of banknotes between the state banks, a measure which facilitated the duplication of part of the paper currency and hastened the bank crisis of 1893 and the resulting Banca Romana scandal. A Parliamentary Commission that investigated the bank scandal concluded that former prime minister Francesco Crispi, Prime Minister Giovanni Giolitti, and Luzzatti, had been aware of the conditions of the Banca Romana but had held back that information.

In 1896 he entered the second Di Rudinì cabinet as minister of the treasury, and by timely legislation helped to save the bank of Naples from failure. Following the revolt and suppression of the Fasci Siciliani (1891–1894), Luzzatti introduced two measures of social legislation in 1898. The industrial workmen's compensation scheme from 1883 was made obligatory with the employer bearing all costs; and a voluntary fund for contributory disability and old age pensions was created.

After his fall from office in June 1898, his principal achievement was the negotiation of the Franco-Italian commercial treaty, though, as deputy, journalist and professor, he continued to take an active part in all political and economic manifestations. He was again minister of the treasury from November 1903 to March 1905 in Giolitti's second administration, and for the third time from February to May 1906, under Sonnino's premiership. During the latter term of office he achieved the conversion of the Italian 5% debt (reduced to 4% by the tax) to 3¾% to be eventually lowered to 3½%, an operation which other ministers had attempted without success; although the actual conversion was not completed until after the fall of the cabinet of which he formed part the merit is entirely his. In 1907 he was president of the co-operative congress at Cremona.

== Prime minister ==
He was minister of agriculture in the second Sonnino Cabinet (December 2, 1909 - March 21, 1910), and on the resignation of the latter was called upon to form a cabinet himself. His administration, which lasted until March 18, 1911, was not very successful and fell over a proposed electoral reform. Although a man of first-class financial ability, great honesty and wide culture, he had not the strength of character necessary to lead a government: he showed lack of energy in dealing with opposition and tried to avoid all measures likely to make him unpopular. Furthermore, he never realized that with the chamber, as it was then constituted, he only held office at Giolitti's good pleasure.

During the First World War, he was consistently pro-Ally and strongly supported Italian intervention, but his tone was on the whole pessimistic. Although he did not take office while the war lasted, he was always consulted on all financial matters, and his sound advice was generally followed.

He became treasury minister in the second incarnation of the Nitti cabinet (March 12 - May 10, 1920), but did not resume office in the third. At the general elections of May 1921, he decided not to stand for parliament again, and was made a senator. In spite of his advanced age, he continued to write on economic and financial problems with his accustomed lucidity and soundness of judgment, insisting on the necessity for Italy to return to free trade and to reduce government interference in business matters to a minimum.

== Death and legacy ==
He died in Rome on March 29, 1927, at the age of 86. He pioneered social legislation in Italy and initiated important social reforms, such as compulsory accident insurance. He also promoted workers' cooperatives, credit unions and voluntary insurance schemes that allowed people to take charge of their future. Luzzatti, nevertheless, remained a typical liberal of his time: he believed that government action to help the poor should be carefully restricted, and that the government should only intervene when private initiative proved inadequate; welfare schemes should not exonerate workers from investing effort in their own moral and economic regeneration.

After becoming Treasury Minister in 1896, he is credited to have saved Italy from bankruptcy. He supported the Zionist movement, specifically agricultural settlements in Palestine.

== Honours ==
- France: Grand Cross of the Legion d'Honneur

== Sources ==
- Ashley, Susan A. (2003). Making Liberalism Work: The Italian Experience, 1860-1914, Westport (CT): Praeger Publishers, ISBN 0-275-98062-6
- Seton-Watson, Christopher (1967). Italy from liberalism to fascism, 1870–1925. London: Methuen & Co Ltd. ISBN 0-416-18940-7.
- Soper, Steven C. (2013). Building a Civil Society: Associations, Public Life, and the Origins of Modern Italy, Toronto: University of Toronto Press, ISBN 978-1-4426-4503-5

Political offices
Preceded by Sidney Sonnino	Prime Minister of Italy; 1910–1911	Succeeded by Giovanni Giolitti
Preceded by Sidney Sonnino	Italian Minister of the Interior; 1910–1911	Succeeded by Giovanni Giolitti
