= Antonio Starabba, Marchese di Rudinì =

Italian noble and politician

Antonio Starrabba di Rudinì
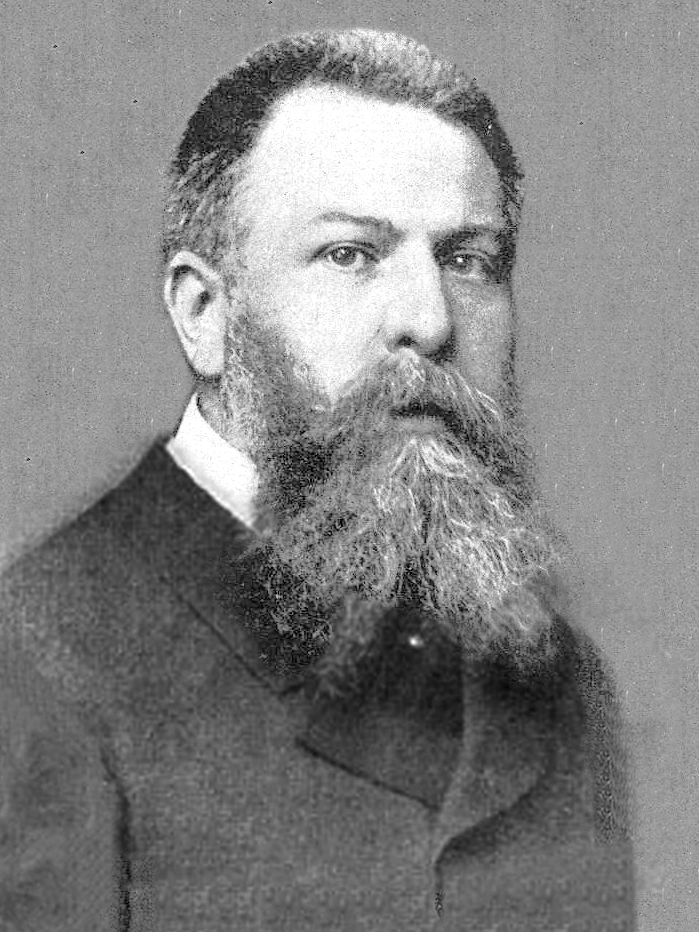

Prime Minister of Italy
- In office 10 March 1896 – 29 June 1898
- Monarch: Umberto I
- Preceded by: Francesco Crispi
- Succeeded by: Luigi Pelloux
- In office 6 February 1891 – 15 May 1892
- Monarch: Umberto I
- Preceded by: Francesco Crispi
- Succeeded by: Giovanni Giolitti

Minister of the Navy
- In office 6 February 1891 – 15 February 1891
- Prime Minister: himself
- Preceded by: Benedetto Brin
- Succeeded by: Simone Antonio Saint-Bon

Minister of the Interior
- In office 22 October 1869 – 14 December 1869
- Prime Minister: Luigi Federico Menabrea
- Preceded by: Luigi Ferraris
- Succeeded by: Giovanni Lanza

Mayor of Palermo
- In office 10 August 1863 – 21 December 1866
- Preceded by: Mariano Stabile
- Succeeded by: Salesio Balsano

Member of the Chamber of Deputies
- In office 22 March 1867 – 7 August 1908
- Constituency: Canicattì

Personal details
- Born: 16 April 1839 Palermo, Two Sicilies
- Died: 6 August 1908 (aged 69) Rome, Kingdom of Italy
- Party: Historical Right (1867–1882); Constitutional (1882–1900)
- Spouses: Marie de Barral (m. 1864; died 1896) Leonia Incisa Beccaria di Santo Stefano (m. 1896; died 1908)
- Children: 2
- Education: University of Palermo
- Profession: Lawyer

Antonio Starrabba (or Starabba), Marquess of Rudinì (16 April 1839 – 7 August 1908) was an Italian statesman, Prime Minister of Italy between 1891 and 1892 and from 1896 until 1898.

== Biography ==
=== Early life and patriotic activities ===
He was born in Palermo (then part of the Kingdom of the Two Sicilies) into an aristocratic Sicilian family. However, his family was of a more cultured, liberal disposition than many of their contemporaries.

In 1859, he joined the revolutionary committee which paved the way for Garibaldi's triumphs in the following year. After spending a short time in Turin as attaché to the Italian foreign office, he was elected mayor of Palermo. In 1866, he displayed considerable personal courage and energy in quelling an insurrection of separatist and reactionary tendencies. The prestige thus acquired led to his appointment as prefect of Palermo. It was while occupying that position that he put down brigandage throughout the province. In 1868, he was prefect of Naples.

In October 1869 he became minister of the interior in the Menabrea cabinet. The cabinet fell a few months later, and although Starabba was an elected member of parliament for Canicattì, he held no important position until, upon the death of Marco Minghetti in 1886, he became leader of the Right.

=== Political career and premierships ===
Early in 1891, he succeeded Francesco Crispi as premier and minister of foreign affairs, forming a coalition cabinet with a part of the Left under Giovanni Nicotera. His administration proved vacillating, but it initiated the economic reforms by virtue of which Italian finances were put on a sound basis and also renewed the Triple Alliance.

He was overthrown in May 1892 by a vote of the Chamber and was succeeded by Giovanni Giolitti. Upon the return of his rival, Crispi, to power in December 1893, he resumed political activity, allying himself with the Radical leader, Felice Cavallotti.

The crisis resulting from the disastrous battle of Adowa enabled Rudinì to return to power as premier and minister of the interior in a cabinet formed by the veteran Conservative, General Ricotti. He signed the Treaty of Addis Ababa that formally ended the First Italo-Ethiopian War recognizing Ethiopia as an independent country. He endangered relations with Great Britain by the unauthorized publication of confidential diplomatic correspondence in a Green-book on Abyssinian affairs.

Di Rudinì recognised the excessive brutality of the repression of the Fasci Siciliani under his predecessor Crispi. Many Fasci members were pardoned and released from jail. He made it clear though that a reorganization of the Fasci would not be tolerated. Di Rudinì's minister of the treasury Luigi Luzzatti passed two measures of social legislation in 1898. The industrial workmen's compensation scheme from 1883 was made obligatory with the employer bearing all costs, and a voluntary fund for contributory disability and old age pensions was created.

To satisfy the anti-colonial party, he ceded Kassala to Great Britain, thereby provoking much indignation in Italy. His internal policy was marked by continual yielding to Radical pressure and by the persecution of Crispi. During his second term of office, he thrice modified his cabinet (July 1896, December 1897, and May 1898) without strengthening his political position. By dissolving the Chamber early in 1897 and favouring Radical candidates in the general election, he paved the way for the outbreak of popular uprisings about rising prices in May 1898. Rudinì declared the state of siege at Naples, Florence, Livorno and Milan, and the suppression of the riot resulted in a bloodshed in Milan. Indignation at the results of his policy left him without the support of both the Left – who blamed him for the bloodshed – and the Right – who blamed him for the permissiveness that allegedly had promoted the uprisings and led to his overthrow in June 1898.

=== Family ===
Di Rudinì married Marie de Barral in 1864 and then after her death, he married Leonia Incisa Beccaria di Santo Stefano in 1896. Leonia Incisa Beccaria di Santo Stefano had a custom of hosting five o'clock gatherings on Mondays in Rome attended by high society ladies. She was an aunt of Marquise of d'Ayala Valva.

=== Death and legacy ===
Di Rudinì retained his seat in Parliament until his death in 1908. Has reputed to be a thorough gentleman and grand seigneur. One of the largest and wealthiest landowners in Sicily, he managed his estates on liberal lines and was never troubled by agrarian disturbances. The marquis, who had not been in office since 1898, died at Rome in August 1908, leaving a son, Carlo, who married a daughter of Henry Labouchère.

In many respects Rudinì, though leader of the Right and nominally a Conservative politician, proved a dissolving element in the Italian Conservative ranks. By his alliance with the Liberals under Nicotera in 1891, and by his understanding with the Radicals under Cavallotti in 1894-1898; by abandoning his Conservative colleague, General Ricotti, to whom he owed the premiership in 1896; and by his vacillating action after his fall from power, he divided and demoralized a constitutional party which, with more sincerity and less reliance upon political cleverness, he might have welded into a solid parliamentary organization.

Many books have been written about his life, including La settimana dell'anarchia del 1866 a Palermo by Gaspare di Mercurio.

== List of Rudinì's cabinets ==
=== 1st cabinet (6 February 1891 – 15 May 1892) ===
| Portfolio | Holder | Party |
|---|---|---|
| President of the Council of Ministers | The Marquess of Rudinì | Liberal-Conservative |
Ministers
| Minister of Foreign Affairs | The Marquess of Rudinì | Liberal-Conservative |
| Minister of the Interior | Giovanni Nicotera | Dissident Left |
| Minister of Justice and Worship | Luigi Ferraris | Liberal-Conservative |
| Minister of War | Lt. General Luigi Pelloux | Military |
| Minister of the Navy | Admiral Simone Antonio Saint-Bon | Liberal-Conservative |
| Minister of Finance | Giuseppe Colombo | Liberal-Conservative |
| Minister of Treasury | Luigi Luzzatti | Liberal-Conservative |
| Minister of Public Education | Pasquale Villari | Liberal-Conservative |
| Minister of Public Works | Ascanio Branca | Liberal-Conservative |
| Minister of Post and Telegraph | Ascanio Branca | Liberal-Conservative |
| Minister of Agriculture, Industry and Commerce | Bruno Chimirri | Liberal-Conservative |

=== 2nd cabinet (10 March 1896 – 15 July 1896) ===
| Portfolio | Holder | Party |
|---|---|---|
| President of the Council of Ministers | The Marquess of Rudinì | Liberal-Conservative |
Ministers
| Minister of the Interior | The Marquess of Rudinì | Liberal-Conservative |
| Minister of Justice and Worship | Giacomo Costa | None |
| Minister of Foreign Affairs | Onorato Caetani | Liberal-Conservative |
| Minister of War | Lt. General Cesare Ricotti-Magnani | Military |
| Minister of the Navy | Benedetto Brin | Liberal-Conservative |
| Minister of Finance | Ascanio Branca | Liberal-Conservative |
| Minister of Treasury | Giuseppe Colombo | Liberal-Conservative |
| Minister of Public Education | Emanuele Gianturco | Democrat |
| Minister of Public Works | Costantino Perazzi | None |
| Minister of Post and Telegraph | Pietro Carmine | Liberal-Conservative |
| Minister of Agriculture, Industry and Commerce | Francesco Guicciardini | Democrat |
Ministers without portfolio
| Civil Commissioner for Sicily | Giovanni Codronchi | Liberal-Conservative |

=== 3rd cabinet (15 July 1896 – 14 December 1897) ===
| Portfolio | Holder | Party |
|---|---|---|
| President of the Council of Ministers | The Marquess of Rudinì | Liberal-Conservative |
Ministers
| Minister of the Interior | The Marquess of Rudinì | Liberal-Conservative |
| Minister of Justice and Worship | Giacomo Costa | None |
| Minister of Foreign Affairs | Emilio Visconti Venosta | Liberal-Conservative |
| Minister of War | Lt. General Luigi Pelloux | Military |
| Minister of the Navy | Benedetto Brin | Liberal-Conservative |
| Minister of Finance | Ascanio Branca | Liberal-Conservative |
| Minister of Treasury | Luigi Luzzatti | Liberal-Conservative |
| Minister of Public Education | Emanuele Gianturco | Democrat |
| Minister of Public Works | Giulio Prinetti | Liberal-Conservative |
| Minister of Post and Telegraph | Emilio Sineo | None |
| Minister of Agriculture, Industry and Commerce | Francesco Guicciardini | Democrat |
Ministers without portfolio
| Civil Commissioner for Sicily | Giovanni Codronchi | Liberal-Conservative |

Changes:

- On 18 September 1897, Giovanni Codronchi became Minister of Public Education, substituting Emanuele Gianturco

=== 4th cabinet (14 December 1897 – 1 June 1898) ===
| Portfolio | Holder | Party |
|---|---|---|
| President of the Council of Ministers | The Marquess of Rudinì | Liberal-Conservative |
Ministers
| Minister of the Interior | The Marquess of Rudinì | Liberal-Conservative |
| Minister of Justice and Worship | Giuseppe Zanardelli | Democrat |
| Minister of Foreign Affairs | Emilio Visconti Venosta | Liberal-Conservative |
| Minister of War | Lt. General Alessandro Asinari di San Marzano | Military |
| Minister of the Navy | Benedetto Brin | Liberal-Conservative |
| Minister of Finance | Ascanio Branca | Liberal-Conservative |
| Minister of Treasury | Luigi Luzzatti | Liberal-Conservative |
| Minister of Public Education | Nicolò Gallo | Democrat |
| Minister of Public Works | Giuseppe Pavoncelli | Liberal-Conservative |
| Minister of Post and Telegraph | Emilio Sineo | None |
| Minister of Agriculture, Industry and Commerce | Francesco Cocco-Ortu | Democrat |

=== 5th cabinet (1 June 1898 – 29 June 1898) ===
| Portfolio | Holder | Party |
|---|---|---|
| President of the Council of Ministers | The Marquess of Rudinì | Liberal-Conservative |
Ministers
| Minister of the Interior | The Marquess of Rudinì | Liberal-Conservative |
| Minister of Agriculture, Industry and Commerce | The Marquess of Rudinì | Liberal-Conservative |
| Minister of Justice and Worship | Teodorico Bonacci | None |
| Minister of Foreign Affairs | Raffaele Cappelli | Liberal-Conservative |
| Minister of War | Lt. General Alessandro Asinari di San Marzano | Military |
| Minister of the Navy | Vice Admiral Felice Napoleone Canevaro | Military |
| Minister of Finance | Ascanio Branca | Liberal-Conservative |
| Minister of Treasury | Luigi Luzzatti | Liberal-Conservative |
| Minister of Public Education | Luigi Cremona | Democrat |
| Minister of Public Works | General Achille Afan de Rivera | Liberal-Conservative |
| Minister of Post and Telegraph | Secondo Frola | Liberal-Conservative |

== Orders and decorations ==
- Kingdom of Italy: Knight of the Supreme Order of the Most Holy Annunciation, 23 October 1896
- Kingdom of Prussia: Knight of the Order of the Black Eagle, 3 February 1892

== See also ==
- Fiorenzo Bava Beccaris
- Umberto I
- Gaetano Bresci

| Unknown | Member of Parliament for Canicattì; 1867–1900 | Unknown |
Political offices
| Preceded by Mariano Stabile | Mayor of Palermo; August 1863 – April 1866 | Succeeded by Salesio Balsano |
| Preceded by Luigi Ferraris | Minister of the Interior; 22 October 1869 – 14 December 1869 | Succeeded by Giovanni Lanza |
| Preceded by Benedetto Brin | Minister of the Navy; 6 February 1891 – 15 February 1891 | Succeeded by Simone Antonio Saint-Bon |
| Preceded by Francesco Crispi | Prime Minister of Italy; 6 February 1891 – 15 May 1892 | Succeeded by Giovanni Giolitti |
| Preceded by Francesco Crispi | Prime Minister of Italy; 10 March 1896 – 29 June 1898 | Succeeded by Luigi Pelloux |
Party political offices
| Preceded by Marco Minghetti | Leader of the Right; 1886–1898 | Succeeded by Luigi Pelloux |
Public Security
| Unknown | Prefect of Palermo; 1866–1868 | Unknown |
| Unknown | Prefect of Naples; 1868–1869 | Unknown |
