= Armistice of Villafranca =

Armistice that ended the Second Italian War of Independence

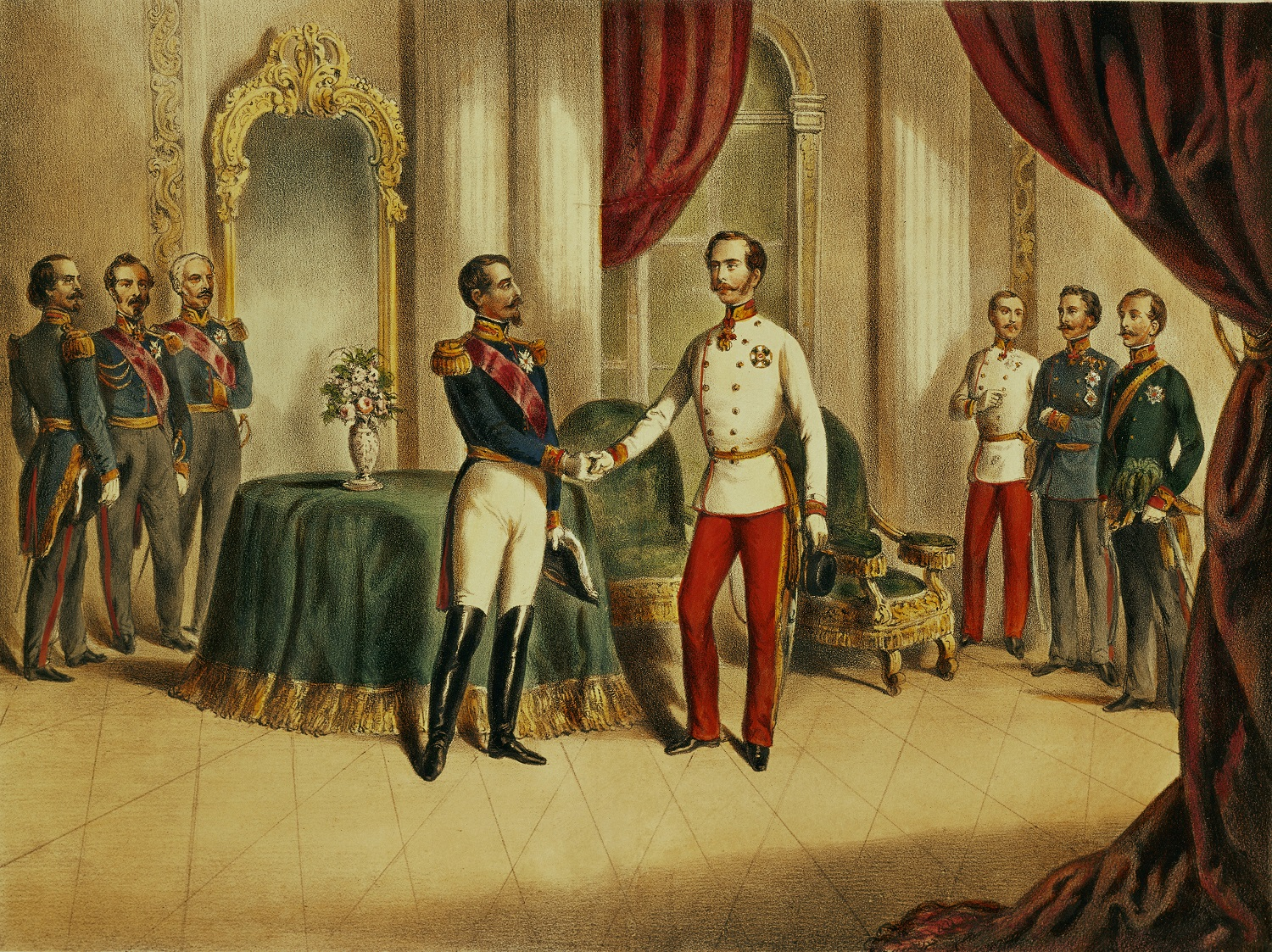
- The meeting between Napoleon III and Franz Joseph at Villafranca in a print of the time.
- Context: Second Italian War of Independence
- Signed: July 11 and 12, 1859
- Location: Villafranca di Verona, Kingdom of Lombardy-Venetia
- Condition: Cession of Lombardy (except Mantua) to France, which in turn ceded it to the Kingdom of Sardinia
- Negotiators: Franz Joseph I of Austria; Napoleon III
- Signatories: Franz Joseph I of Austria; Napoleon III; Victor Emmanuel II
- Parties: Austrian Empire; Second French Empire; Kingdom of Sardinia

The Armistice of Villafranca, concluded by Napoleon III of France and Franz Joseph I of Austria on July 11, 1859, set the stage for the end of the Second Italian War of Independence.

It was the consequence of a unilateral decision by France, which, at war alongside the Kingdom of Sardinia against Austria, needed to conclude peace because of the danger of the conflict spreading to Central Europe.

The armistice of Villafranca caused the resignation of Piedmontese Prime Minister Cavour, who considered it a violation of the Sardinian-French treaty of alliance. The latter provided for the cession of the entire Kingdom of Lombardy-Venetia to Piedmont, unlike the terms of the armistice, which stipulated the cession of Lombardy alone (in its current extent except the Province of Mantua).

The armistice, which King Victor Emmanuel II of Sardinia also signed on July 12, was ratified by the Treaty of Zürich of November 1859.

== From the Sardinian-French alliance to Villafranca ==
Beginning with the signing of the Treaty of Defensive Alliance between France and the Kingdom of Sardinia on January 26, 1859, Piedmontese Prime Minister Cavour began preparations for the liberation of northern Italy and the inevitable war with Austria. In the face of military preparations, Austrian grievances were not long in coming, and on April 24, 1859, Cavour, after rejecting Vienna's ultimatum instructing the Kingdom of Sardinia to demobilize its army, received a declaration of war from Austria.

Napoleon III's France honored the alliance with the Kingdom of Sardinia, initiating the Second Italian War of Independence. During the conflict, the Sardinian-French army achieved two important victories: the one at Magenta (June 4, 1859) and the very bloody one at Solferino (June 24, 1859). The defeated Austrian army retreated east of the Mincio River while in Paris, contrary to Cavour's hopes, Napoleon III began to consider the possibility of an armistice with Vienna. Important domestic and international political events were, in fact, dangerously ripening for France.

=== The situation in Europe ===
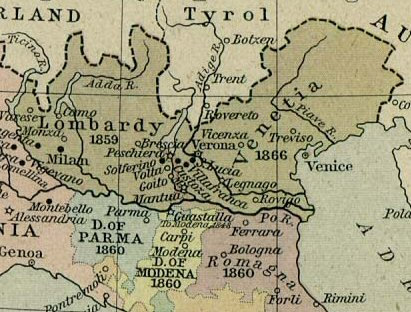
Lombardy-Venetia, a vassal kingdom of Austria, the main object of the Villafranca armistice.

The borders (in red) of the German Confederation. Prussia in blue, the Austrian Empire in yellow, and Lombardy-Venetia included in the Austrian Empire but outside the confederation's borders.

Almost isolated in his country by his decision to ally with the Kingdom of Sardinia and provoke a war in Italy, Napoleon III found himself in June 1859 facing the international consequences of his decision.

After the Battle of Magenta, Prussian Prince Regent Wilhelm moved closer to the positions of the party hostile to France, which defined Prussia as a party to a conflict involving Austria, a member and leader of the Germanic Confederation.

As the Sardinian-French army approached the Mincio, Prussia therefore decided on June 11, 1859, to mobilize six army corps to form an army to be deployed along the Rhine on the French border.

Later, however, on the 24th, Prussia formalized a proposal for mediation to Britain and Russia to examine with the two great powers the means by which peace could be restored in Europe. The latter initiative was an attempt by Prussian Foreign Minister Alexander von Schleinitz (1807-1885) to postpone the decision of a crisis with France.

In Britain the Prussian proposal for mediation was not received with particular interest: the new Liberal prime minister Henry John Temple, 3rd Viscount Palmerston, although closer to French positions than his predecessor Edward Smith-Stanley, 14th Earl of Derby was hampered by the Conservative followers in the government and by Queen Victoria, so the new executive differed little from the old one.

The proposal found a different reception in Saint Petersburg, where Ambassador Otto von Bismarck, the future chancellor, reported to Berlin of the favorable Russian disposition to joint mediation. At the same time Tsar Alexander II decided that he could go no further in favor of France. Russia was unable to seriously protect it from Prussia, since it was already engaged in the onerous problem of serfdom.

=== The situation in France ===
Faced with Prussian mobilization, British indifference, and a weak Russian demeanor, Napoleon III also faced an internal crisis.

Firmly opposed to the war in France were Foreign Minister Alexandre Walewski, moderate Catholic and conservative circles, Empress Eugénie, and War Minister Jacques Louis Randon.

Walewski communicated to Napoleon III the warning that came to him indirectly from St. Petersburg, that if the Sardinian-French army violated the territory of the German Confederation (in the Trentino region for example), even if only with Giuseppe Garibaldi's volunteers, Prussia would go to war with the other German states against France. The situation thus threatened to spiral out of Napoleon III's control.

He had, however, also to be wary of the Prussian hypothesis of mediation by Prussia, Britain and Russia, since peace would have appeared as imposed by Europe on France, which at the Congress of Paris (1856) had, instead, appeared to be the arbiter of the continent.

Resolved, therefore, to pursue the road to peace, Napoleon III, without waiting for the outcome of a listless British attempt to communicate France's intentions to Austria, sent General Émile Félix Fleury (1815-1884) on July 6, 1859, to the headquarters of the Austrian Emperor Franz Joseph with a proposal for an armistice.

== The truce (July 6–8, 1859) ==
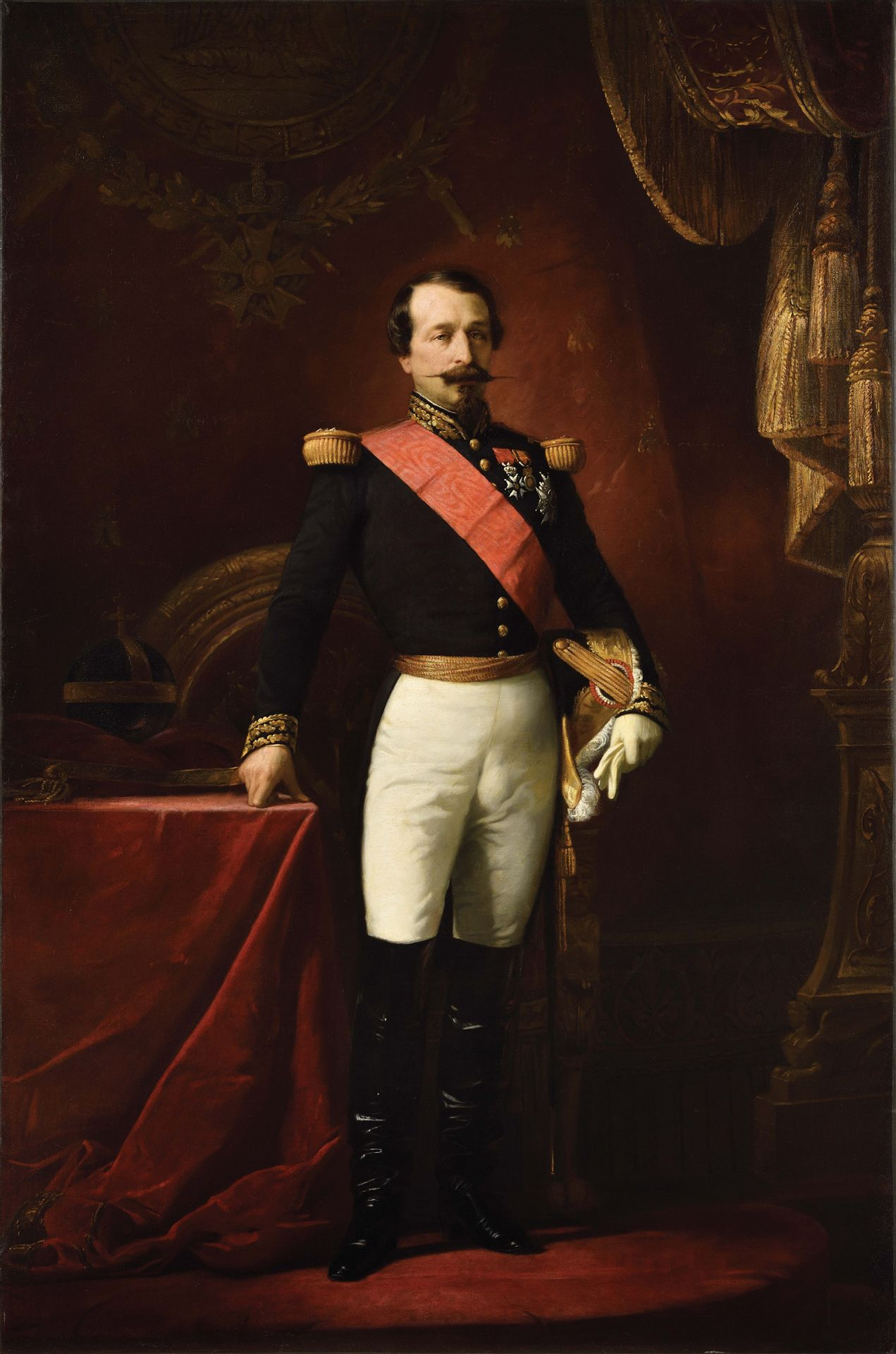
Napoleon III of France proposed an armistice to Franz Joseph.

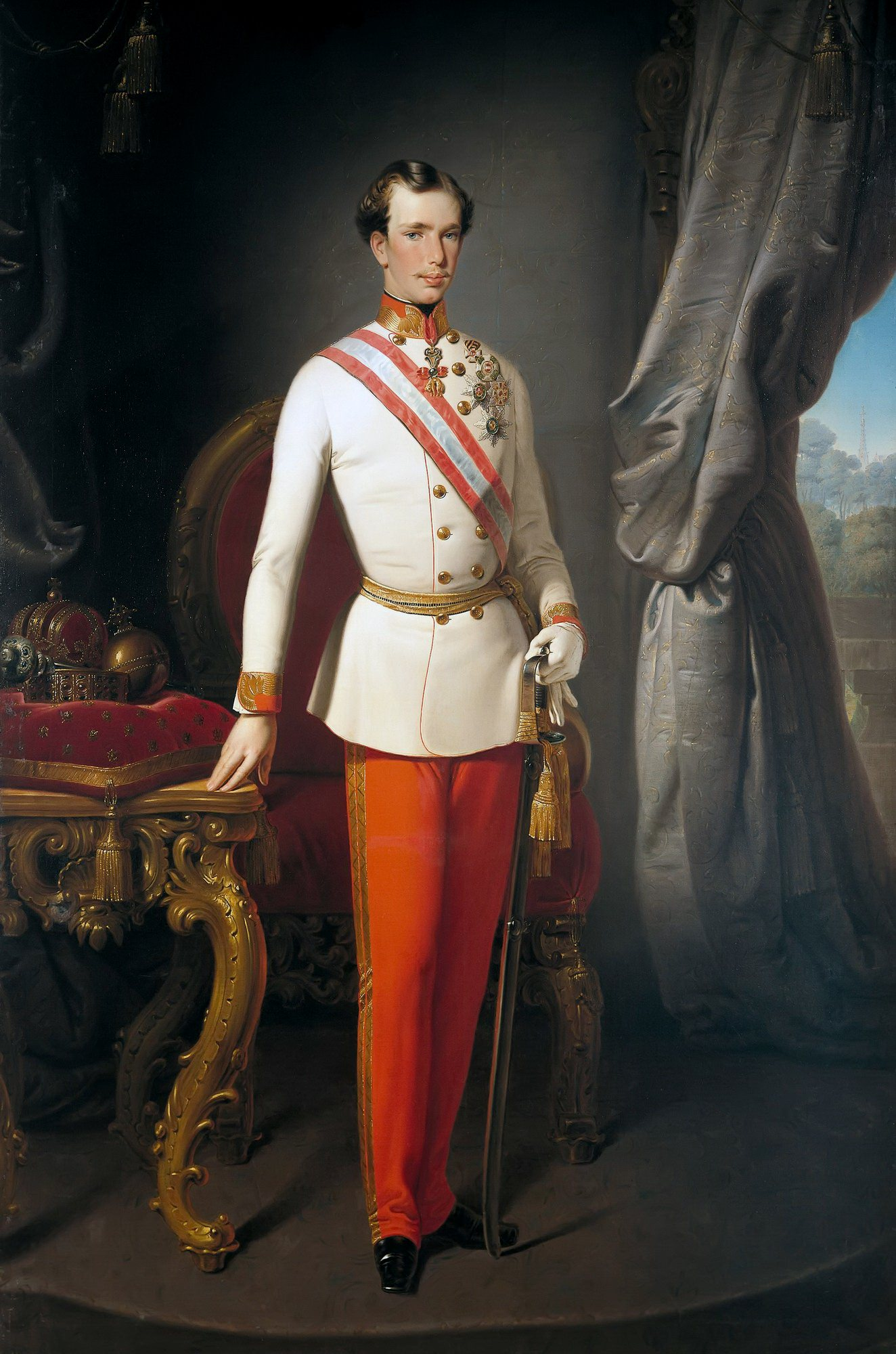
Franz Joseph portrayed in the year of Villafranca, 1859.

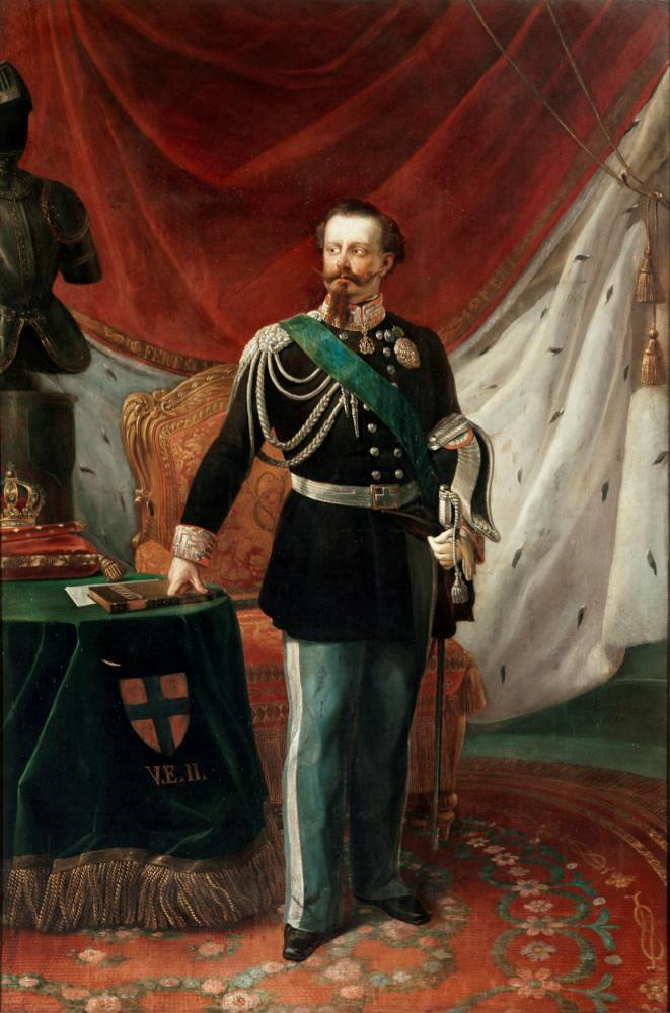
Victor Emmanuel II. As king of Sardinia he accepted, not without perplexity, the armistice conditions imposed by France and Austria.

Leaving at dusk on July 6, 1859, from Valeggio, the parliamentary flag carriage of Napoleon III's first squire, Fleury, encountered enemy outposts two miles from Verona. In this town the French carriage arrived at the Austrian headquarters, escorted by a squad of Habsburg cavalry, at nightfall. Napoleon III demanded a truce, which astonished the young Austrian monarch, who, though pleased, asked for time for a reply until the following day.

On the morning of that same July 6, meanwhile, Napoleon III and Prince Napoléon had a meeting with their ally Victor Emmanuel II. The latter, informed of the situation in Europe, was not surprised by the proposed French truce; pointing out, however, that if the armistice anticipated peace, it had to be in accordance with mutual commitments, namely, the Sardinian-French treaty of alliance. That treaty included, if the outcome of the war permitted, a commitment to force Austria to cede all of Lombardy-Venetia to the Kingdom of Sardinia.

On the 7th, Franz Joseph granted the truce, and on the morning of July 8, 1859, the commissioners in charge met in Villafranca, between the Allied (at Valeggio sul Mincio) and Austrian (at Verona) headquarters. The following were appointed: for France, General Jean-Baptiste Philibert Vaillant; for the Kingdom of Sardinia, General Enrico Morozzo Della Rocca; and for Austria, General Heinrich von Heß. The conference lasted three hours, during which the carnage of the Battle of Solferino was also discussed. At the end, it was decided that the truce would last until August 16.

== From truce to armistice (July 8–11) ==
On that same July 8, 1859, Victor Emmanuel II, fearing French initiatives to the detriment of the Kingdom of Sardinia, went to Napoleon III to reveal the proposals he planned to make to Austria. The French emperor replied that he intended to restore peace in Europe as soon as possible but also that the conditions of surrender for Austria would be harsh. If Vienna did not accept these conditions, the war would resume. In the meantime, he declared that he could prepare 200,000 men for the reopening of hostilities and asked for another 100,000 Italians. Victor Emmanuel, while not too happy about the truce, seemed to calm down.

Late in the afternoon of July 8, there was a further conversation between Napoleon III and Victor Emmanuel. The French emperor proposed to the king of Sardinia the start of peace negotiations, advancing the possibility of asking Austria for Lombardy alone. Victor Emmanuel agreed, departing decisively from the expectations of his prime minister Cavour, who, having received a rather calming telegram from the king, left for the theater of operations, arriving in Desenzano on the morning of July 10. That same day Cavour met both Prince Napoléon and Napoleon III to whose explanations of the armistice terms he protested strongly, but with Victor Emmanuel the conversation was probably even worse.

However, the French emperor was determined to negotiate peace, and since Franz Joseph would never agree to negotiate directly with the king of Sardinia, on July 10 he expressed his desire to negotiate personally and alone with Franz Joseph. In accordance with this desire, the necessary arrangements were made during the night, which determined, as the place and time of the meeting, Villafranca and 9 a.m. on July 11.

== The meeting between Napoleon III and Franz Joseph ==
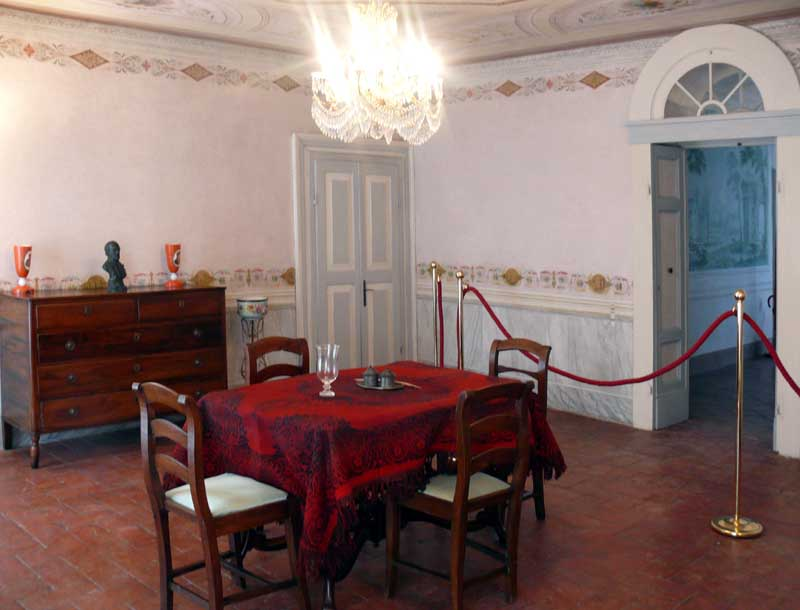
The hall on the main floor of the Bottagisio Palace, in Villafranca, where the conversation between the two emperors took place.

On the morning of July 11, 1859, Napoleon III was very obsequious toward Franz Joseph. Arriving first at the appointment, he moved to meet the Austrian emperor, who was joined along the way. Both on horseback, they traveled the remaining road to Villafranca.

The meeting took place at the Gandini Morelli Bugna palace, now Bottagisio, where Napoleon III surprised Franz Joseph by presenting to him as British conditions that he had actually suggested to the British himself, even giving the impression that Prussia also agreed. These proposals were: that Venetia would remain with Austria, which would cede Lombardy while retaining the fortresses of the Quadrilatero and Province of Mantua. Francis Joseph, faced with this initiative, disappointed at the lack of initial support from London and Berlin during the war, believed Napoleon III and was supportive.

The emperor of Austria also agreed, as monarch of Venetia, to be part of the Italian confederation proposed by Napoleon III, but refused any further concessions. According to the diaries of Prince Alexander of Hesse and by Rhine, the two monarchs also stipulated that Cavour should be removed from the Piedmontese government, as they both considered him an opponent of the peace that was about to be concluded.

The talks lasted an hour. Finally, the two emperors went out into the open air and reviewed the French and Austrian cavalry that had been convened. Returning the courtesy of the arrival, Franz Joseph accompanied Napoleon III for a stretch on the Valeggio road. Then, in a clear and visible sign of peace, the two sovereigns shook hands.

== Armistice negotiations and signatures ==
Half an hour later Napoleon III returned to Valeggio and immediately sent for Prince Napoléon to inform him of the outcome of the talks and send him to Verona to put pen to paper on the preliminaries of the Villafranca meeting. When Prince Napoléon arrived, the French emperor was in conversation with Victor Emmanuel II.

The two Bonapartes (Napoleon III and Prince Napoléon were cousins) insisted that the king of Sardinia reach a decision, and the French emperor after half an hour of discussion put on paper the following points to be proposed to Austria: Italian confederation under the honorary presidency of the pope, cession of Lombardy to France, which would in turn cede it to the Kingdom of Sardinia, Venetia to Austria but included in the Italian confederation, return of the pro-Austrian rulers to Modena and Tuscany in peaceful ways and with a commitment to grant a constitution, political reforms in the Papal States, and separate administration of the Papal Legations. With these basic proposals, Prince Napoleon left for Verona.

=== Cavour's resignation ===
These proposals were then communicated by Victor Emmanuel II to Cavour around 2 p.m. on July 11. The Prime Minister, in addition to seeing his hopes of liberating all of northern Italy from the Habsburgs thwarted, judged the entry of the Kingdom of Sardinia into the future confederation alongside Austria as catastrophic for national prestige. Once this serious disagreement emerged between him and the king, Cavour resigned as head of government in the afternoon.

=== The Austrian counterproposal ===
In Verona, meanwhile, Franz Joseph made various objections to Prince Napoléon and agreed to sign a draft agreement, the same evening of July 11, 1859, only after he had made it clear that the fortresses of the Quadrilatero and the Province of Mantua would remain with Austria, that for the return of the friendly sovereigns to Tuscany and Modena arms could be used, and that for the two states there would be no constitution and no administrative separation of the Papal Legations.

When his cousin returned from Verona, Napoleon III was satisfied with the counterproposal and affixed his signature. Not at all persuaded, however, appeared Victor Emmanuel II, who disputed the decision to abandon the two fortresses guarding Lombardy, without which the region was indefensible, and refused to sign. That night the king of Sardinia returned to Monzambano to his resigning prime minister, Cavour, who was waiting, "feverish and very agitated."

=== Cavour's reaction ===
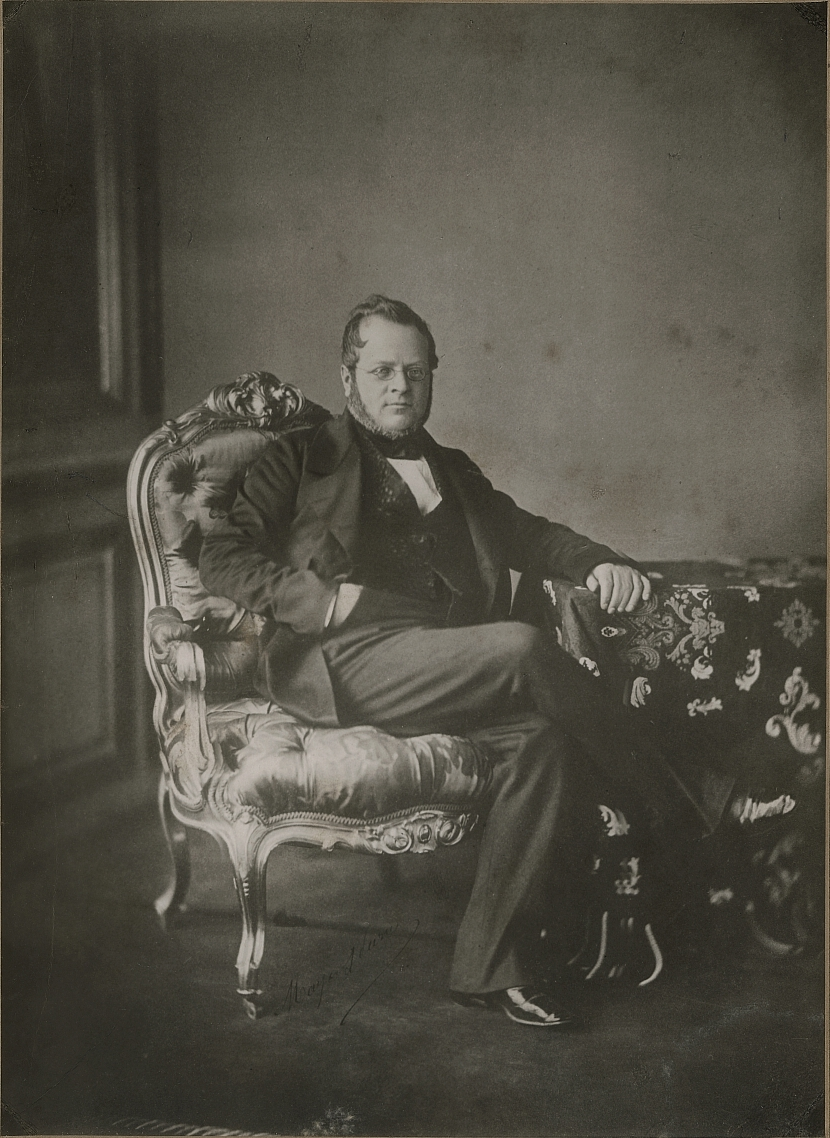
Cavour, in open conflict with Victor Emmanuel over agreements made with France, resigned.

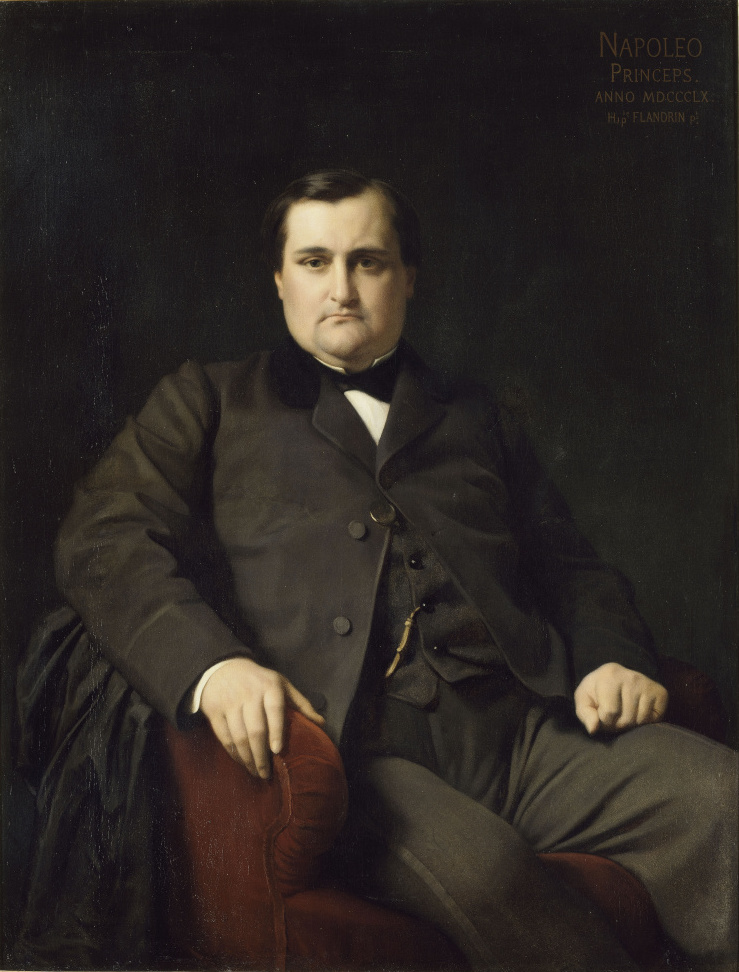
Prince Napoléon, a crucial figure in the negotiations between Napoleon III (of whom he was a cousin) and Franz Joseph.

Around midnight on July 11, 1859, Cavour was formally still in office, and Victor Emmanuel II and advisor Costantino Nigra made him aware of the Austrian counterproposal, which loomed an even worse picture for the Kingdom of Sardinia. Cavour lost his self-restraint by speaking of Napoleon III's betrayal and invoking the moral obligations undertaken by the French emperor to the Italians and to the honor of the House of Savoy. He called on Victor Emmanuel to leave the field to the French and Austrian forces who would resolve the Italian question on their own, and accused the king and Urbano Rattazzi of intrigues against him.

During the conversation, according to Isaac Artom, Cavour then changed the subject and, faced with what seemed to him a unique opportunity to free the Italians from oppression, urged the king not to bow his head in the face of the new pacts, not to be content with Lombardy if Italy continued to remain under the direct or indirect influence of Austria, to listen to the voice of his heart and even to retry the struggle with his own forces alone.

The discussion went on in very heated tones. Cavour disrespected the king on a personal level, so much so that Victor Emmanuel had to remind him that he was the sovereign, to which Cavour replied that the Italians instead knew him and that he was the real king, causing Victor Emmanuel at this point to abruptly interrupt the conversation with the phrase in Piedmontese, reported by Costantino Nigra: "Nigra, ca lo mena a durmì" ("Nigra, send him to sleep!").

Cavour left Monzambano the next morning and by the evening of July 12 was in Turin where the Council of Ministers, immediately convened, resolved the resignation of the entire government.

=== The signature of Victor Emmanuel II ===
Faced with the two options of gaining Lombardy (albeit without strongholds) or continuing the war alone, Victor Emmanuel II chose the former. On the morning of July 12 he too then signed the armistice, which at this point became valid for the entirety of the forces on the field. However, the king of Sardinia signed with the clause, probably suggested to him by Napoleon III, "for all that concerns me." In this way he did not commit himself regarding the course of events that already loomed irreversible outside his borders: the duchies of Parma and Modena and the Grand Duchy of Tuscany had in fact been dissolved and the United Provinces of Central Italy was preparing for union with Piedmont.

== The final terms of the armistice ==
The final terms of the armistice were as follows:

- The two sovereigns (Napoleon III and Franz Joseph) would favor the creation of an Italian confederation presided over by the pope.
- Austria would cede Lombardy to France with the exception of the fortresses of the Quadrilatero and the Province of Mantua. France would transfer Lombardy to the Kingdom of Sardinia.
- Venetia would be part of the constituted Italian confederation remaining a possession of Austria.
- The Grand Duke of Tuscany and the Duke of Modena would have returned to their states, granting a general amnesty.
- Napoleon III and Franz Joseph would ask the pope to introduce social and political reforms in the Papal States.

== Impracticality of the final conditions ==
For not respecting in spirit the alliance Napoleon III momentarily renounced territorial claims on Savoy and Nice, and demanded from the Kingdom of Sardinia only a small part of the war expenses incurred in the military campaign.

Taking advantage of the Austrian withdrawal from central Italy, Cavour had already taken all measures since May 1859 to designate men to be placed in charge of the liberated regions. In Tuscany he designated Carlo Bon Compagni di Mombello; in Bologna, Modena and Parma he brought in Massimo d'Azeglio, Luigi Carlo Farini and Diodato Pallieri. These immediately formed pro-Piedmontese provisional governments. After that, in the Papal Legations, Imola, Faenza, Forlì, Cesena, Rimini, Ferrara, Ravenna and other minor cities also became free.

This situation favored plebiscites for annexation to the Kingdom of Sardinia that were held in the Duchy of Modena between August 14 and 21 and in the Duchy of Parma on September 11 and 12, 1859. In both cases the results were in favor of annexation.

Subsequently, the Papal Legations, the duchies and Tuscany were united as the United Provinces of Central Italy," in which an army was mobilized that should have numbered about 25-30,000 men.

These developments and the resistance of the provisional governments made it impossible to realize the clause in the Villafranca armistice that provided for the restoration of the old institutions. It was also impossible to create a confederation of Italian states, nor was it feasible to implement the desired reforms in the Papal States. Despite this, the Villafranca Armistice was formalized with the Treaty of Zürich in November 1859.

The only condition met was the handover of Lombardy to the Kingdom of Sardinia. However, this event had enormous political weight: the cession of Lombardy marked the most serious defeat Austria had ever suffered on the Italian question, ending Austrian control of a region it had ruled since 1706.

== The aftermath and French-Piedmontese relations ==
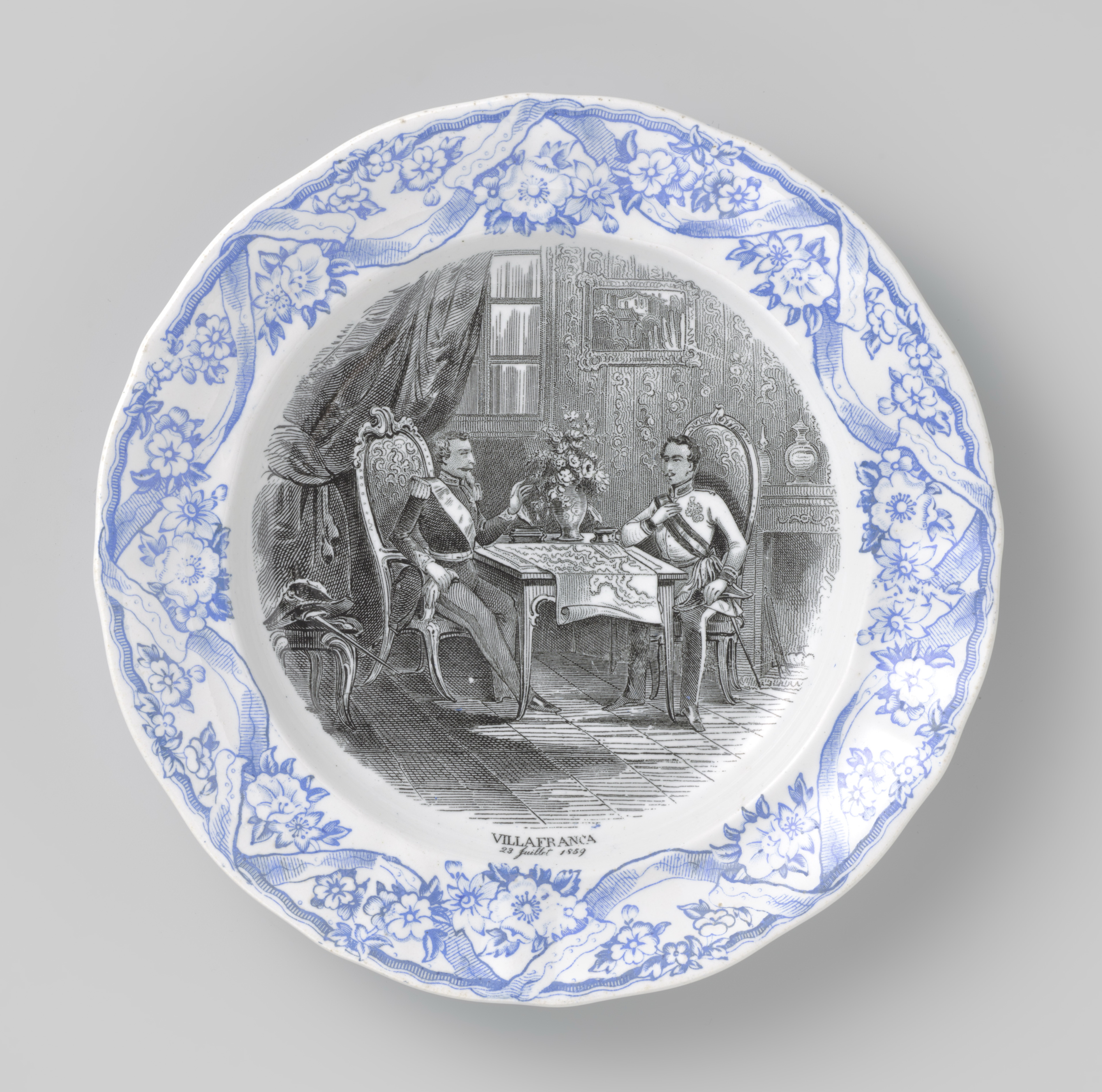
Commemorative plate (Rijksmuseum, Amsterdam)

In the aftermath of the Treaty of Zürich, France found itself in the ambiguous role of protective power of the Papal States and main ally of the Kingdom of Sardinia - an ambiguity that allowed Napoleon III to maintain a decisive influence over Italian affairs until the end of the Second Empire.

In the immediate aftermath, however, a stalemate was reached, as the provisional governments of central Italy refused to return power to the former rulers, nor did La Marmora's Piedmontese government have the courage to proclaim the annexations of the liberated territories. Thus, on December 22, 1859, Victor Emmanuel II resigned himself to recall Cavour.

The count, who returned to the presidency of the Council of Ministers on Jan. 21, 1860, was faced with a French proposal for a solution to the question of the liberated territories: annexation to Piedmont of the duchies of Parma and Modena, Savoy control of the pontifical Romagna, separate kingdom in Tuscany under the leadership of a member of the House of Savoy, and cession of Nice and Savoy to France. In case of rejection of the proposal, Piedmont would have had to face the situation alone in front of Austria, which did not have the final conditions of the armistice recognized.

The cession of Nice and Savoy was thus the price demanded by France for Piedmont to annex much of central Italy.

Compared to the agreements of the Sardinian-French alliance, this solution substituted for Piedmont the annexation of Veneto. Having effectively established the annexation of Parma, Modena and Romagna, Cavour, defying France, organized a plebiscite in Tuscany (March 11–12, 1860) with results that legitimized the annexation of the Grand Duchy to the Kingdom of Sardinia as well.

The French government reacted with great irritation, immediately urging the cession of Savoy and Nice, which took place with the signing of the Treaty of Turin on March 24, 1860. In exchange for these two provinces, therefore, the Kingdom of Sardinia acquired not only Lombardy but also what is now Emilia-Romagna and Tuscany. This new territorial arrangement would have prevented Austria from making direct military interventions in the remaining papal territories and the Kingdom of the Two Sicilies in support of the rulers, as its army would have had to cross regions now part of the Kingdom of Sardinia.

At this point Victor Emmanuel II and Cavour realized the great political advantage gained from the defeat of Austria and resumed in 1860 with Giuseppe Garibaldi the leadership in the process for the unification of Italy.

== See also ==
- Treaty of Zürich
- The Piedmontese campaign in central Italy, 1860
- Second Italian War of Independence
- Villafranca di Verona

== Bibliography ==
- Alfredo Panzini, Il 1859 da Plombières a Villafranca, Treves, Milano, 1909.
- Alan John Percival Taylor, The Struggle for Mastery in Europe 1848-1918, Oxford, Clarendon Press, 1954 (Ediz. Ital. L'Europa delle grandi potenze. Da Metternich a Lenin, Laterza, Bari, 1961).
- Ettore Anchieri (a cura di), La diplomazia contemporanea, raccolta di documenti diplomatici (1815-1956), Cedam, Padova 1959.
- Rosario Romeo, Vita di Cavour, Laterza, Bari, 2004 ISBN 88-420-7491-8.
- AA.VV. (Ottavio Bartié, Massimo de Leonardis, Anton Giulio de'Robertis, Gianluigi Rossi), Storia delle relazioni internazionali. Testi e documenti (1815-2003), Monduzzi, Bologna, 2004 ISBN 978-88-323-4106-5.
- Renato Eugenio Righi, Sulla via dell'unificazione italiana. La lega militare (1859-60), Tamari, Bologna, 1959.
