= Artom =

Artom is a Jewish-Italian surname. Notable people with the surname include:

- Benjamin Artom (1835–1879), Italian-born English rabbi
- Emilio Artom (1888–1952), Jewish Italian mathematician
- Isaac Artom (1829 –1900), Jewish Italian writer, diplomat, and politician

== See also ==
- Artem, Russian given name
