= Pier Dionigi Pinelli =

Italian politician (1804–1852)

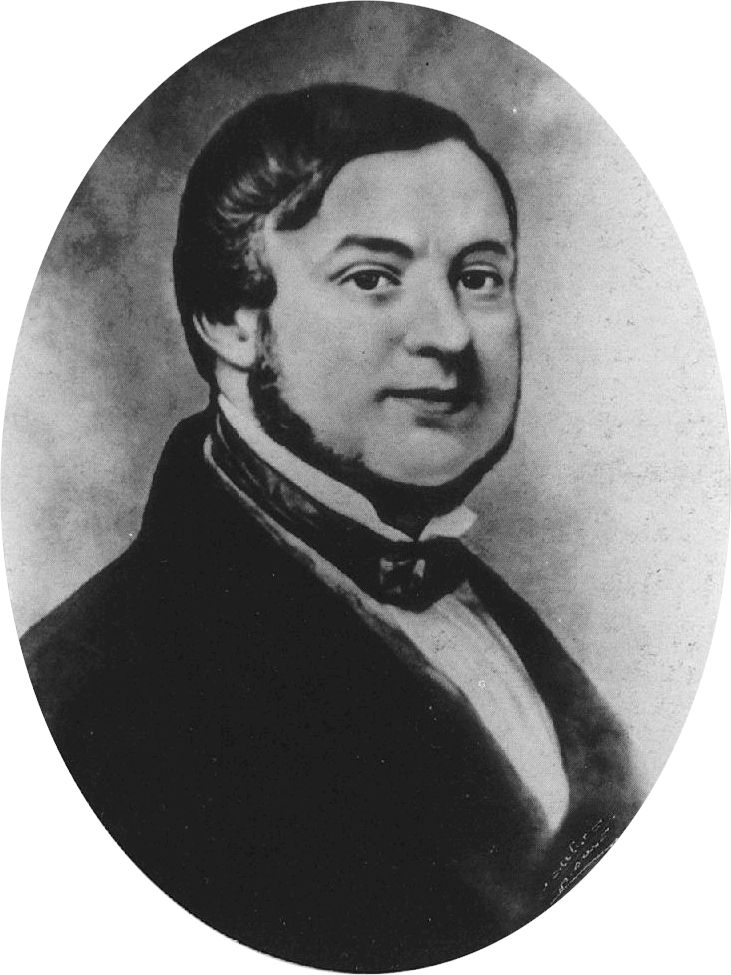
- Pinelli, c. 1850

President of the Chamber of Deputies
- In office 20 December 1849 – 22 April 1852
- Monarch: Victor Emmanuel II
- Preceded by: Lorenzo Pareto
- Succeeded by: Urbano Rattazzi
- Succeeded by: Filippo Galvagno

Minister of the interior of the Kingdom of Sardegna
- In office 15 August 1848 – 3 December 1848
- Monarch: Charles Albert of Sardinia
- Preceded by: Giacomo Plezza
- Succeeded by: Riccardo Sineo
- In office 27 March 1849 – 20 October 1849
- Monarch: Victor Emmanuel II
- Preceded by: Urbano Rattazzi

Personal details
- Born: 25 May 1804 Turin
- Died: 25 April 1852 (aged 47) Turin
- Party: Historical Left
- Education: University of Turin
- Profession: Lawyer

Pier Dionigi Pinelli (25 May 1804 – 22 April 1852) was an Italian politician.

== Biography ==
Born in Turin on 25 May 1804, Pinelli was the third child (and second son) of Lodovico Pinelli and Angela Carelli. A lawyer and agricultural scholar, Pinelli collaborated on the Annals of Jurisprudence and edited Il Carroccio, the organ of the Casale Monferrato agrarian association. In 1846, he published a project proposing a large Italian association for reclaiming uncultivated land throughout the peninsula.

After the revolution of 1848 and the granting of the Statuto Albertino by King Carlo Alberto in the Kingdom of Sardinia, Pinelli became involved in politics. Despite holding conservative ideas, he was elected as a deputy to the Subalpine Parliament. Appointed as Minister of the Interior on 15 August of that year in the government of Cesare Alfieri di Sostegno and in that of Claudio Gabriele de Launay on 27 March 1849, immediately after the Piedmontese defeat at Novara and the abdication of the king in favor of his son Victor Emmanuel II, Pinelli proved inflexible in the interior, taking an active part in the suppression of the Genoa riots that broke out in April. Later, as the government became highly unpopular because of its authoritarianism, Pinelli personally recommended his friend Vincenzo Gioberti as the president of the council to the king. However, political differences later caused Pinelli to distance himself from Gioberti. The king, instead, chose Massimo d'Azeglio, who, once in office, kept him in the Ministry of the Interior until 20 October 1849, when he forced him to resign in order to facilitate relations with the democratic wing of Parliament, replacing him with Filippo Galvagno. Nevertheless, Pinelli carried out other political and diplomatic activities, such as when, in 1850, he went to Rome to meet Pope Pius IX to seek an agreement on the issue of the Siccardi Laws, which had just come into force and abolished the privileges of the Piedmontese clergy.

From 20 December 1849 to 22 April 1852, he served as the president of the Chamber of Deputies and died during his term. He was succeeded as president by Urbano Rattazzi. Pinelli is buried in the Monumental Cemetery of Turin.
