= Non Expedit =

Policy of abstention from the polls in parliamentary elections

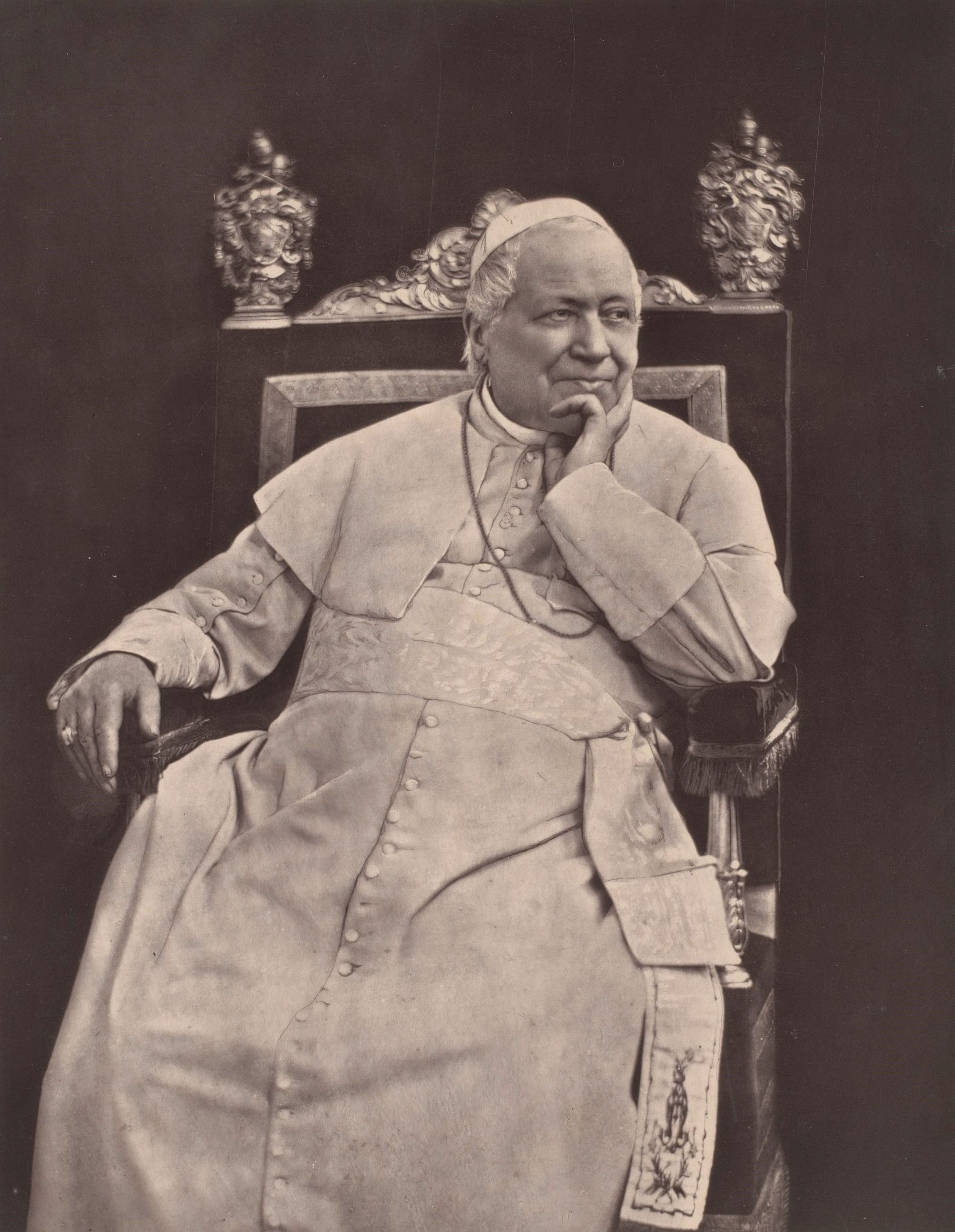
Pope Pius IX issued non expedit declarations on several occasions.

Non expedit (/nɔn ˈɛkspedit/; Latin for "it is not appropriate") was a provision of the Holy See declaring it inappropriate for Italian Catholics to participate in political elections in the Kingdom of Italy and, by extension, in Italian national political life.

The expression, which drew on Catholic opposition to the unification of Italy and capture of the Papal States, was first used by the Extraordinary Congregation in Charge of Ecclesiastical Affairs of the Catholic World during the papacy of Pope Pius IX on January 30, 1868. It was effectively revoked by Pope Benedict XV in 1919 to allow Catholics to join the Italian People's Party founded by Don Luigi Sturzo.

The declaration did not apply to local or administrative elections.

== History ==
The phrase, "it is not expedient," has long been used by the Roman Curia to indicate a negative reply for reasons of opportunity.

=== Origins ===
In 1861, the newly unified Kingdom of Italy held its first political elections. Although the Holy See neither officially imposed or discouraged abstention, Don Giacomo Margotti, director of the daily newspaper L'Armonia, publicly endorsed abstention on 7 January 1861 by signing his editorial, "Nè eletti, nè elettori" ("Be neither elected nor electors."). L'Armonia had a circulation of over 60,000, and Margotti thereby popularized the axiom among Italian Catholics.

The principle was criticized by political moderates, who accused Catholics of failing in their duty to society and to the newly unified Italy. Prior to the declaration of non expedit, there had been a few eminent representatives of Catholic interests in the Italian Parliament, such as Augusto Conti, Vito d'Ondes Reggio, and Cesare Cantù.

However, the electoral laws of Italy at the time limited the electorate to fewer than 700,000 people, and the government manipulated the elections, making the passage of anti-Catholic laws appear unpreventable. The principle also had the genuine support of many Catholics, who opposed parliamentary government and (particularly in the former states of Parma, Modena, Tuscany, and the former Kingdom of the Two Sicilies) remained supporters of the dispossessed Catholic princes. The principle also suspended inter-Catholic political conflicts between the Catholics of the former Kingdom of Sardinia and Austrian provinces, which division could have weakened Catholic political power.

=== Formalization ===
In the years following unification, various bodies of the Holy See made several official pronouncements in favor of abstention. In June and September 1864 and February and March 1865, the Apostolic Penitentiary declined requests for clarifications regarding the participation of Catholics in elections. On December 1, 1866, however, the dicastery broke with this practice to affirm that a Catholic could accept a seat in parliament "on condition of publicly declaring his intention never to approve laws contrary to the Church." This declaration gave rise to various interpretations and disagreements, leading to the first official intervention in January 1868. Over the following years, a series of clarifications and declarations were issued, culminating in a ban on participation in Italian political life in 1886:

- On January 30, 1868, in response to Piedmontese bishops inquiring whether it was lawful for Catholics to participate in political elections, the Extraordinary Congregation in Charge of Ecclesiastical Affairs of the Catholic World responded non expedit ("It is not appropriate.").
- On November 9, 1870, following the capture of Rome by the Royal Italian Army, the Apostolic Penitentiary reiterated the expression with respect to the upcoming political elections of December 5.
- On September 10, 1874, the Apostolic Penitentiary reiterated the principle of non expedit in a communication to Italian bishops, establishing a sanction for anyone who participated in the upcoming election.
- Between 1874 and 1878, Pope Pius IX affirmed the principle several times in speeches, allocutions, and briefs to Church officials. As a "prisoner in the Vatican," he sought to restore the temporal rule of the papacy and the independence of the Holy See.
- In July 1886, the Supreme Sacred Congregation of the Roman and Universal Inquisition expressed the principle fully as non expedit prohibitionem importat ("impropriety implies prohibition").

The most famous exposition of the principle came Pius IX's speech of 11 October 1874:

And since I have received a question from some Italian city about the permissibility of sitting in that chamber [Parliament], while I advise prayer, I respond to the question with just two observations. I say, first, that the choice is not free, because political passions face too many powerful obstacles. And even if it were free, there would remain an even greater obstacle to overcome: that of the oath that everyone is obliged to take without any restriction. This oath, note well, should be taken in Rome, here in the capital of Catholicism, here under the eyes of the Vicar of Jesus Christ. And one should swear to observe, protect, and uphold the laws of the State: that is, one must swear to sanction the plundering of the Church, the sacrileges committed, and anti-Catholic teaching...

=== Rapprochement and repeal ===
Efforts to withdraw the declaration within the Holy See began as early as 1882, during the papacy of Pope Leo XIII, when suffrage was extended to most Italian Catholics. Although considerations were made for abolishing its restrictions, no action was taken. On December 30, 1886, however, the Inquisition declared it to be a grave precept, a stance which would be repeated on several subsequent occasions through 1903.

In the twentieth century, the successive pontificates of Pius X and Benedict XV were marked by a phase of gradual rapprochement with the secular institutions of the Kingdom of Italy. In response to the electoral successes of the socialists, Catholics allied with moderate liberals, led by Giovanni Giolitti, in many local administrative elections.

In 1904, Pope Pius X modified the non expedit in the encyclical "Il fermo proposito", declaring ahead of the upcoming general elections that bishops could request a suspension of the rule when there was question of preventing the election of a "subversive" candidate and invite Catholics to hold themselves in readiness to go to the polls. The decision came following a hearing granted to the lawyer Paolo Bonomi of Bergamo, appealing the principle.

In the 1913 general election, the informal clerical-moderate alliance at the local level was made national in the form of the Gentiloni Pact. The alliance triumphed in the general elections, with Catholics voting for liberals who had endorsed certain doctrinal programs, including freedom of education and opposition to divorce, and the liberals voting for some Catholic candidates.

In 1919, Don Luigi Sturzo and other Catholics formed the Italian People's Party with the permission of Pope Benedict XV. The foundation of the party was taken as a tacit and reluctant reversal of the principle of non expedit, which was made formal later the same year. The party won 20.6 percent of the vote in the 1919 Italian general election, participating in every government between 1919 and 1922.

== In popular culture ==
In the 2016 television series The Young Pope, the fictional titular character Pope Pius XIII (Jude Law) threatens to restore the non expedit in a meeting with the Italian prime minister, depriving his government of legitimacy.
