= Giacomo Plezza =

Italian politician

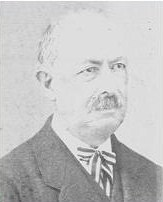

Minister of the Interior of the Kingdom of Sardinia
- In office 27 July 1848 – 10 August 1848
- Monarch: Charles Albert of Savoy
- Preceded by: Lorenzo Pareto
- Succeeded by: Pier Dionigi Pinelli

Senator of the Kingdom of Sardinia and the Kingdom of Italy.
- In office 22 May 1848 – 4 September 1893

Personal details
- Born: 26 December 1806; Cergnago
- Died: 4 September 1893 (aged 86); Arona

Giacomo Plezza (1806–1893) was an Italian politician.

== Biography ==
Appointed senator in 1848 by King Charles Albert, he was vice-president of the divisional council of Novara, president of the provincial council of Lomellina, mayor of Cergnago, and envoy extraordinary and minister plenipotentiary in the Kingdom of the Two Sicilies (December 26, 1848 – May 16, 1849).

He was the architect of important irrigation works in Lomellina; a canal irrigating vast areas in the provinces of Novara and Pavia bears his name.
