= Margotti =

Margotti is an Italian surname. Notable people with the surname include:

- Carlo Margotti (1891–1951), Italian prelate of the Catholic Church
- Giacomo Margotti (1823–1887), Italian Roman Catholic priest and journalist
- Stefano Margotti (1900–?), Italian sports shooter
