= Carlo Cadorna =

Italian politician (1809–1891)

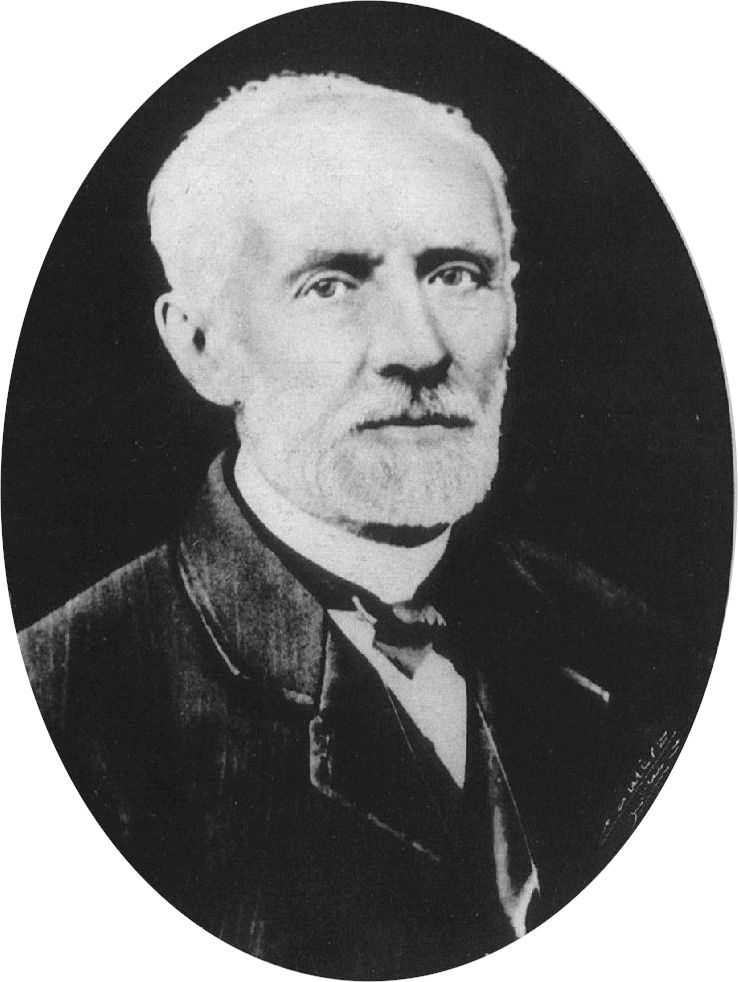

6th President of the Italian Chamber of Deputies
- In office 7 January 1857 – 16 July 1857
- Preceded by: Carlo Bon Compagni di Mombello
- Succeeded by: Carlo Bon Compagni di Mombello

Personal details
- Born: 8 December 1809 Pallanza, Italy
- Died: 2 December 1891 (aged 81) Rome, Italy
- Occupation: Politician

Carlo Cadorna (8 December 1809 in Pallanza – 2 December 1891 in Rome) was an Italian politician and the elder brother of General Raffaele Cadorna.

He graduated in law in 1830 at the University of Turin. In 1840, he was elected to the Chamber of Deputies in the constituency of Pallanza. He was the Minister of Education during the government headed by Vincenzo Gioberti.

He was rapporteur of the law of secularisation of 29 May 1855 and spoke to a principle of separation of church and state, and that the Church would be responsible only spiritual power on "thoughts, aspirations, beliefs", while the assets of the Church must be under the jurisdiction of the state.

In 1857 Cadorna was elected President of the Chamber of Deputies of the Kingdom of Sardinia, and in 1858 became a senator and appointed Minister of Education in the government led by Camillo Benso, Count of Cavour (1858-1859).

In 1864 he was the prefect of Turin, and in 1868 Minister of the Interior of the Legislature I of Italy.

He was the ambassador to the United Kingdom from 1869 to 1875.

== Awards ==
- Order of Saints Maurice and Lazarus
- Order of the Crown of Italy
