= Luigi Carlo Farini =

Italian physician, statesman and historian

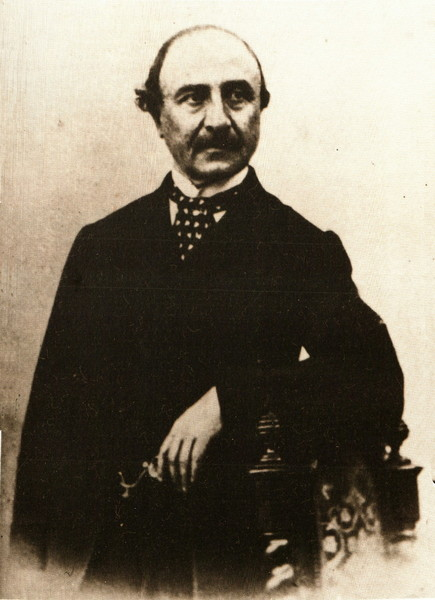

4th Prime Minister of Italy
- In office 8 December 1862 – 24 March 1863
- Monarch: Victor Emmanuel II
- Preceded by: Urbano Rattazzi
- Succeeded by: Marco Minghetti

Dictator of Emilia
- In office 20 July 1859 – 13 March 1860
- Monarch: Victor Emmanuel II
- Preceded by: Office established
- Succeeded by: Office abolished

Personal details
- Born: 22 October 1812 Russi, Kingdom of Italy
- Died: 1 August 1866 (aged 53) Quarto dei Mille near Genoa, Kingdom of Italy
- Party: Historical Right

Luigi Carlo Farini (22 October 1812 – 1 August 1866) was an Italian medical doctor, statesman and historian.

== Biography ==
Farini was born at Russi, in what is now the province of Ravenna.

After completing a university course at Bologna, which he interrupted to take part in the revolution of 1831, he practised as a physician at Russi and at Ravenna. He acquired a considerable reputation, but in 1843 his political opinions brought him under the suspicion of the police and caused his expulsion from the Papal States. He resided successively in Florence and Paris, and travelled about Europe as private physician to Prince Jérôme Bonaparte, but when Pius IX was elected to the Holy See and began his reign with apparently Liberal and nationalist tendencies, Farini returned to Italy and was appointed secretary-general to G Recchi, the minister of the interior (March 1848).

But he held office for little more than a month, since like all the other Italian Liberals he disapproved of the Pius IX's change of front in refusing to allow his troops to fight against Austria, and resigned with the rest of the ministry on 29 April. Pius, wishing to counteract the effect of this policy, sent Farini to Charles Albert, king of Sardinia, to hand over the command of the papal contingent to him. Elected member of parliament for Faenza, he was again appointed secretary to the ministry of the interior in the Mamiani cabinet, and later director-general of the public health department.

He resigned office on the proclamation of the republic after the flight of the pope to Gaeta in 1849, resumed it for a while when Pius returned to Rome with the protection of French arms, but when a reactionary and priestly policy was instituted, he went into exile and took up his residence at Turin. There he became convinced that it was only through the House of Savoy that Italy could be liberated, and he expounded his views in Cavour's paper Il Risorgimento, in La Frusta and Il Piemonte, of which latter he was at one time editor. He also wrote his chief historical work, Lo Stato Romano dal 1815 al 1850, in four volumes (Turin, 1850).

In 1851 he was appointed minister of public instruction in the D'Azeglio cabinet, an office which he held till May 1852. As a member of the Sardinian parliament and as a journalist Farini was one of the staunchest supporters of Cavour, and strongly favoured the proposal that Piedmont should participate in the Crimean War, if indeed he was not actually the first to suggest that policy. In 1856 and 1857 he published two letters to British liberal statesman William Ewart Gladstone on Italian affairs, which created a sensation, while he continued to propagate his views in the Italian press.

When on the outbreak of the war of 1859 Francis V, duke of Modena, was expelled and a provisional government set up, Farini was sent as Piedmontese commissioner to that city; but, although recalled after the peace of Villafranca which ended the Second Italian War of Independence, he was determined on the annexation of central Italy to Sardinia/Piedmont and remained behind, becoming a Modenese citizen and dictator of the state. He negotiated an alliance with Parma, Romagna and Tuscany, when other provisional governments had been established, and entrusted the task of organizing an army for this central Italian league to General Fanti.

Annexation to Piedmont having been voted by plebiscite and the opposition of Napoleon III having been overcome, Farini returned to Turin, where the king conferred on him the order of the Annunziata and Cavour appointed him minister of the interior (June 1860), and subsequently viceroy of Naples; but he soon resigned because of ill-health. Cavour died in 1861, and the following year, Farini succeeded Rattazzi as premier, in which office he endeavoured to carry out Cavour's policy. Overexertion, however, brought on softening of the brain, which compelled him to resign office on 24 March 1863, and ultimately resulted in his death in poverty at Quarto dei Mille in Genoa. He was buried at Turin, but in 1878 his remains were removed to his native village of Russi.

His son Domenico Farini also had a distinguished political career and was President of the Chamber of Deputies and President of the Senate three times.

== See also ==
- Farini government

== Sources ==
Political offices
Preceded by Urbano Rattazzi	Prime Minister of Italy; 1862–1863	Succeeded by Marco Minghetti
