= List of ministers of the interior of the Kingdom of Sardinia =

List of ministers of the interior for the Kingdom Sardegna from the Balbo Government until the third Cavour Government (1848-1861)

== List ==
Image	Minister	Mandate	Government	Monarch	Image
	Vincenzo Ricci	16 March - 5 July 1848	Balbo Government	Carlo Alberto	
	Giacomo Plezza	27 July - 10 August 1848	Casati Government	Carlo Alberto	
	Pier Dionigi Pinelli	15 August - 11 October 1848	Alfieri Government	Carlo Alberto	
	Pier Dionigi Pinelli	11 October - 3 December 1848	Perrone Government	Carlo Alberto	
	Riccardo Sineo	6 December 1848 - 17 February 1849	Gioberti Government	Carlo Alberto	
	Urbano Rattazzi	17–21 February 1849	Gioberti Government	Carlo Alberto	
	Urbano Rattazzi	24 February - 23 March 1849	Chiodo Government	Carlo Alberto	
	Pier Dionigi Pinelli (2)	27 March - 6 May 1849	De Launay Government	Victor Emmanuel II	
	Pier Dionigi Pinelli (2)	7 May - 20 October 1849	I D’Azeglio Government	Victor Emmanuel II	
	Filippo Galvagno	21 October 1849 - 26 February 1852	I D’Azeglio Government	Victor Emmanuel II	
	Alessandro Pernati di Momo	27 February - 21 May 1852	I D’Azeglio Government	Victor Emmanuel II	
	Alessandro Pernati di Momo	22 May - 22 October 1852	II D’Azeglio Government	Victor Emmanuel II	
	Gustavo Ponza di San Martino	4 November 1852 - 6 March 1854	I Cavour Government	Victor Emmanuel II	
	Urbano Rattazzi (2)	7 March 1854 - 27 April 1855	I Cavour Government	Victor Emmanuel II	
	Urbano Rattazzi (2)	4 May 1855 - 15 January 1858	II Cavour Government	Victor Emmanuel II	
	Camillo Benso, conte di Cavour	15 January 1858 - 19 July 1859	II Cavour Government	Victor Emmanuel II	
	Urbano Rattazzi (3)	19 July 1859 - 21 January 1860	I La Marmora	Victor Emmanuel II	
	Camillo Benso, conte di Cavour (2)	21 January - 24 March 1860	III Cavour Government	Victor Emmanuel II	
	Luigi Carlo Farini	24 March - 31 December 1860	III Cavour Government	Victor Emmanuel II	
	Marco Minghetti	31 December 1860 - 31 March 1861	III Cavour Government	Victor Emmanuel II	

== See also ==
Minister of the Interior (Italy)
