= Isaac Artom =

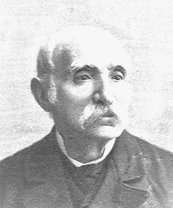
Isaac Artom

Isaac Artom (31 December 1829 – 24 January 1900) was a Jewish Italian diplomat and politician.

== Life ==
Artom was born on 31 December 1829, in Asti, Kingdom of Sardinia. His father, Raffaele, was an educator. The Artom family had a number of members who achieved distinctions in various fields, including physicist Alessandro Artom, Rabbi Benjamin Artom, diplomat and historian Ernest Artom, composer Camillo Artom, attorney Eugenio Artom, biologist Cesare Artom, and scholar Elia Samuele Artom.

Artom was ready for the university when he was sixteen, but as Piedmont higher schools excluded Jews at the time, he went to Pisa in 1846, to study law at the University of Pisa. When the Revolution of 1848 broke out, he joined the students' battalion under Professor Giuseppe Montanelli (despite his frail constitution) and participated in the Battle of Curtatone and Montanara. He resumed his law studies after the war, and graduated from the University of Turin in 1853.

From 1850 to 1857, Artom wrote articles for the Opinione, that supported Cavour's policies. In 1858, he became Cavour's personal secretary. The clerical organ L'Armonia attacked him for being a Jew, although Cavour defended him. He played an important part in negotiations with Austria in 1861. In 1862, following Cavour's death, he became head of the Italian Legation in Paris. In 1867, he became the Italian ambassador to Copenhagen, the first Jew to hold that position in a modern state. Following the Unification of Italy, he served as under-secretary of state in the Ministry of Foreign Affairs from 1870 to 1876, holding that office through various personnel changes in the ministry. He became the first Jew to be appointed a member of the Italian Senate in 1877. He also represented Italy during peace negotiations with Austria in 1866, and was sent on a diplomatic mission to Vienna upon the outbreak of the Franco-Prussian War. He was ambassador at Karlsruhe, vice-president of the Provincial Council of Alessandria, and Provincial Councilor of Alessandria.

Artom was a writer of both prose and poetry. He wrote, among other things, an ode and a volume commemorating the death of King Victor Emmanuel II, a brief history of the Italian Ministry of Foreign Affairs, and a translation of Rudolf von Gneist's Der Rechtsstaat. His most ambitious work was a biography of his former friend and chief Cavour, which he wrote with Alberto Blanc. It was published in Paris in 1862 under the title L'Œuvre Parlementaire du Comte de Cavour. In the Italian Senate, he prepared two reports, one on the Italian treaty with Zanzibar in 1886, and one on certain commercial and maritime negotiations with France, Spain, and Switzerland in 1888.

Artom was unmarried. He was a Grand Officer and Grand Cordon of the Order of Saints Maurice and Lazarus, a Commander of the Order of the Crown of Italy, and a Knight of the Order of the Legion of Honour. He became a member of the Italian Geographic Society in 1868 and of the Council for Diplomatic Disputes in 1890.

Artom died in Rome on 24 January 1900, aged 60. He was buried in Asti.
