= Alessandro Pernati di Momo =

Italian politician

Alessandro Pernati di Momo (May 2, 1808 – July 27, 1894) was an Italian politician.

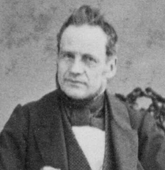

== Life ==
Alessandro Pernati di Momo was born on 2 May 1808 in Novara to Damiano Pernati di Momo and Teresa Longoni. He practiced law in Turin and was appointed Minister of the Interior for the Kingdom of Sardegna in 1852. He was also President of the council on healthcare and part of the Turin city council.

In 1861 he became a senator.

He died on 27 July 1894 in Turin.
