= Guglielmo Audisio =

Italian Catholic priest and writer (1802–1882)

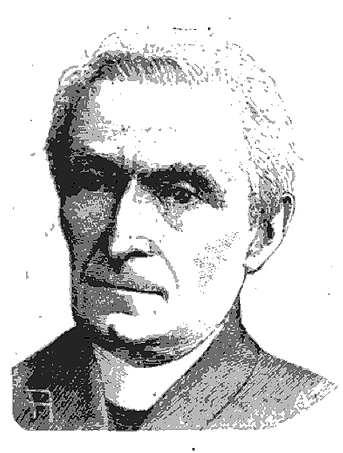
Guglielmo Audisio

Guglielmo Audisio (1802 at Bra, Piedmont, Italy – 27 September 1882 in Rome) was an Italian Catholic priest and writer.

== Life ==
Guglielmo Audisio was born January 27, 1802, and graduated with degrees in philosophy and theology from the University of Turin. After teaching for four years in the seminary of Bra, in 1837 he was appointed by King Carlo Alberto, Dean of the Ecclesiastical Academy of Superga, where he taught sacred eloquence, moral theology, canon law and institutions of Roman law. He was expelled from this office because he was opposed to the Piedmontese Government. Audisio was a fervent upholder of papal and Catholic rights against the political liberalism of Piedmont.

In 1848, along with Giacomo Margotti, he founded the newspaper, Armonia ("Harmony") in Turin. It was for this reason that he fell a victim to the anti-clerical influence which had deprived him of his post at Superga.

He then went to Rome, where Pope Pius IX appointed him professor at the Roman University, where he taught the law of nature and of nations. He was also appointed Canon of the Vatican Basilica. In Rome Audisio joined the liberal reformist Italian ecclesiastics, such as Francesco Liverani, and tried to reconcile the new political and cultural needs of his time with Catholic tradition. He urged Catholics to exercise their right and duty against political revolutionaries and Mazzini, rejecting all forms of abstention.

At the time of the First Vatican Council he was suspected of Gallicanism, to the grief of his patron Pius IX, and his work on political and religious society in the nineteenth century was condemned by the Church. Audisio submitted to the condemnation of his book, but he warmly protested against the accusation of heterodoxy and disobedience.

== Works ==
In 1839, in Turin, he published a manual of sacred eloquence, his most noted work, which was issued in eight Italian and a French edition.

He also devoted himself to historical studies, especially relating to the history of the papacy.

The works of Audisio include:

- Lezioni di Eloquenza Sacra (several editions);
- Juris Naturae et Gentium Publici Fundamenta (Rome, 1852)
- Idea storica della diplomazia ecclesiastica (Rome, 1864)
- Storia religiosa e civile dei papi (5 vols., Rome, 1860)
- Sistema politico e religioso di Federico II e di Pietro della Vigna (1866)
- Della società politica e religiosa rispetto al secolo XIX (Florence, 1876; condemned by decree of the Holy Office, April 1877)
- Vita di Pio IX

== Sources ==
- Nuova Encyclopedia Italiana (Suppl., I, 1889)
- Voce della Verita (Rome, 29 September 1882)
