= Riccardo Sineo =

Italian politician (1805–1876)

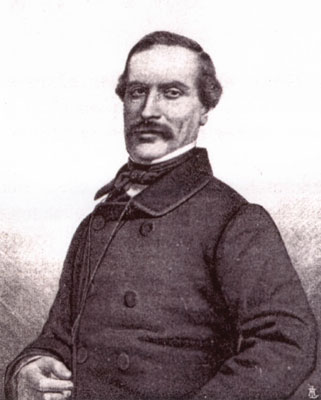

Minister of the Interior of the Kingdom of Sardinia
- In office 16 December 1848 – 17 February 1849
- Monarch: Victor Emmanuel II
- Preceded by: Pier Dionigi Pinelli
- Succeeded by: Urbano Rattazzi

Minister of grace and justice and ecclesiastical affairs of the Kingdom of Sardinia.
- In office 17 February 1849 – 27 March 1849
- Preceded by: Urbano Rattazzi
- Succeeded by: Cesare Cristiani di Ravarano

Personal details
- Born: 30 April 1805 Sale
- Died: 18 October 1876 (aged 71) Turin
- Education: University of Turin

Riccardo Sineo (Sale, April 30, 1805 - Turin, October 18, 1876) was an Italian politician.

== Early life ==
A native of Sale, in the province of Alessandria, he moved to Turin at a very young age to attend the law faculty of the university of Turin It was during this period that young Richard, of patriotic ideals, took an active part in the Carbonari uprisings that broke out in Piedmont in 1821, which forced the regent Charles Albert of Savoy to grant the Spanish constitution. After the failure of the riots and the repression implemented by the new king Charles Felix of Savoy, Sineo graduated late from the academic calendar, as the University of Turin was closed for a year by royal order. After successfully practicing law with the lawyer Villanis, whose daughter Giuseppina he would marry, in 1830 he was elected decurion, that is, member of the Turin city council.

== Career ==
It was at his suggestion, on February 5, 1848, that at the decurionate session, the Turin town hall officially asked the government for the adoption of a Constitution and the establishment of the Civic Guard. After the granting of the Statuto Albertino, Sineo was part of a commission, along with other exponents of Piedmontese liberalism, such as Balbo and Cavour, with the task of drafting the new electoral law to be brought to the new constitutional framework. The electoral law, approved on March 17, was census-based, that is, it granted the right to vote to adult male voters who had a certain census: thus, out of a population of 5 million, about 80,000 citizens were admitted to the electoral rolls. His ardent patriotism was also manifested when, on the news of the Five Days of Milan, Sineo harangued the crowd against Austria from Piazza Castello.

Elected deputy in the Saluzzo constituency, he brought the new liberal demands to the Camera dei deputati, siding with the more democratic and radical wing headed by Vincenzo Gioberti. After the fall of the ministry headed by the generate Ettore Perrone di San Martino, on December 16, 1848, Sineo was called to join the democratic ministry chaired by Gioberti as holder of the Interior. However, when the President of the Council of Ministers planned a Piedmontese armed intervention in Tuscany to restore the Lorraine dynasty, the Minister of the Interior with all his colleges of government disavowed Gioberti's action, prompting King Charles Albert to replace him, on March 21, 1849, with General Agostino Chiodo, in whose executive Sineo became Minister of Justice.

== Later life ==
After the defeat of Novara, he returned as a simple deputy, continuing to sit in the House in the following legislatures, during which he opposed, from the benches of the radical Left, Cavour's policies, especially opposing the expedition to Crimea in 1855 and the cession of Nice and Savoie to France in 1860. Even after the birth of the Kingdom of Italy, Sineo was re-elected to Parliament, always militating on the Left, voting, along with the entire Piedmontese parliamentary representation, against the September Convention of 1864, which moved the capital from Turin to Florence. Finally, on November 6, 1873, he was appointed senator by King Victor Emmanuel II of Savoy. He died in Turin on October 18, 1876, at the age of 71. He is buried in the Monumental Cemetery of Turin.

== Personal life ==
His son Emilio was minister of Posts and Telegraphs from 1896 to 1898. He was a Mason, and was a member of the lodge "Dante Alighieri" of Turin.
