= Giovanni Filippo Galvagno =

Italian lawyer and politician

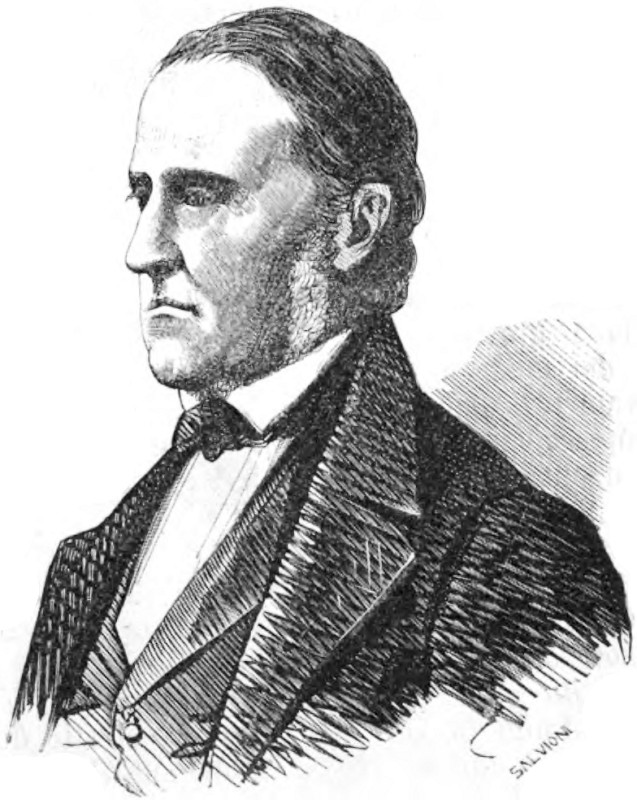
- Giovanni Filippo Galvagno

Minister of the Interior of the Kingdom of Sardinia
- In office 21 October 1849 – 26 February 1852
- Monarch: Victor Emmanuel II of Savoy
- Preceded by: Pier Dionigi Pinelli
- Succeeded by: Alessandro Pernati of Momo

Minister of Agriculture and Trade of the Kingdom of Sardinia
- In office 27 March 1849 – 6 May 1849
- First Minister: Claudio Gabriele de Launay
- Preceded by: Domenico Buffa
- In office 7 May 1849 – 20 October 1849
- Succeeded by: Antonio Mathieu
- In office 5 August 1850 – 11 October 1850
- Preceded by: Pietro De Rossi Di Santarosa
- Succeeded by: Camillo Benso, Count of Cavour

Minister of Public Works of the Kingdom of Sardinia
- In office 27 March 1849 – 6 May 1849
- First Minister: Claudio Gabriele de Launay
- Preceded by: Sebastiano Tecchio
- In office 7 May 1849 – 20 October 1849
- First Minister: Massimo d'Azeglio
- Succeeded by: Pietro De Rossi Di Santarosa

Minister of Grace and Justice and Ecclesiastical Affairs of the Kingdom of Sardinia
- In office 4 February 1851 – 6 July 1851
- Preceded by: Giuseppe Siccardi
- Succeeded by: Giovanni de Foresta
- In office 27 February 1852 – 16 May 1852
- Preceded by: Giovanni de Foresta
- Succeeded by: Carlo Bon Compagni of Mombello

Senator of the Kingdom of Italy
- In office 29 February 1860 – 27 March 1874

Deputy of the Kingdom of Sardinia

Personal details
- Born: 22 August 1801 Turin
- Died: 27 March 1874 (aged 72) Turin, Kingdom of Italy
- Profession: magistrate

Giovanni Filippo Galvagno (22 August 1801 – 27 March 1874) was an Italian lawyer and politician. He served in the Chamber of Deputies and Senate of the Kingdom of Sardinia. He was mayor of Turin under the Kingdom of Italy.

== Biography ==
He was a lawyer at the Magistrate of Appeals of Piedmont and patrimonial lawyer to the king.

He was a deputy to the parliament of the Kingdom of Sardinia in five terms, between 1848 and 1857. In 1849 he was appointed Minister of Public Works by Victor Emmanuel II, and later also served as Minister of the Interior (from 1849 to 1852), agriculture and justice. In 1860 he became a senator.

A town councilor of Turin for more than twenty years (from 1848 to his death), he was also its mayor from 1866 to 1869. He found himself administering the city at a difficult time: the capital of Italy had recently been transferred to Florence, and there was fear of a serious economic crisis. Upon his appointment, he received from his predecessor, Marquis Emanuele Luserna di Rorà, a precise mandate: "Turin shall become the Manchester of Italy", that is, the capital of industrialization. Galvagno strove to achieve this goal by promoting the construction of canals for energy production, although he had to fall back for lack of funds on a less ambitious project than the one envisioned by Luserna di Rorà, the Ceronda canal.

He also held the position of president of the Turin Philharmonic Academy.

He died in Turin in 1874 and was buried in the Fedio dei decurioni torinesi.

Preceded by Emanuele Luserna di Rorà	Mayor of Turin; 1866–1869	Succeeded by Cesare Valperga di Masino
