= Urbano Rattazzi =

Italian politician and statesman (1808–1873)

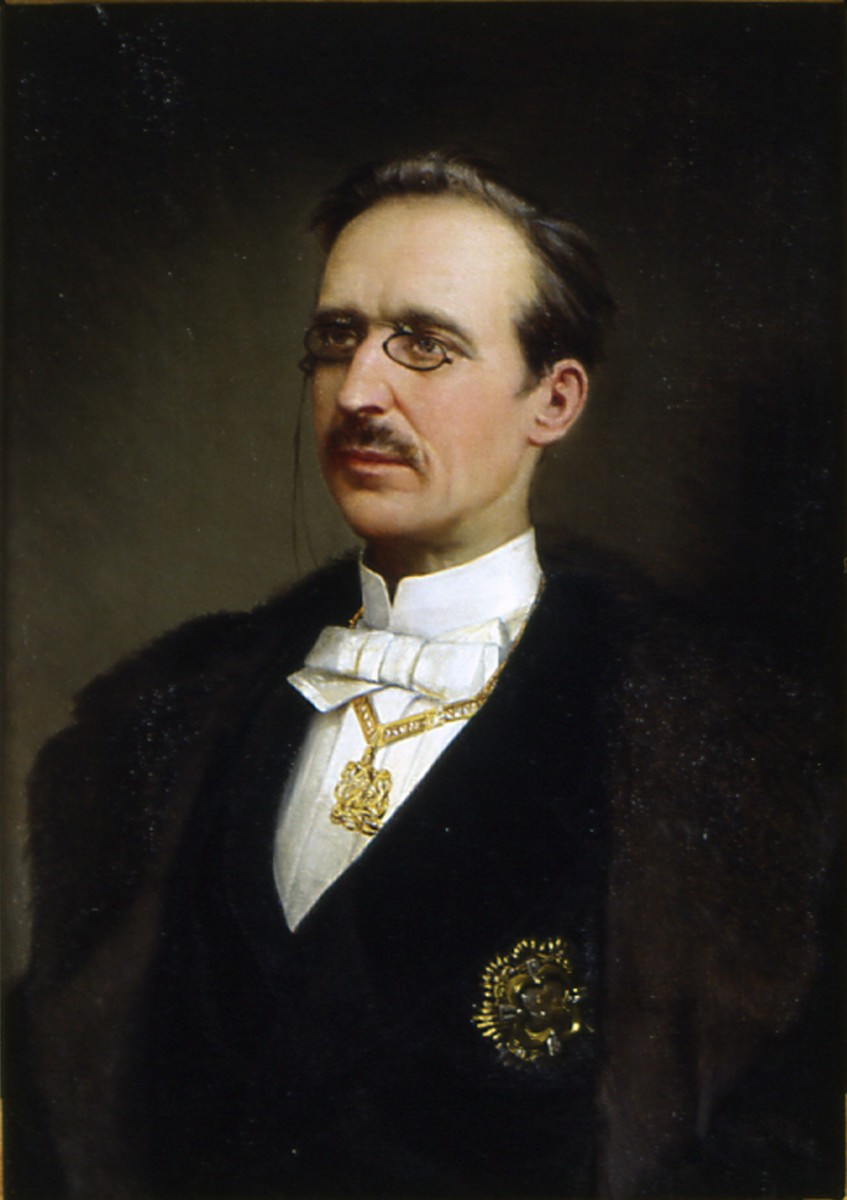

Prime Minister of Italy
- In office 10 April 1867 – 27 October 1867
- Monarch: Victor Emmanuel II
- Preceded by: Bettino Ricasoli
- Succeeded by: Luigi Federico Menabrea
- In office 3 March 1862 – 8 December 1862
- Monarch: Victor Emmanuel II
- Preceded by: Bettino Ricasoli
- Succeeded by: Luigi Carlo Farini

President of the Chamber of Deputies
- In office 18 February 1861 – 3 March 1862
- Monarch: Victor Emmanuel II
- Preceded by: Giovanni Lanza
- Succeeded by: Sebastiano Tecchio
- In office 10 January 1859 – 21 January 1860
- Monarch: Victor Emmanuel II
- Preceded by: Carlo Bon Compagni
- Succeeded by: Giovanni Lanza
- In office 11 May 1852 – 27 October 1853
- Monarch: Victor Emmanuel II
- Preceded by: Pier Dionigi Pinelli
- Succeeded by: Carlo Bon Compagni

Member of the Chamber of Deputies
- In office 18 February 1861 – 5 June 1873
- Constituency: Alessandria (1st); Tortona (2nd)

Personal details
- Born: 20 June 1808 Alessandria, French Empire
- Died: 5 June 1873 (aged 64) Frosinone, Kingdom of Italy
- Party: Historical Left
- Spouse(s): Marie Bonaparte-Wyse (m. 1863–1873); his death
- Children: Romana Rattazzi
- Education: University of Turin
- Profession: Lawyer

Urbano Pio Francesco Rattazzi (Italian pronunciation: [urˈbaːno ratˈtattsi]; 29 June 1808 – 5 June 1873) was an Italian politician and statesman.

== Personal life ==
He was born in Alessandria, Piedmont. He studied law at Turin, and in 1838 began his practice, which met with marked success in the capital and Casale. His wife, Laetitia Marie Wyse Bonaparte, whom he married in 1863, was a noted French novelist and a grandniece of Emperor Napoleon I. Together they had one daughter: Romana Rattazzi (1871–1943).

== Career ==
In 1848, Rattazzi was sent to the Sardinian Chamber of Deputies in Turin as representative of his native town. He allied himself with the Liberal party, i.e. Democrats. By his debating powers, he contributed to the defeat of the Balbo ministry, and in August received the portfolio of Public Instruction, though he left office after a few days. In December, in the Gioberti cabinet, he became Minister of the Interior, and on the fall of Gioberti, in February 1849, Rattazzi was entrusted with the formation of a new cabinet. The defeat at Novara compelled Rattazzi's resignation in March 1849.

He left the Democrats for the Moderate Liberals and formed the group of the centre-left. This party formed a coalition with the centre-right headed by Cavour. This coalition was known as the connubio, i.e. the union of the moderate men of the Right and of the Left, and brought about the fall of the d'Azeglio cabinet in November 1852 and the organization of a new ministry by Cavour. Rattazzi gave up a Parliament presidency in 1853 to become Minister of Justice and later Minister of the Interior. As Minister of the Interior, he carried out a number of measures of reform, including that for the suppression of certain of the monastic orders, partial secularization of church property, and restricting the influence of the religious associations. This precipitated a bitter struggle with the Clerical party. During a momentary reaction of public opinion, he resigned office in 1858, but again entered the cabinet under La Marmora in 1859 as Minister of the Interior.

In consequence of the negotiations for the cession of Nice and Savoy to France, which cession he opposed, he again retired in January 1860. On changing his views on this policy, he became president of the lower chamber in the first Italian Parliament, and in March 1862 succeeded Ricasoli in the government, retaining for himself the portfolios of Foreign Affairs and of the Interior. However, in consequence of his policy of repression towards Garibaldi at Aspromonte, he was driven from office in the following December. He was again Prime Minister in 1867, from April to October. Popular reaction to his hostility to Garibaldi again drove him from office. He died at Frosinone on 5 June 1873.

Political offices
Preceded by Carlo Bon Compagni di Mombello	Piedmontese Minister of the Instruction; 1848	Succeeded by Vincenzo Gioberti
Preceded by Felice Merlo	Piedmontese Minister of Justice; 1848–1849	Succeeded by Riccardo Sineo
Preceded by Riccardo Sineo	Piedmontese Minister of the Interior; 1849	Succeeded by Pier Dionigi Pinelli
Preceded by Pier Dionigi Pinelli	Chairman of the Piedmontese Chamber of Deputies; 1852–1853	Succeeded by Carlo Bon Compagni di Mombello
Preceded by Carlo Bon Compagni di Mombello	Piedmontese Minister of Justice; 1853–1855	Succeeded by Giovanni De Foresta
Preceded by Gustavo Ponza di San Martino	Piedmontese Minister of the Interior; 1854–1858	Succeeded by Camillo Benso di Cavour
Preceded by Carlo Bon Compagni di Mombello	Chairman of the Piedmontese Chamber of Deputies; 1859–1860	Succeeded by Giovanni Lanza
Preceded by Camillo Benso di Cavour	Piedmontese Minister of the Interior; 1859–1860	Succeeded by Camillo Benso di Cavour
Preceded by Giovanni Lanza	Chairman of the Italian Chamber of Deputies; 1861–1862	Succeeded by Sebastiano Tecchio
Preceded by Bettino Ricasoli	Prime Minister of Italy; 1862	Succeeded by Luigi Carlo Farini
Preceded by Bettino Ricasoli	Italian Minister of Foreign Affairs; 1862	Succeeded by Giuseppe Pasolini
Preceded by Bettino Ricasoli	Italian Minister of the Interior; 1862	Succeeded by Ubaldino Peruzzi
Preceded by Bettino Ricasoli	Prime Minister of Italy; 1867	Succeeded by Luigi Federico Menabrea
Preceded by Bettino Ricasoli	Italian Minister of the Interior; 1867	Succeeded by Filippo Antonio Gualterio
