= L'Armonia =

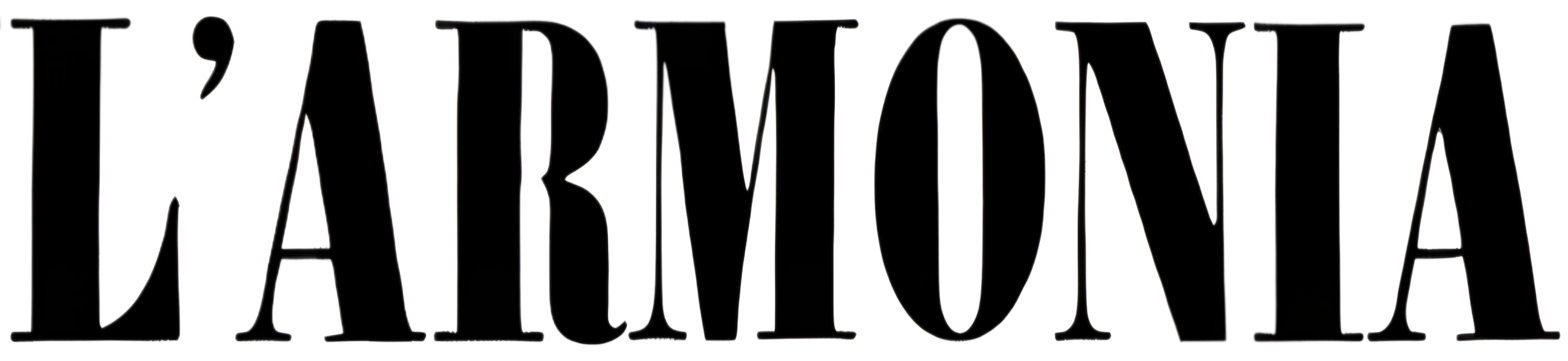
- Founder: Giacomo Margotti
- Founded: July 1848
- Final issue: 1866
- Based in: Turin
- Language: Italian

L'Armonia was an Italian language newspaper established in Turin in July 1848. It was established by a Catholic priest Giacomo Margotti and other priests. Margotti also edited it. It was ultra-conservative and Catholic in orientation. Its mission was to support for the Catholic Church. It was the first Italian publication to publish an account and several sections of the Book of Mormon. This content was published on 1 August 1853 in a supplement.

== History ==
The first issue of L'Armonia was published on 4 July 1848. Initially a biweekly, then triweekly, L'Armonia was conservative and Catholic in orientation, but initially adopted a moderate stance due to the presence of liberal Catholic figures among its key editors. Contributors included the theologian Gaetano Alimonda, Marquis Gustavo Benso di Cavour and Antonio Rosmini.

Throughout 1848, L’Armonia covered the war against Austria, adopting a patriotic stance in support of the monarchy and urging priests to fulfil their civic duty by defending their struggling homeland. Following the Piedmontese defeat in the war, L’Armonia became increasingly conservative. In 1850, the paper launched a campaign against the Siccardi Laws, deeming them schismatic, unjust and offensive to religious sentiment. As a result, the newspaper incurred a series of seizures, complaints, and fines. This culminated in the arrest of the Archbishop of Turin, Luigi Fransoni, in March 1850. He was sentenced to a month in prison for urging the clergy to ignore the law abolishing the ecclesiastical court. In protest, L'Armonia published a half-page issue, while its director Giacomo Margotti published two polemical pamphlets against the government. In both, the author abandoned the academic form and assumed the pungent and witty tones of political satire.

The shift to the right of L'Armonia soured relations with Gustavo di Cavour, who was refused the possibility of publishing his response to a letter in support of his brother Camillo that was published on 28 August 1850 on Il Risorgimento. Under the influence of Margotti, the periodical increasingly embraced the positions of intransigent Catholicism, seeing its circulation rise to over 3,000 copies. In 1855, L'Armonia became a daily newspaper. The newspaper was suppressed by Cavour in 1859, but was re-established after the Second Italian War of Independence. In 1863, Margotti left L'Armonia and, acting on Pius IX's advice, founded Unità Cattolica, which he directed until his death. L'Armonia ceased publication three years later, in 1866.
