= Carlo Bon Compagni di Mombello =

Italian judge, educator and politician

Carlo Bon Compagni Count of Mombello
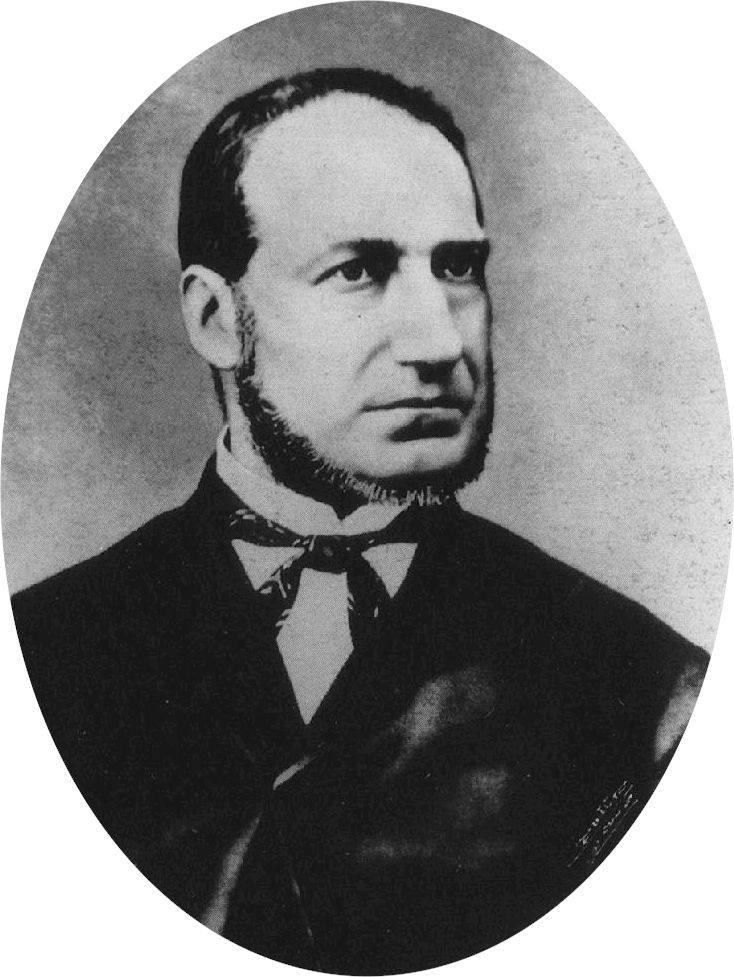

President of the Chamber of Deputies
- In office 16 November 1853 – 16 June 1856
- Monarch: Victor Emmanuel II
- Preceded by: Urbano Rattazzi
- Succeeded by: Carlo Cadorna
- In office 14 December 1857 – 14 July 1858
- Preceded by: Carlo Cadorna
- Succeeded by: Urbano Rattazzi

Governor of the Royal Provinces of Emilia
- In office 8 December 1859 – 22 March 1860
- Monarch: Victor Emmanuel II
- Preceded by: Office created
- Succeeded by: Office abolished

Personal details
- Born: 25 July 1804 Turin, French First Republic
- Died: 14 December 1880 (aged 76) Turin, Kingdom of Italy
- Party: Historical Right
- Education: University of Turin
- Profession: Judge; Pedagogue

Carlo Bon Compagni, Count of Mombello (Turin, 25 July 1804 – Turin, 14 December 1880) was an Italian judge, educator and politician.

Bon Compagni served in early constitutional governments of the Kingdom of Sardinia. He was Minister of Public Education in the Balbo, di Sostegno, and di San Martino cabinets. He was also Minister of Grace and Justice in the second D'Azeglio cabinet and the first Cavour cabinet. A two-time President of the Chamber of Deputies, he became a senator in the unified Kingdom of Italy on 15 November 1874. His father was a prominent lawyer who served as attorney general for the Arno Department in Florence from 1809 to 1814 and was appointed as attorney general of the king at the Senate of Savoy, which he served until his death in 1815, when Carlo was 11 years old.
