= Benjamin Artom =

Haham of the Spanish and Portuguese Jews of Great Britain

Personal life
- Born: 1835 Asti, Piedmont, Kingdom of Sardinia
- Died: January 6, 1879 (aged 43–44) 3 Marine Parade, Brighton, Great Britain
- Occupation: Rabbi

Religious life
- Religion: Judaism
- Position: Haham of the Spanish and Portuguese Jews of Great Britain
- Main work: Various odes, prayers, and sermons

Rabbi Benjamin Artom (1835–1879) was the Haham of the Spanish and Portuguese Jews of Great Britain. He was born in Asti, Piedmont, in the Kingdom of Sardinia.

== Biography ==
He was the first person to hold the post of rabbi of Naples. In 1866, he accepted a call to become the spiritual leader, or Haham, of the Spanish and Portuguese Jews in Britain, and held the post until his death on 6 January 1879 at 3 Marine Parade, Brighton.

He composed a prayer for boys on the occasion of their Bar Mitzvah that was at one time used in most Orthodox synagogues in Britain and is still used in the Spanish and Portuguese ones. Chief rabbi of the Spanish and Portuguese congregation of London; born at Asti, Italy, in 1835; died at Brighton, near London, Jan. 6, 1879. He was left fatherless when a child, and his maternal uncle supervised his early training. His theological education he owed to the rabbis Marco Tedeschi, of Trieste, and Terracini. At twenty he taught Hebrew, Italian, French, English, and German. His first appointment was that of minister to the congregation of Saluzzo near Genoa. While rabbi of a congregation in Naples he received a call to London, where he was installed as chief rabbi of the Spanish and Portuguese congregations of the United Kingdom (Dec. 16, 1866). After a year's stay in England, he became so proficient in English that he could preach in that language with eloquence. Deeply interested in Anglo-Jewish institutions, he directed his attention chiefly to organizing and superintending the educational establishments of his own congregation, the Sha'are Tikvah and Villareal schools. Although of Orthodox views, he welcomed moderate reforms, and endeavored to promote any enterprise tending toward the union of discordant factions. He was author of various odes and prayers in Hebrew, and several pieces of Italian poetry. A selection of his sermons delivered in England was published in 1873.
