= Siccardi laws =

Italian laws of 1850

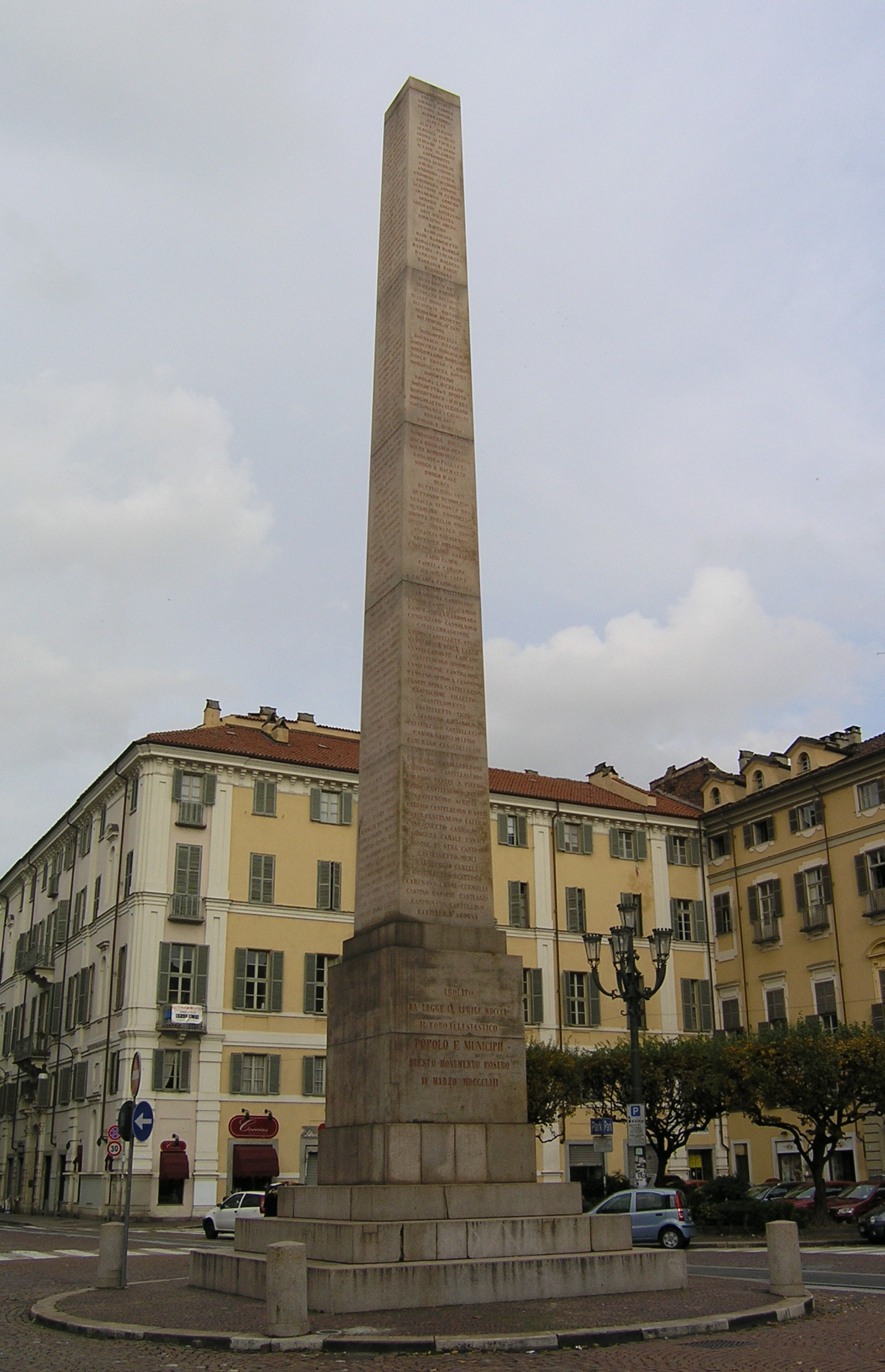
Obelisk to the Siccardi laws in Turin, Italy

The Siccardi laws of 1850 were landmark legal reforms passed in the Kingdom of Sardinia-Piedmont that abolished special privileges for the Catholic clergy, establishing the separation of church and state. The laws abolished ecclesiastical immunities, reduced legal holidays, and eliminated the right of asylum in churches. They were introduced by Giuseppe Siccardi and passed as three separate laws.

These are the most well-known laws within the legislative framework regarding ecclesiastical matters that was established in Sardinia and Piedmont between 1848 and 1861, and subsequently extended and expanded to the Kingdom of Italy.

Resistance to these laws continued after their promulgation. The pope withdrew his nuncio from Turin. The Archbishop of Turin, Luigi Fransoni, was tried and sentenced to a month in prison for inviting the clergy to disobey these provisions.
