= Lorenzo Pareto =

Sardinian geologist

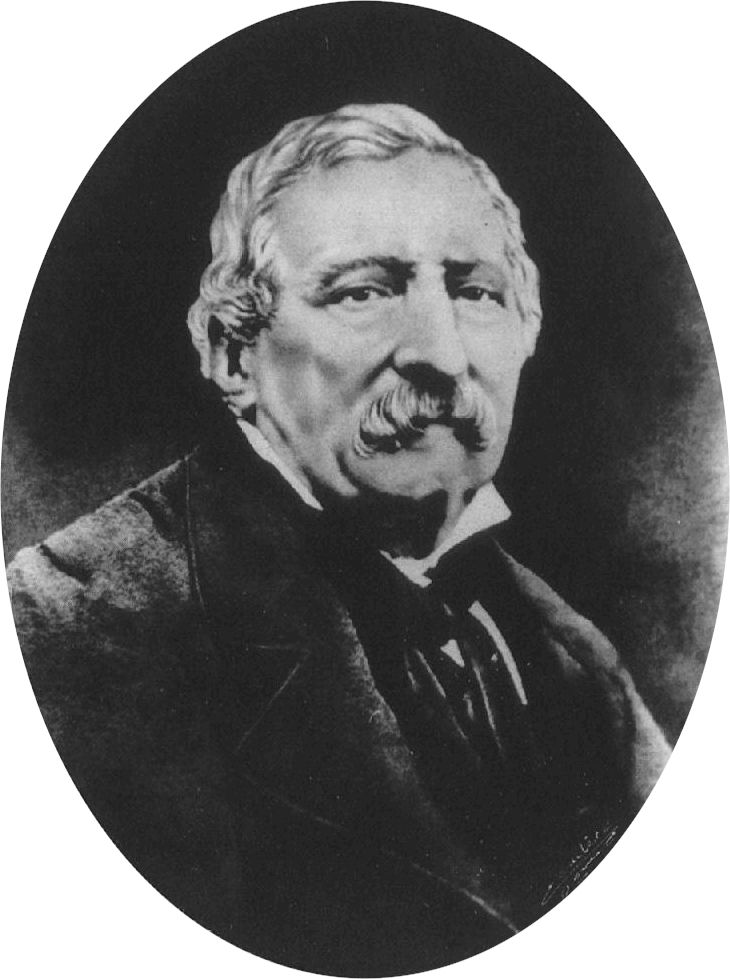
Lorenzo Pareto

Lorenzo Nicolò Pareto (Genoa, 6 December 1800 – Genoa, 19 June 1865) was an Italian geologist and statesman.

As a man of science, he is considered one of the fathers of modern geology. A member of the Italian National Academy of Sciences, he is credited with naming the Villafranchian age, a European land mammal age between 3 and 2 million years ago overlapping the end of the Pliocene era and beginning of the Pleistocene era.

As a politician, he is remembered as a member of Giovine Italia and a patriot during the period of Italian unification. He was the President of the Chamber of Deputies of the 2nd and 3rd legislatures of Kingdom of Sardinia, and served as foreign minister in the cabinet of Italian writer and statesman Cesare Balbo, first constitutional prime minister of Piedmont.
