= Petto =

Petto is an Italian adjective meaning "breasted" or "chested" (as in white-breasted cormorant or, in Italian, cormorano pettobianco). It is also a Japanese gairaigo noun meaning "pet". It may refer to:

== People ==
- Samuel Petto (c. 1624–1711) English Calvinist clergyman and theologian
- Tomasso Petto (c. 1879–1905), American mobster and contract killer

== Other ==
- Doppio Petto, 1997 Italian-language film
- In petto, an Italian term used in the Catholic Church referring to an action or thing meant to be secret; Latin: in pectore
- Kimi wa Petto, a 2000–2005 Japanese-language comic book (manga) series, that was also adapted for film and television [see: Tramps Like Us]
- Voce di petto, a term used within vocal music [see: Chest voice]
