= Francesco Crispi =

Italian patriot and statesman (1818–1901)

His Excellency Francesco Crispi OSSA, OSML, OCI, OMS
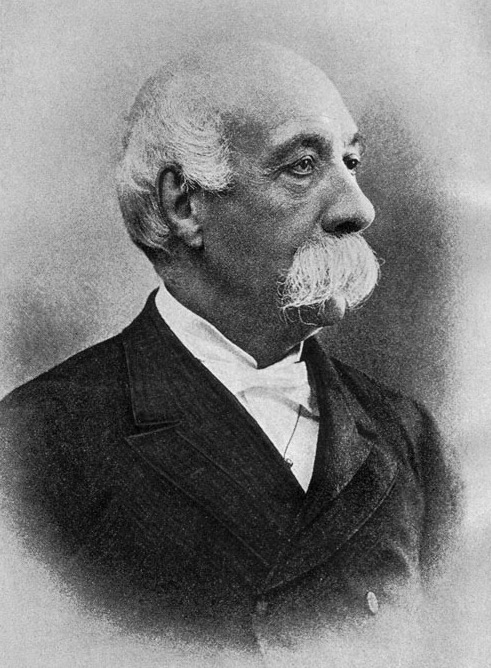

Prime Minister of Italy
- In office 15 December 1893 – 10 March 1896
- Monarch: Umberto I
- Preceded by: Giovanni Giolitti
- Succeeded by: Antonio Starabba
- In office 29 July 1887 – 6 February 1891
- Monarch: Umberto I
- Preceded by: Agostino Depretis
- Succeeded by: Antonio Starabba

President of the Chamber of Deputies
- In office 26 November 1876 – 26 December 1877
- Preceded by: Giuseppe Branchieri
- Succeeded by: Benedetto Cairoli

Minister of the Interior
- In office 15 December 1893 – 9 March 1896
- Prime Minister: Himself
- Preceded by: Giovanni Giolitti
- Succeeded by: Antonio Starabba
- In office 4 April 1887 – 6 February 1891
- Prime Minister: Agostino Depretis; Himself
- Preceded by: Agostino Depretis
- Succeeded by: Giovanni Nicotera
- In office 26 December 1877 – 7 March 1878
- Prime Minister: Agostino Depretis
- Preceded by: Giovanni Nicotera
- Succeeded by: Agostino Depretis

Minister of Foreign Affairs
- In office 29 July 1887 – 6 February 1891
- Prime Minister: Himself
- Preceded by: Agostino Depretis
- Succeeded by: Antonio Starabba

Member of the Chamber of Deputies
- In office 18 February 1861 – 2 March 1897
- Constituency: Castelvetrano (1861–1870); Tricarico (1870–1880); Palermo (1880–1897)

Personal details
- Born: 4 October 1818 Ribera, Kingdom of the Two Sicilies
- Died: 11 August 1901 (aged 82) Naples, Kingdom of Italy
- Party: Historical Left (1848–1883; 1886–1901); Dissident Left (1883–1886)
- Spouses: Rosina D'Angelo (m. 1837; died 1839) Rosalia Montmasson (m. 1854; div. 1878) Lina Barbagallo (m. 1878)
- Relations: Giuseppe Crispi (Uncle)
- Children: 3
- Parent(s): Tommaso Crispi, Giuseppa Genova
- Education: University of Palermo
- Profession: Lawyer; journalist

Francesco Crispi (4 October 1818 – 11 August 1901) was an Italian revolutionary, statesman, and politician. During his tenure as Prime Minister, he pursued an anti-French foreign policy, promoting the Triple Alliance and the colonial expansion of Italy, while domestically he cracked down harshly on social protest movements. Between 1887 and 1896, Crispi led a total of four governments.

Born in Sicily into a family of Italo-Albanian origin, Crispi became a leading figure of the Risorgimento and was one of the organizers of the Sicilian Revolution of 1848. In the aftermath of the revolution he was forced into exile before returning in 1860 to participate in the Expedition of the Thousand. Initially a follower of Giuseppe Mazzini, he converted to royalist ideals in 1864. Anticlerical and hostile to the Vatican, he served four times as Prime Minister of Italy after the unification of Italy: from 7 August 1887, to 6 February 1891, and then from 15 December 1893, to 14 June 1896. During the first term, he also served as Minister of Foreign Affairs and Minister of the Interior; during the second, he was again Minister of the Interior. He was the first Prime Minister from Southern Italy.

His governments were distinguished by significant social reforms (such as the Zanardelli Code, which abolished the death penalty and introduced freedom of strike), but also by a crack down against anarchists and socialists, whose uprisings of the Fasci Siciliani were suppressed by martial law. In foreign policy, he cultivated friendship with Germany, which, along with Italy and Austria-Hungary, was part of the Triple Alliance. He was almost always opposed to France, against which he strengthened the army and navy. Crispi was one of the initiators of the Italian colonial empire and supported a costly expansionist policy in Africa which, after successes in Eritrea and Somalia, led to a disaster at the Battle of Adwa in Ethiopia, an event that ended his political career.

== Early life ==
Crispi's paternal family came originally from the small agricultural community of Palazzo Adriano, in south-western Sicily. It had been founded in the later fifteenth century by Orthodox Christian or Greek Catholic Albanians (Arbëreshë), who settled in Sicily after the Ottoman conquest of Albania. According to tradition, Crispi's ancestors hailed from Epirus. Crispi himself claimed (though it is unclear on what basis) that he was descended from Latins who had settled in Epirus during the Roman conquest. His grandfather was an Arbëreshë Orthodox priest; the parish priests were married men, and Arbëreshë was the family language down to the lifetime of the young Crispi.

Crispi himself was born in Ribera, Sicily, to Tommaso Crispi, a grain merchant and Giuseppa Genova from Ribera; he was baptised as a Greek Catholic. Belonging to a family of Arbëreshë descent, he spoke Italian, alongside Arbëresh (variant of Albanian), Greek and probably Sicilian. A philhellene, Crispi wrote in an 1859 diary entry he was Greek due to Greek–Albanian ancestry and attributed part of his origins to Greece. In an 1885 telegram on the Albanian question, Crispi stated he was "an Albanian by blood and heart" and an Italo–Albanian from Sicily.

At the age of five, he was sent to a family in Villafranca, where he could receive an education. In 1829, at 11 years old, he attended a seminary in Palermo, where he studied classical subjects. The rector of the institute was Giuseppe Crispi, his uncle, who wrote the first monograph on the Albanian language. Crispi attended the seminary until 1834 or 1835, when his father, after becoming mayor of Ribera, encountered major difficulties in health and finances.

In the same period, Crispi became a close friend of the poet and doctor Vincenzo Navarro, whose friendship marked his initiation to the Romanticism. In 1835 he studied law and literature at the University of Palermo receiving a law degree in 1837; in the same year, he fell in love with Rosina D'Angelo, the daughter of a goldsmith. Despite his father's ban, Crispi married Rosina in 1837, when she was already pregnant. In May Crispi became the father of his first daughter, Giuseppa, who was named after his grandmother. It was a brief marriage: Rosina died on 29 July 1839, the day after giving birth to her second son, Tommaso; the child lived only a few hours and in December, also Giuseppa died.

Between 1838 and 1839, Crispi founded his own newspaper, L'Oreteo, from the name of the Sicilian river Oreto. This experience brought him into contact with a number of political figures including the Neapolitan liberal activist and poet, Carlo Poerio. In 1842 Crispi wrote about the necessity to educate poor people, about the huge damage caused by the excessive wealth of the Catholic Church and regarding the need for all citizens, including women, to be equal before the law.

In 1845 Crispi took up a judgeship in Naples, where he distinguished himself for his liberal and revolutionary ideas.

== 1848 Sicilian uprising ==
On 20 December 1847, Crispi was sent to Palermo along with Salvatore Castiglia, a diplomat and patriot, to prepare the revolution against the Bourbon monarchy and King Ferdinand II of the Two Sicilies.

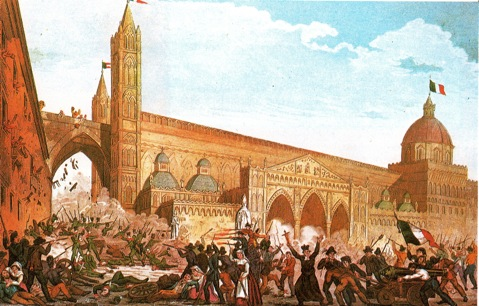
The uprising in Palermo, 1848

The revolution started on 12 January 1848, and therefore was the very first of the numerous revolutions to occur that year. Three revolutions had previously occurred on the island of Sicily starting from 1800 against Bourbon rule. The uprising was substantially organized from, and centred in, Palermo. The popular nature of the revolt is evident in the fact that posters and notices were being handed out a full three days before the substantive acts of the revolution occurred on 12 January 1848. The timing was deliberately planned, by Crispi and the other revolutionaries, to coincide with the birthday of Ferdinand II.

The Sicilian nobles were immediately able to resuscitate the constitution of 1812, which included the principles of representative democracy and the centrality of Parliament in the government of the state. Vincenzo Fardella was elected president of Sicilian Parliament. The idea was also put forward for a confederation of all the states of Italy.

The constitution was quite advanced for its time in liberal democratic terms, as was the proposal of an Italian confederation of states. Crispi was appointed a member of the provisional Sicilian Parliament and responsible for the Defence Committee; during his tenure, he supported the separatist movement that wanted to break ties with Naples.

Thus Sicily survived as a quasi-independent state for sixteen months, with the Bourbon army taking back full control of the island on 15 May 1849 by force. The effective head of state during this period was Ruggero Settimo. On capitulating to the Bourbons, Settimo escaped to Malta where he was received with the full honours of a head of state. Unlike many, Crispi was not granted amnesty and was forced to flee the country.

== Exile ==
After leaving Sicily, Crispi took refuge in Marseille, France, where he met the woman who would become his second wife, Rose Montmasson, born five years after him in Haute-Savoie (which at that time belonged to the Kingdom of Sardinia) in a family of farmers.

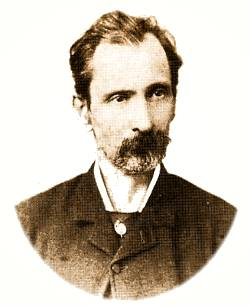
Portrait of Francesco Crispi during the 1850s

In 1849, he moved to Turin, the capital of the Kingdom of Sardinia, where he worked as a journalist. During this period he became a friend of Giuseppe Mazzini, a republican politician, journalist and activist. In 1853 Crispi was implicated in the Mazzini conspiracy and was arrested by the Piedmontese policy and sent to Malta. Here, on 27 December 1854, he married Rose Montmasson.

Then he moved to London where he became a revolutionary conspirator and continued his close friendship with Mazzini, involving himself in the exile politics of the national movement, abandoning Sicilian separatism.

On 10 January 1856, he moved to Paris, where he continued his work as a journalist. On 22 August, he was informed that his father had died and that three years earlier also his mother had died, but that news had been hidden by his father who did not want to increase his sorrows.

=== Assassination attempt on Napoleon III ===
On the evening of 14 January 1858, as the Emperor Napoleon III and the Empress Eugénie de Montijo were on their way to the theatre in the Rue Le Peletier, the precursor of the Opera Garnier, to see, rather ironically, Rossini's William Tell, the Italian revolutionary Felice Orsini and his accomplices threw three bombs at the imperial carriage. The first bomb landed among the horsemen in front of the carriage. The second bomb wounded the animals and smashed the carriage glass. The third bomb landed under the carriage and seriously wounded a policeman who was hurrying to protect the occupants. Eight people were killed and 142 wounded, though the emperor and empress were unhurt.

Orsini himself was wounded on the right temple and stunned. He tended his wounds and returned to his lodgings, where police found him the next day.

Of the five conspirators, only one remained unidentified. In 1908 (seven years after Crispi's death) one of them, Charles DeRudio, claimed to have seen, half an hour before the attack, a man approaching and talking with Orsini, and recognized him as Crispi. But no evidence has ever been found regarding Crispi's role in the attack. Anyway on 7 August 1858, he was expelled from France.

== In Sicily with Garibaldi ==
=== Expedition of the Thousand ===
In June 1859 Crispi returned to Italy after publishing a letter repudiating the aggrandizement of Piedmont in the Italian unification. He proclaimed himself a republican and a partisan of national unity. He travelled around Italy under various disguises and with counterfeit passports. Twice in that year he went the round of the Sicilian cities in disguise preparing the insurrectionist movement of 1860. Crispi briefly visited Greece in October 1859.

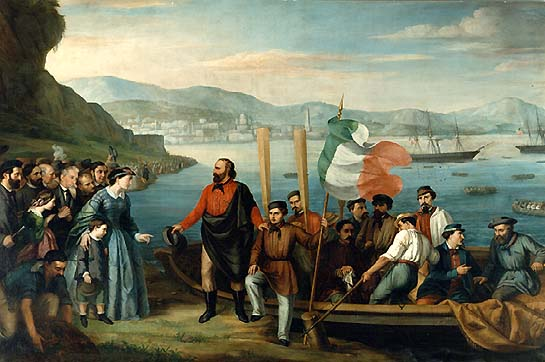
The beginning of the expedition, to Sicily, at Quarto dei Mille, Genoa

He helped persuade Giuseppe Garibaldi to sail with his Expedition of the Thousand, which disembarked on Sicily on 11 May 1860. The Expedition was formed by a corps of volunteers led by Garibaldi, who landed in Sicily in order to conquer the Kingdom of the Two Sicilies, ruled by the Bourbons. The project was an ambitious and risky venture aiming to conquer, with a thousand men, a kingdom with a larger regular army and a more powerful navy. The expedition was a success and concluded with a plebiscite that brought Naples and Sicily into the Kingdom of Sardinia, the last territorial conquest before the creation of the Kingdom of Italy on 17 March 1861.

The sea venture was the only desired action that was jointly decided by the "four fathers of the nation" Giuseppe Mazzini, Giuseppe Garibaldi, Victor Emmanuel II, and Camillo Cavour, pursuing divergent goals. Crispi utilized his political influence to bolster the Italian unification project.Duggan 2002b

The various groups participated in the expedition for a variety of reasons: for Garibaldi, it was to achieve a united Italy; for the Sicilian bourgeoisie, an independent Sicily as part of the kingdom of Italy, and for the mass farmers, land distribution and the end of oppression.

=== Garibaldi dictatorship ===
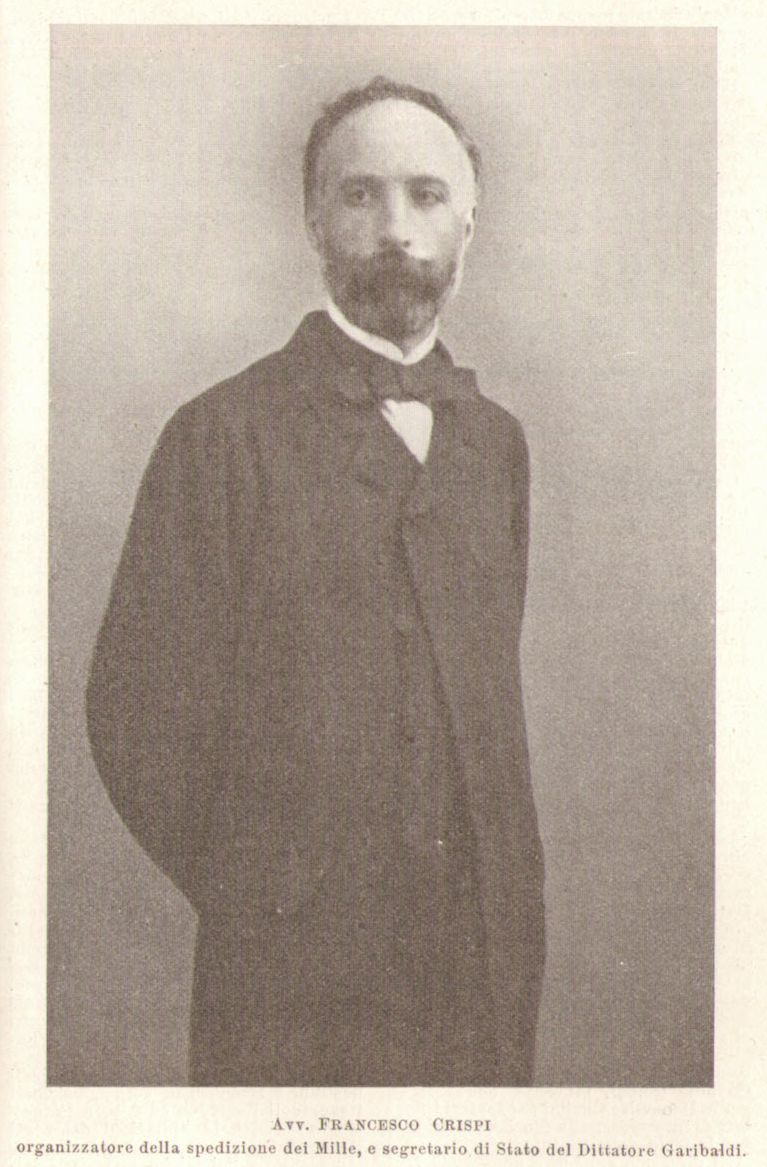
Francesco Crispi as Secretary of State in 1860

After the fall of Palermo, Crispi was appointed First Secretary of State in the provisional government; shortly a struggle began between Garibaldi's government and the emissaries of Cavour on the question of timing of the annexation of Sicily by Italy. It established a Sicilian Army and a fleet of the Dictatorship Government of Sicily.

The pace of Garibaldi's victories had worried Cavour, who in early July sent to the provisional government a proposal of immediate annexation of Sicily to Piedmont. Garibaldi, however, refused vehemently to allow such a move until the end of the war. Cavour's envoy, Giuseppe La Farina, was arrested and expelled from the island. He was replaced by the more malleable Agostino Depretis, who gained Garibaldi's trust and was appointed as pro-dictator.

During the dictatorial government of Garibaldi, Crispi secured the resignation of the pro-dictator Depretis, and continued his fierce opposition to Cavour.

In Naples, Garibaldi's provisional government was largely controlled by Cavour. Crispi, who arrived in the city in mid-September, tried to increase his power and influence, at the expense of Cavour's loyalists. However, the revolutionary impulse that had animated the Expedition was fading, especially after the Battle of Volturnus.

On 3 October 1860, to seal an alliance with King Victor Emmanuel II, Garibaldi appointed pro-dictator of Naples, Giorgio Pallavicino, a supporter of the House of Savoy. Pallavicino immediately stated that Crispi was unable and inappropriate to hold the office of Secretary of State.

Meanwhile, Cavour stated that Southern Italy would not accept anything but the unconditional annexation to the Kingdom of Sardinia by plebiscite. Crispi, who still had the hope to continue the revolution to rescue Rome and Venice, strongly opposed this solution, proposing to elect a parliamentary assembly. This proposal was also supported by the federalist Carlo Cattaneo. Garibaldi announced that the decision would have been taken by the two pro-dictators of Sicily and Naples, Antonio Mordini and Giorgio Pallavicino, who both opted for the plebiscite. On 13 October Crispi resigned from the government of Garibaldi.

== Member of the Parliament ==
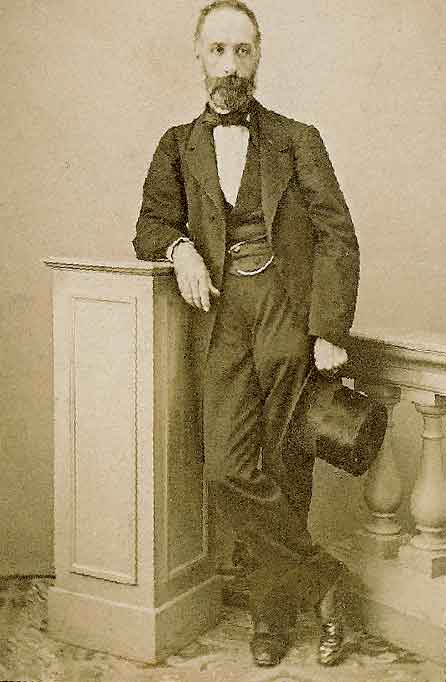
Crispi during his first term as member of the Parliament

The general election of 1861 took place on 27 January, even before the formal birth of the Kingdom of Italy, which took place on 17 March. Francesco Crispi was elected as a member of the Historical Left, in the constituency of Castelvetrano; he would retain his seat in all successive legislatures until the end of his life.

Crispi acquired the reputation of being the most aggressive and most impetuous member of his parliamentary group. He denounced the Right for "diplomatising the revolution". Personal ambition and restlessness made him difficult to cooperate with and he earned himself the nickname of Il Solitario (The Loner). In 1864, he finally deserted Mazzini and announced he was a monarchist, because as he put it in a letter to Mazzini: "The monarchy unites us; the republic would divide us."

In 1866 he refused to enter Baron Bettino Ricasoli's cabinet; in 1867 he worked to impede the Garibaldian invasion of the papal states, foreseeing the French occupation of Rome and the disaster of Mentana. By methods of the same character as those subsequently employed against himself by Felice Cavallotti, he carried on the violent agitation known as the Lobbia affair, in which sundry conservative deputies were, on insufficient grounds, accused of corruption. On the outbreak of the Franco-German War, he worked energetically to impede the projected alliance with France, and to drive the Giovanni Lanza cabinet to Rome. The death of Urbano Rattazzi in 1873 induced Crispi's friends to put forward his candidature to the leadership of the Left; but Crispi, anxious to reassure the crown, secured the election of Agostino Depretis.

=== President of the Chamber of Deputies ===
After the general election in 1876, in which the Left gained almost 70% of votes, Crispi was elected President of the Chamber of Deputies.

During the autumn of 1877, as President of the Chamber, he went to London, Paris and Berlin on a confidential mission, establishing cordial personal relationships with British prime minister William Ewart Gladstone and Foreign Minister Lord Granville and other English statesmen, and with Otto von Bismarck, by then Chancellor of the German Empire. In 1877 during the Great Eastern Crisis Crispi was offered Albania as possible compensation by Bismarck and the British Earl of Derby if Austria-Hungary annexed Bosnia, however, he refused and preferred the Italian Alpine regions under Austro-Hungarian rule.

== Minister of the Interior ==
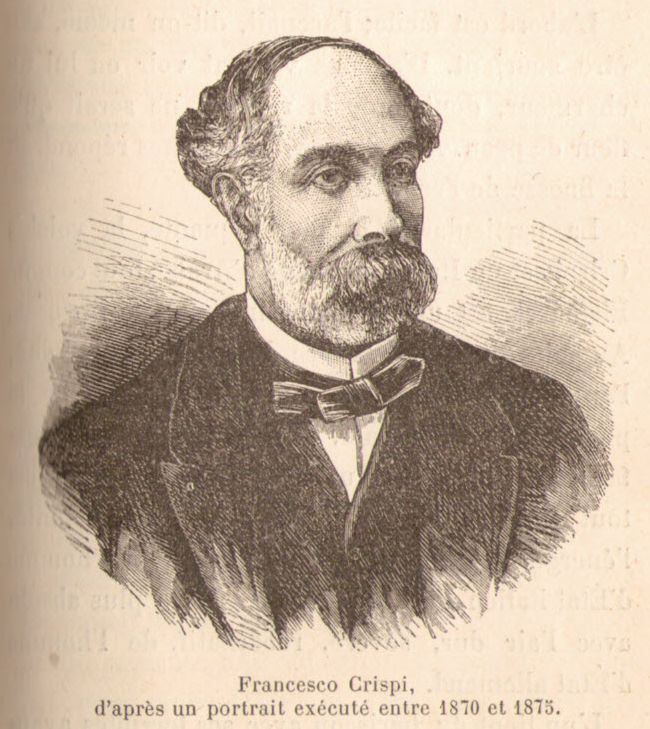
Francesco Crispi in 1870s

In December 1877 he replaced Giovanni Nicotera as Minister of the Interior in the cabinet of Depretis. Although his short term of office lasted just 70 days, they were instrumental in establishing a unitary monarchy. Moreover, during his term as minister, Crispi tried to unite the many factions which were part of the Left, at that time.

On 9 January 1878, the death of Victor Emmanuel II of Italy and the accession of King Umberto enabled Crispi to secure the formal establishment of a unitary monarchy, the new monarch taking the title of Umberto I of Italy instead of Umberto IV of Savoy.

On 7 February 1878, the death of Pope Pius IX necessitated a conclave, the first to be held after the unification of Italy. Crispi, helped by Mancini and Cardinal Pecci (afterwards Leo XIII), persuaded the Sacred College to hold the conclave in Rome, establishing the legitimacy of the capital.

== Bigamy scandal and political isolation ==
The statesmanlike qualities displayed on this occasion were insufficient to avert the storm of indignation of Crispi's opponents when he was accused of bigamy. When he remarried, a woman he had married in 1853 was still living. But a court ruled that Crispi's 1853 marriage on Malta was invalid because it was contracted while another woman he had married yet earlier was also still alive. By the time of his third marriage, his first wife had died and his marriage to his second wife was legally invalid. Therefore, his marriage to his third wife was ruled valid and not bigamous. He was nevertheless compelled to resign office after only three months in March 1878, bringing down the whole government with him.

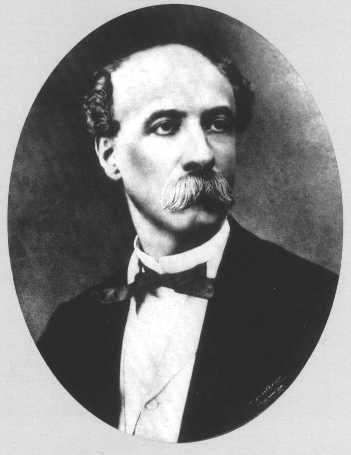
An official portrait of Crispi

For nine years Crispi remained politically under a cloud, leading the "progressive" opposition. In 1881 Crispi was among the main supporters of the universal male suffrage, which was approved by the government of Agostino Depretis.

=== Pentarchy ===
In 1883 the leaders of the Left, Agostino Depretis, and the Right, Marco Minghetti, formed an alliance based on a flexible centrist coalition of government which isolated the extremes of the left and the right; these politics was known as Trasformismo. Crispi, who was a strong supporter of two-party system, strongly opposed it and founded a progressive and radical parliamentary group called Dissident Left. The group was also known as "The Pentarchy", due to its five leaders, Giuseppe Zanardelli, Benedetto Cairoli, Giovanni Nicotera, Agostino Magliani, Alfredo Beccarini and Crispi.

The party supported authoritarian and progressive internal policies, expansionism and Germanophile foreign policies, and protectionist economy policies.

After the general elections in May 1886, in which the Dissident Left gained almost 20% of votes, Crispi returned to office as Minister of the Interior in the Depretis cabinet. Following Depretis's death on 29 July 1887 Crispi, abandoned the Dissident Left and became the leader of the Left group; he was also appointed, by the King, Prime Minister and Minister of Foreign Affairs.

== First term as Prime Minister ==
On 29 July 1887, Francesco Crispi was sworn in as the new prime minister. He was the first one from Southern Italy. Crispi immediately distinguished himself, for being a reformist leader, but his political style provoked many protests from his opponents, who accused him of being an authoritarian Prime Minister and a strongman.

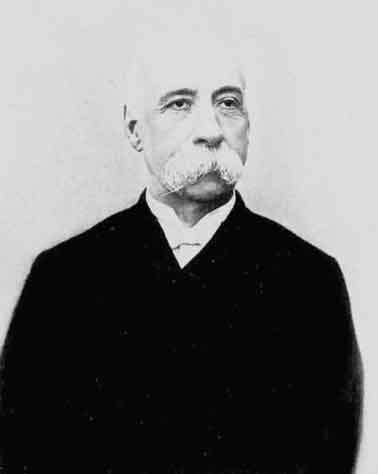
A portrait of Crispi in 1887

True to his initial progressive leanings he moved ahead with stalled reforms, abolishing the death penalty, revoking anti-strike laws, limiting police powers, and reforming the penal code and the administration of justice with the help of his Minister of Justice Giuseppe Zanardelli, reorganising charities and passing public health laws and legislation to protect emigrants that worked abroad. He sought popular support for the state with a programme of orderly development at home and expansion abroad.

=== Internal policy ===
One of the most important acts was the reform regarding the central administration of the state, with which Crispi strengthened the role of the prime minister. The bill aimed to separate the roles of the government from those of parliament, trying to untie the first by the political games of the second. The first point of the law was to give the cabinet the right to decide on the number and functions of the ministries. The prospect was also to keep the king (as well as provide the Albertine Statute) free to decide on the organization of the various ministries. Moreover, the reform provided the establishment of secretaries, who were supposed to help ministers and, at the same time, do them as spokesmen in parliament. The reform was heavily criticized by the Rightist opposition but also by the Far Left. On 9 December 1887, it was approved by the Chamber of Deputies.

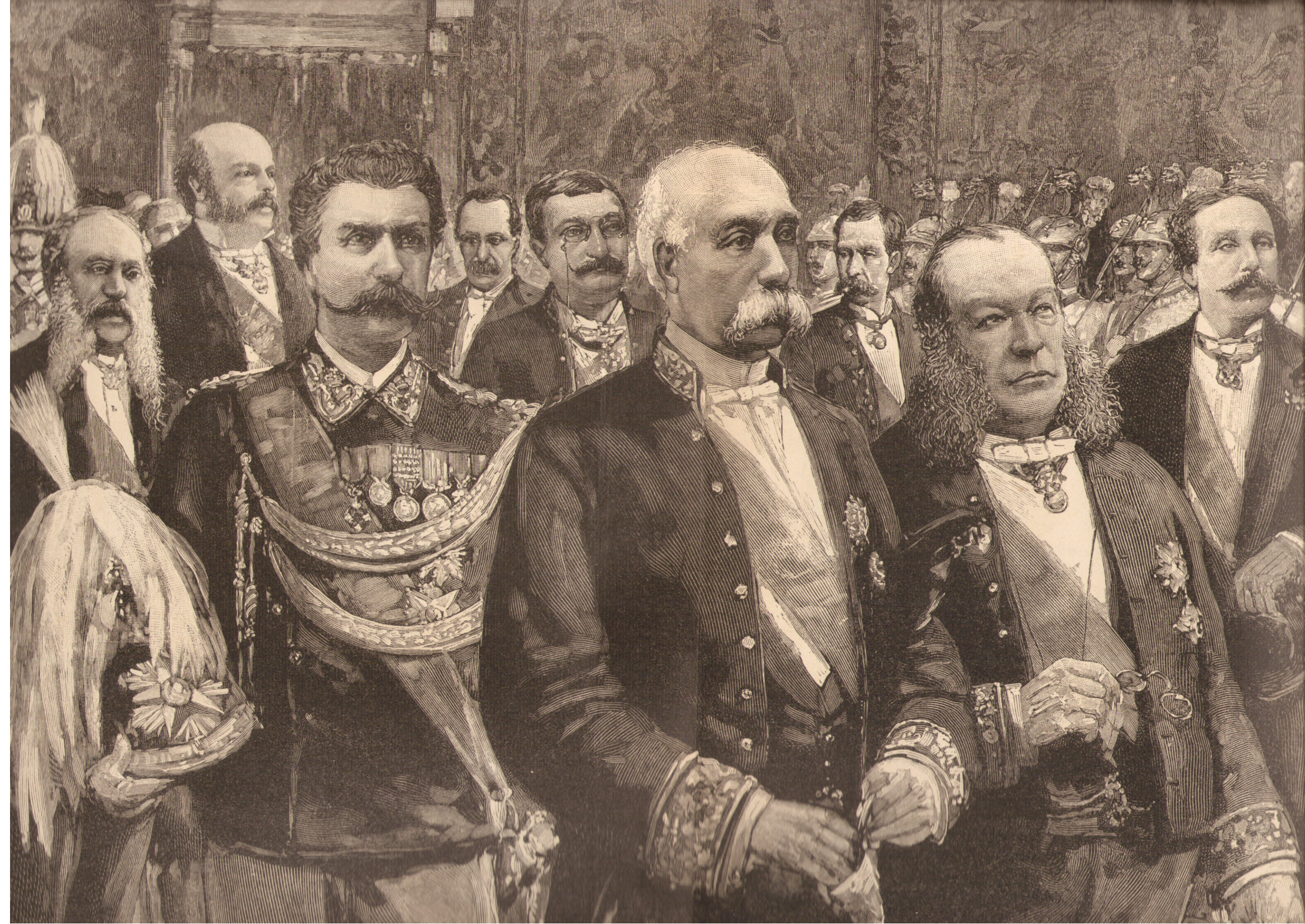
Francesco Crispi and his ministers received by the King Umberto I in the New Year's Day of 1888

In 1889 Crispi's government promoted a reform of the magistracy and promulgated a new penal code, which unified penal legislation in Italy, abolished the death sentence and recognised the right to strike. The code was regarded as a great work by contemporary European jurists. The code was named after Giuseppe Zanardelli, then Minister of Justice, who promoted the approval of the code.

Another important reform was that of local government, or comuni, which was approved by the Chamber in July 1888, in just three weeks. The new reform almost doubled the local electorate, incrementing the suffrage. But the most controversial part of the law was related to the mayors, who were previously appointed by the government, and who would now be elected by the electors, in the municipalities with more than 10,000 inhabitants and in all the provincial capitals. The law also introduced the office of the prefect. The reform was approved by the Senate in December 1888 and entered into force in February 1889.

On 22 December 1888, the Freemason Crispi enacted the first Italian law for the national healthcare system including the cremation after a cholera pandemic in 1884–1885 cholera pandemic killing approximately 50,000 persons, with a serious outbreak in the city of Naples in August–September 1884. Crispi was also the first politician to have implemented the role of the Italian lay state in the fields of charity and solidarity which till then had been traditionally kept a monopoly of private citizens and organizations, mainly of the Italian Roman Catholic Church that strongly adversed his reforms.

=== Foreign policy ===
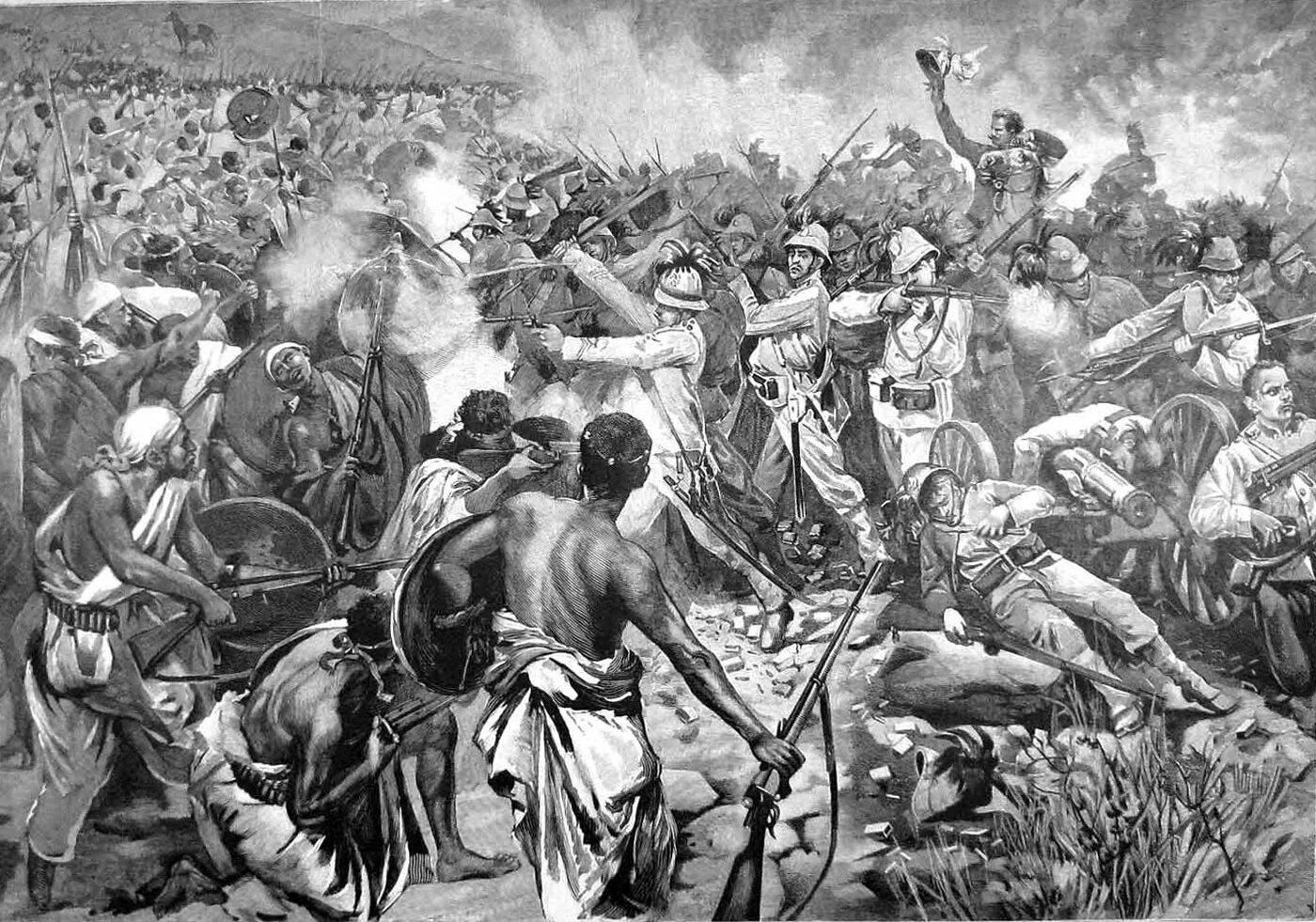
The Battle of Adwa was the climactic battle of the First Italo-Ethiopian War.

As prime minister in the 1880s and 1890s Crispi pursued an aggressive foreign policy to strengthen Italy's beleaguered institutions. He saw France as the permanent enemy and he counted heavily on British support. Britain was on good terms with France and refused to help, leaving Crispi perplexed and ultimately disillusioned about what he had felt was a special friendship between the two countries. He turned to imperialism in Africa, especially against the independent kingdom of Ethiopia, and the Ottoman province of Tripolitania (in present-day Libya).

==== Relations with Germany ====
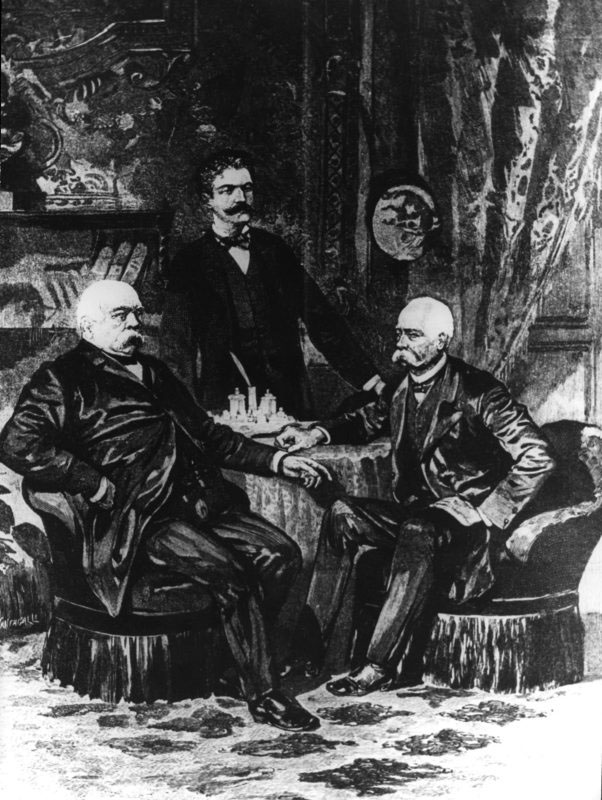
Francesco Crispi with German Chancellor Otto von Bismarck in 1887

One of his first acts as premier was a visit to the German chancellor Otto von Bismarck, whom he desired to consult upon the working of the Triple Alliance.

Basing his foreign policy upon the alliance, as supplemented by the naval entente with Great Britain negotiated by his predecessor, Carlo Felice Nicolis di Robilant, Crispi assumed a resolute attitude towards France, breaking off the prolonged and unfruitful negotiations for a new Franco-Italian commercial treaty, and refusing the French invitation to organize an Italian section at the Paris Exhibition of 1889. The Triple Alliance committed Italy to a possible war with France, requiring a vast increase in the already heavy Italian military expenditure, making the alliance unpopular in Italy. As part of his anti-French foreign policy, Crispi began a tariff war with France in 1888. The Franco-Italian trade war was an economic disaster for Italy which over a ten-year period was to cost two billion lire in lost exports, and was ended in 1898 with the Italians agreeing to end their tariffs on French goods in exchange for the French ending their tariffs on Italian goods.

==== Colonial policy ====
Francesco Crispi was a patriot and an Italian nationalist, and his desire to make Italy a colonial power led to conflicts with France, which rejected Italian claims to Tunisia and opposed Italian expansion elsewhere in Africa.

As Prime Minister, Crispi ordered general Antonio Baldissera to occupy the Eritrean highlands, Keren and Asmara in 1888-1889. A key moment was the signing of the Treaty of Wuchale; it was a deal reached by King Menelik II of Shewa, later the Emperor of Ethiopia with Count Pietro Antonelli in the town of Wuchale, on 2 May 1889. The treaty stated that the regions of Bogos, Hamasien, Akkele Guzay, and Serae were part of the Italian colony of Eritrea and is the origin of the Italian colony and modern state of Eritrea. Per the Treaty, Italy promised financial assistance and military supplies. In this period, Italy also established protectorates in Somalia.

==== Albanian question ====
In 1859, Crispi wrote a union between Greeks and Albanians would make Italy and Greece become closer. Balkan geopolitics and security concerns drove Italy to seek great power status in the Adriatic sea and Crispi viewed a future autonomous Albania within the Ottoman Empire, or an independent one, as a safeguarded for Italian interests. Crispi believed the Albanians' interests against Pan-Slavism and Austro-Hungarian expansion were best served through a Greco-Albanian union and he founded in Rome a philhellenic committee that worked toward that goal. Crispi, after becoming prime minister, stimulated and intensified ethnocultural relations between Italo-Albanians and Albanians of the Balkans, moves which were considered as extending Italian influence over Albanians by Austria-Hungary. To counteract Austro-Hungarian influence in northern Albania, Crispi took the initiative and opened the first Italian schools in Shkodër in 1888. Prominent Albanians involved with the Albanian National Awakening such as Abdyl Frashëri and Thimi Mitko corresponded with Crispi over the Albanian question.

==== Cerruti affair ====
During the conflict between the Italian entrepreneur Ernesto Cerruti and Colombian president Rafael Nuñez Italy mobilized a small naval squadron in 1888 fears were rampant that an Italian armed intervention was imminent on Colombian coasts. Finally, faced with the threat of military intervention and international pressure, the Colombian government opted to submit to international arbitration. In 1891, Pope Leo XIII, who was respected in both countries due to widespread Catholicism, intervened as mediator in the conflict. Under Papal arbitration, an agreement was reached in which Colombia was to pay compensation to Cerruti, although in an amount lower than that originally demanded by Italy.

=== Resignation ===
The general election in 1890 was an extraordinary triumph for Crispi. Out of 508 deputies, 405 sided with the government. But already in October, the first signs of a political crisis grew up. Emperor Menelik had contested the Italian text of the Wuchale Treaty, stating that it did not oblige Ethiopia to be an Italian protectorate. Menelik informed the foreign press and the scandal erupted. A few days after the Finance Minister and Crispi's long-time main political rival, Giovanni Giolitti, abandoned the government.

However, the decisive event was a document published by the new Minister of Finance Bernardino Grimaldi, who revealed that the planned deficit was higher than expected; after that, the government lost its majority with 186 votes against and 123 in favour. Prime Minister Crispi resigned on 6 February 1891.

== After the premiership ==
After the fall of Crispi's government, Umberto I gave the task of forming the new cabinet to the Marquis Antonio Starabba di Rudinì. The government faced many difficulties since the beginning and in May 1892, Giolitti, who became the new Left leader after Crispi's resignation, decided not to support it anymore.

After that, King Umberto I appointed Giolitti as the new prime minister. The first Giolitti cabinet, however, relied on a slender majority and in December 1892 the prime minister was involved in a major scandal.

=== Banca Romana scandal ===
The Banca Romana scandal surfaced in January 1893 in Italy over the bankruptcy of the Banca Romana, one of the six national banks authorised at the time to issue currency. The scandal was the first of many Italian corruption scandals, and, like the others, it discredited the whole political system.

The bank had loaned large sums to property developers but was left with huge liabilities when the real estate bubble collapsed in 1887, but feared that publicity might undermine public confidence and suppressed the report.

Even Umberto I was involved in the scandal and Crispi's reputation emerged greatly strengthened: he could overthrow Giolitti's government at any time or impair the reputation of the King. Giolitti and his allies defended themselves by trying to collect compromising news against Crispi, but the judicial inquiry into the Banca Romana left the latter essentially harmless.

== Return to power and second term ==
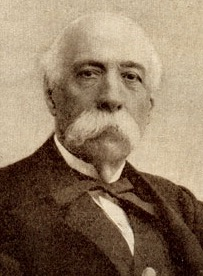
An official portrait of Crispi, during his second term

In December 1893 the impotence of the Giolitti cabinet to restore public order, menaced by disturbances in Sicily and the Banca Romana scandal, gave rise to a general demand that Crispi should return to power.

=== Fasci Siciliani ===
The Fasci Siciliani were a popular movement of democratic and socialist inspiration, which arose in Sicily in the years between 1889 and 1894. The Fasci gained the support of the poorest and most exploited classes of the island by channelling their frustration and discontent into a coherent programme based on the establishment of new rights. Consisting of a jumble of traditionalist sentiment, religiosity, and socialist consciousness, the movement reached its apex in the summer of 1893, when new conditions were presented to the landowners and mine owners of Sicily concerning the renewal of sharecropping and rental contracts.

Upon the rejection of these conditions, there was an outburst of strikes that rapidly spread throughout the island, and was marked by violent social conflict, almost rising to the point of insurrection. The leaders of the movement were not able to keep the situation from getting out of control. The proprietors and landowners asked the government to intervene. Giovanni Giolitti tried to put a halt to the manifestations and protests of the Fasci Siciliani, his measures were relatively mild. On 24 November, Giolitti officially resigned as prime minister. In the three weeks of uncertainty before Crispi formed a government on 15 December 1893, the rapid spread of violence drove many local authorities to defy Giolitti's ban on the use of firearms.

In December 1893, 92 peasants lost their lives in clashes with the police and army. Government buildings were burned along with flour mills and bakeries that refused to lower their prices when taxes were lowered or abolished.

On 3 January 1894, Crispi declared a state of siege throughout Sicily. Army reservists were recalled and General Roberto Morra di Lavriano was dispatched with 40,000 troops. The old order was restored through the use of extreme force, including summary executions. A solidarity revolt of anarchists and republicans in the Lunigiana was crushed as well.

The repression of the Fasci turned into outright persecution. The government arrested not just the leaders of the movement, but masses of poor farmers, students, professionals, sympathizers of the Fasci, and even those simply suspected of having sympathized with the movement at some point in time, in many cases without any evidence for the accusations. After the declaration of a state of emergency, condemnations were issued for the paltriest of reasons. Many rioters were incarcerated for having shouted things such as "Viva l'anarchia" or "down with the King". At Palermo, in April and May 1894, the trials against the central committee of the Fasci took place and this was the final blow that signalled the death knell of the movement of the Fasci Siciliani.

=== Financial crisis and assassination attempt ===
The failed attempt to kill Crispi by the anarchist Paolo Lega on 16 June 1894

Crispi steadily supported the energetic remedies adopted by his Minister of Finance Sidney Sonnino to save Italian credit, which had been severely shaken by the financial crisis of 1892–1893 and the Banca Romana scandal. Sonnino's proposals were harshly criticized both by members of the Left and the Right, causing his resignation on 4 June 1894; on the following day Crispi resigned too, but the King gave him again the task to form a new government.

On 16 June 1894, the anarchist Paolo Lega tried to shoot Crispi but the attempt failed. On 24 June an Italian anarchist killed French President Carnot. In this climate of increased fear of anarchism, Crispi was able to introduce a series of anti-anarchist laws in July 1894, which were also used against socialists. Heavy penalties were announced for "incitement to class hatred" and police received extended powers of preventive arrest and deportation.

The whole parliament expressed solidarity with the Prime Minister who saw his position considerably strengthened. This favoured the approval of the Sonnino law. The reform saved Italy from the crisis and started the way for economic recovery.

=== Giolitti and Cavallotti's accusations ===
In 1894 he was threatened with expulsion from the Masonic Grande Oriente d'Italia for being too friendly towards the Catholic Church. He had previously been strongly anticlerical but had become convinced of the need for rapprochement with the Papacy.

At the end of 1894, his long-time rival Giovanni Giolitti tried to discredit Crispi by submitting to parliament a few documents that were supposed to ruin it. It was actually some old papers attesting loans contracted by Crispi and his wife with the Banca Romana.

Moreover, Crispi's uncompromising suppression of disorder, and his refusal to abandon either the Triple Alliance or the Eritrean colony, or to forsake his Minister of the Treasury, Sidney Sonnino, caused a breach with the radical leader Felice Cavallotti. Cavallotti began a campaign of defamation against him. Cavallotti himself proposed to establish a commission, which should investigate the relations between Crispi and Banca Romana.

On 15 December the commission published its report and this caused some riots in the Chamber. Crispi, in defence of the institutions, submitted to the King a decree to dissolve parliament. On 13 January 1895 Umberto I dissolved the parliament and Giolitti, who was under trial for the bank scandal, was forced to move to Berlin, because his parliamentary immunity expired, and the risk of being arrested.

Giolitti and Cavallotti's attacks were soon renewed more fiercely than ever. They produced little effect and the general election of 1895 gave Crispi a huge majority of 334 seats out of 508. On 25 June 1895, Crispi refused a request to allow a parliamentary inquiry into his role in the Banca Romana scandal, saying as a prime minister he felt he was "invulnerable" because he had "served Italy for 53 years". Despite his majority, Crispi preferred to rule via royal decree instead of getting legislation passed by parliament, leading to concerns about authoritarianism.

=== Mahdist war ===
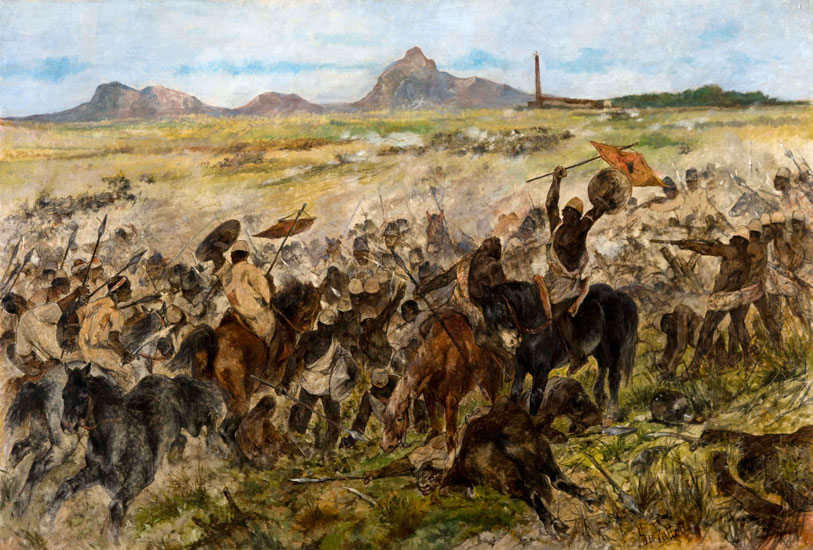
An episode of the Battle of Kassala by Italian painter Giovanni Fattori.

Shortly after he returned to power, Italian Eritrea was invaded by the forces of Mahdist Sudan. The Italian army managed to defeat the Mahdists in the battle of Agordat (21 December 1893). Over 1,000 Dervishes, including the Emir, were killed in the fighting. Crispi then ordered Italian troops to occupy Kassala on July 17, 1894, in order to forestall Mahdist attacks on Eritrea. Those successes consolidated Italian Eritrea and convinced Crispi to attempt a further expansion of the Italian colonial possessions in East Africa.

=== Italo-Ethiopian War and resignation ===
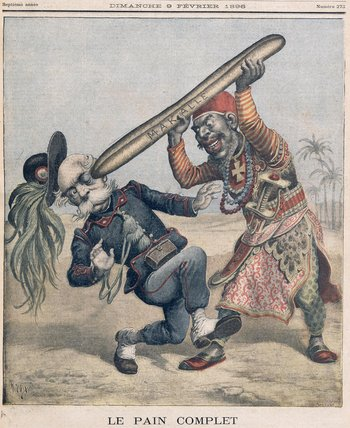
French caricature of Crispi, who suffers the failure of Makallè, by the Ethiopians, aided by French

During his second term, Crispi continued his colonial expansionist policy in East Africa. King Umberto I commented that "Crispi wants to occupy everywhere, even China and Japan". Crispi was strongly supported by the king, who alluding to his personal dislike of him, stated "Crispi is a pig, but a necessary pig", who despite his corruption, had to stay in power for "the national interest, which is the only thing that matters". Crispi took a very belligerent line on foreign policy as he, during a three-month period in 1895, talked quite openly about attacking France, sent a naval squadron to the eastern Mediterranean to prepare for a possible war with the Ottoman Empire in order to seize Albania, wanted to send an expeditionary force to seize a city in China, and planned to send a force to South Africa to forcibly mediate the dispute between Great Britain and the Transvaal Republic. Crispi, who favoured a militant anti-French line, wanted to revise the Triple Alliance as the preamble to the Triple Alliance spoke of preserving peace in Europe while "for Italy, it must be the opposite; for us, the Triple Alliance must mean war!" Those who knew him by this stage of his life considered Crispi to be almost mindlessly bellicose as he broke off diplomatic relations with Portugal over a supposed slight, saying he deserved more respect from this "entirely unimportant country" ruled over by a "minuscule monarchy".

The main event which occurred during his premiership was the First Italo-Ethiopian War, which originated from a disputed treaty which, the Italians claimed, turned Ethiopia into an Italian protectorate. Much to their surprise, they found that Ethiopian ruler Menelik II, rather than opposed by some of his traditional enemies, was supported by them, and so the Italian army, invading Ethiopia from Italian Eritrea in 1893, faced a more united front than they expected. In addition, Ethiopia was supported by Russia with the sale of weapons and medical assistance. France supported Ethiopia diplomatically in order to prevent Italy from becoming a colonial competitor.

Full-scale war broke out in 1895, with Italian troops under the command of General Oreste Baratieri having initial success until Ethiopian troops counterattacked Italian positions and besieged the Italian fort of Meqele, forcing its surrender. In April 1895, Crispi withdrew part of the Italian army from Ethiopia to save money. He told General Baratieri that if he needed more money to just impose more taxes on the Ethiopians and "copy Napoleon who made war with the money of those he conquered". Crispi did not understand that Ethiopia was a poor country and the money necessary to sustain a modern army could not possibly be raised from taxing the Ethiopians, causing major problems for the Italian Army in Ethiopia. Through Crispi fought the war against Ethiopia on the cheap, he secretly used public money to bribe journalists to write pro-war articles in the Italian newspapers while those foreign journalists who reported critically about the war were expelled from Italy. Italian newspapers that reported critically about the war with Ethiopia were heavily fined by the Crispi government with the offending editions of the papers being burned under the grounds that it was "unpatriotic" to criticize the government in wartime.

On 22 February 1896, Umberto dismissed General Baratieri as commander of the Italian expeditionary force, ordering him to remain in command until his successor arrived. On 25 February Crispi sent a telegram to Baratieri veiledly accusing him of cowardice and incompetence by engaging in small skirmishes and avoiding decisive battles ("[yours] is not so much a war, but the military version of consumptive disease"), and ended with demanding he took decisive action "whatever the cost to save the honour of the army and the prestige of the monarchy". In response to Crispi's telegram, on the evening of 29 February Baratieri met with his brigadier generals and with their support decided to ignore his own doubts and attacked a much larger Ethiopian force on 1 March 1896 near Adwa. In the Battle of Adwa the Ethiopian army dealt the heavily outnumbered Italians a decisive loss and forced their retreat back into Eritrea. General Baratieri took no responsibility for the defeat, blaming the government for providing very little supplies and pressuring him to go on the offensive. A remark by Baratieri hinting at the cowardice of his men was even published in Rome. By contrast, the British military observer stated the ordinary Italian soldiers at Adwa "were as good as fighting material as can be found in Europe", but they had been let down by their officers who had shown no leadership abilities whatsoever.

The casualty rate suffered by Italian forces at the Battle of Adwa was greater than any other major European battle of the 19th century, beyond even the Napoleonic Era's Waterloo and Eylau. More Italians were killed in one day's fighting at Adwa than in all the wars of the Risorgimento. Crispi announced after Adwa that he planned to continue the war against the "barbarians" of Ethiopia, and would be sending more troops to the Horn of Africa, which prompted a public backlash against the unpopular war. After the humiliating defeat of the Italian army, riots broke out in several Italian cities, and within two weeks, the Crispi government collapsed amidst Italian disenchantment with "foreign adventures". In Rome, people demonstrated under the slogans "death to the king!" and "long live the republic!" as the war had badly damaged the prestige of Umberto who had backed Crispi so forcefully and strongly. Crispi was opposed to making peace with Ethiopia, saying he regarded it as humiliating for the Italians to make peace with Ethiopia, he even confronted Umberto for criticizing his colonial policy; stating that "you cannot escape being answerable before history" claiming that history would condemn a ruler who had failed to punish the "barbarians" of Africa, as even the "little king of Belgium" was capable of such an act.

== Downfall and death ==
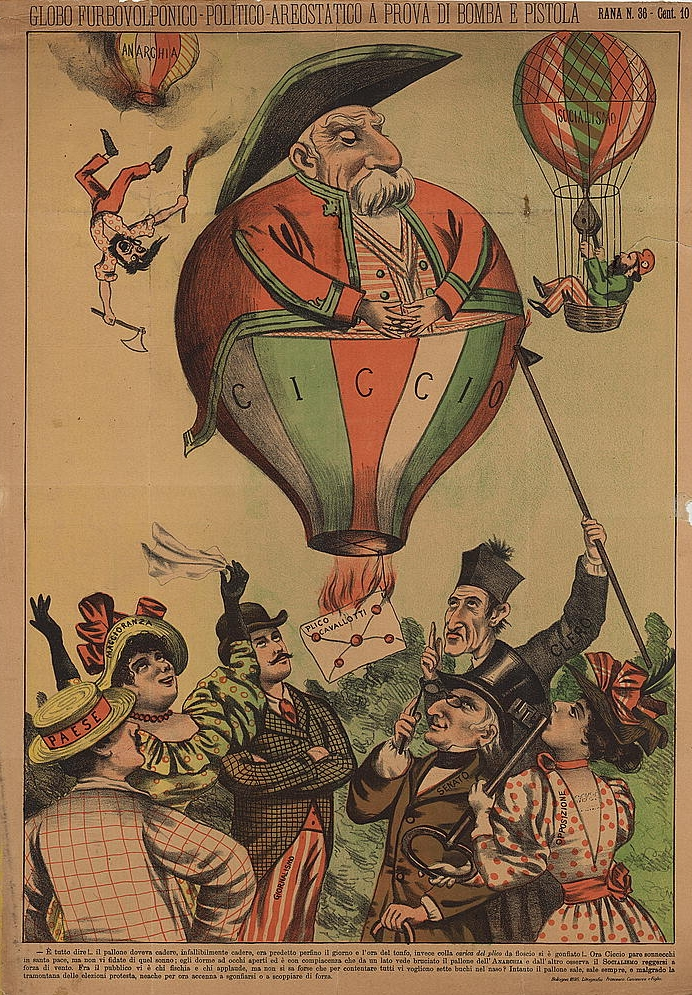
Caricature of Crispi shown as a balloon Ciccio (fat) hovering above a group of men and women representing the country

The ensuing Antonio di Rudini cabinet lent itself to Cavallotti's campaign, and at the end of 1897, the judicial authorities applied to the Chamber of Deputies for permission to prosecute Crispi for embezzlement. A parliamentary commission of inquiry discovered only that Crispi, on assuming office in 1893, had found the secret service coffers empty, and had borrowed money from a state bank to fund it, repaying it with the monthly instalments granted in regular course by the treasury. The commission, considering this proceeding irregular, proposed, and the Chamber adopted, a vote of censure, but refused to authorize a prosecution.

Crispi resigned his seat in parliament, but was re-elected by an overwhelming majority in April 1898 by his Palermo constituents. For some time he took little part in active politics, chiefly on account of his growing blindness. A successful operation for cataract restored his eyesight in June 1900, and notwithstanding his 81 years, he resumed to some extent his former political activity.

Soon afterwards, however, his health began to give way and he died in Naples on 11 August 1901; according to many witnesses, his last words were: "Before closing my eyes to life, I would have the supreme comfort of knowing that our homeland is beloved and defended by all its sons".

== Legacy ==
Crispi was a colourful and intensely patriotic character. He was a man of enormous energy but with a violent temper. His whole life, public and private, was turbulent, dramatic and marked by a succession of bitter personal hostilities. According to some Crispi's "fiery pride, almost insane touchiness and indifference to sound methods of government" were due to his Albanian inheritance. Although he began life as a revolutionary and democratic figure, his premiership was authoritarian and he showed disdain for Italian liberals. He was born as a firebrand and died as a firefighter. At the end of the 19th century, Crispi was the dominant figure of Italian politics for a decade. He was saluted by Giuseppe Verdi as 'the great patriot'. He was a more scrupulous statesman than Cavour, a more realistic conspirator than Mazzini, and a more astute figure than Garibaldi. His death resulted in lengthier obituaries in Europe's press than for any Italian politician since Cavour.

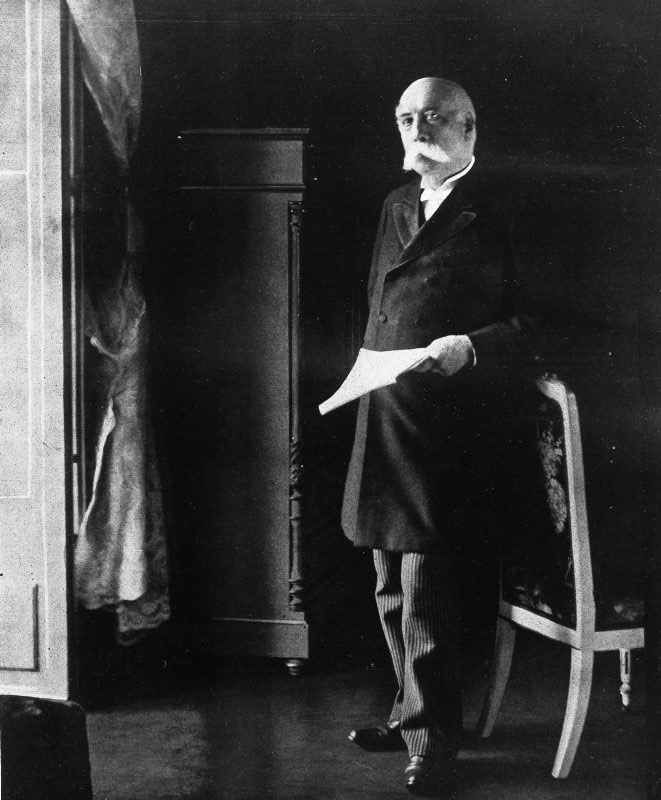
Crispi during his last years

As prime minister in the 1880s and 1890s, Crispi was internationally famous and often mentioned along with world statesmen such as Bismarck, Gladstone and Salisbury. Originally an enlightened Italian patriot and democratic liberal, he went on to become a bellicose authoritarian prime minister and ally and admirer of Bismarck. He is often seen as a precursor of Benito Mussolini. Mussolini portrayed the Liberal era (1861–1922) as a perversion of the idealist vision of Mazzini and Garibaldi, and Crispi was the lone prime minister of the Liberal era whom Il Duce depicted in favourable terms. In particular, Mussolini praised Crispi as the inventor of "Italian imperialism" as opposed to "western imperialism", presenting his foreign policy as the inspiration for Fascist foreign policy, and the period after 1896 was excoriated as a period of decline caused by the alleged pusillanimous policy of Giolitti. Mussolini presented his foreign policies such as conquering Ethiopia to "avenge Adawa" and making an alliance with Nazi Germany as a continuation of Crispi's foreign policy who likewise tried to conquer Ethiopia and made an alliance with the German Empire. His reputation was a victim of Italian Fascism, which awarded him an abundance of street names, most erased after 1945. With the collapse of Fascism, Crispi's reputation was left fatally tarnished.

Historian R.J.B. Bosworth says that Crispi

pursued policies whose openly aggressive character would not be equaled until the days of the Fascist regime. Crispi increased military expenditure, talked cheerfully of a European conflagration, and alarmed his German or British friends with this suggestions of preventative attacks on his enemies. His policies were ruinous, both for Italy's trade with France, and, more humiliatingly, for colonial ambitions in East Africa. Crispi's lust for territory there was thwarted when on 1 March 1896, the armies of Ethiopian Emperor Menelik routed Italian forces at Adowa ... In what has been defined as an unparalleled disaster for a modern army. Crispi, whose private life (he was perhaps a trigamist) and personal finances...were objects of perennial scandal, went into dishonorable retirement.

== Authored books ==
- (1862) Ricorso del Collegio di Maria di Mezzojuso in provincia di Palermo al Consiglio di stato. Turin: Tip. del Diritto diretta da C. Bianchi.
- (1865) Repubblica e monarchia: a Giuseppe Mazzini. Turin: V. Vercellino.
- (1890) Crispi per un antico parlamentare. Rome: E. Perino.
- (1890) Cronistoria Frammenti. Rome: Unione cooperativa editrice.

== Sources ==
- Bosworth, R.J.B. (2013). Italy and the Wider World: 1860–1960. New York: Routledge. ISBN 0-415-13477-3.
- Chicco, Gianni (1982). "Crispi and the Question of the Tripolitanian Borders 1887-1888". East European Quarterly. 16 (2): 137–149. ISSN 0012-8449.
- Dakin, Douglas (1968). "Lavagnini Grecia 1859 nel diario di Francesco Crispi. In appendice: Cavour sulla Grecia 1860 e altri scritti, (1st Siciliano di studi bizantini e neoellenici, quaderni, 4.) Palermo: Istituto Siciliano di Studi Bizantini e Neoellenici. 1967". The Journal of Hellenic Studies. 88: 264–265. doi:10.2307/628796. JSTOR 628796.
- Duggan, Christopher (2002a). "Nation-building in 19th-century Italy: The Case of Francesco Crispi". History Today. Vol. 52, no. 2. London. pp. 9–18. ISSN 0018-2753.
- —— (2002b). Francesco Crispi, 1818–1901: From Nation to Nationalism. Oxford: Oxford University Press. doi:10.1093/acprof:oso/9780198206118.001.0001. ISBN 0-19-820611-9.
- —— (2011). "Francesco Crispi's relationship with Britain: from admiration to disillusionment". Modern Italy. 16 (4): 427–436. doi:10.1080/13532944.2011.611226. ISSN 1353-2944.
- Fonzi, Fausto (1984). "Crispi, Francesco". In Ghisalberti, Alberto Maria (ed.). Dizionario Biografico degli Italiani (in Italian). Vol. 30. Rome: Istituto della Enciclopedia italiana. pp. 779–799. ISBN 9788812000326 – via Treccani.it.
- Gilmour, David (1 June 2002). "The Randolph Churchill of Italy". The Spectator. p. 44. Review of Christopher Duggan's Francesco Crispi, 1818–1901.
- —— (2011). The Pursuit of Italy: A History of a Land, its Regions and their Peoples. London: Penguin UK. ISBN 978-0-14-192989-7.
- Kallis, Aristotle A. (2000). Fascist Ideology: Territory and Expansionism in Italy and Germany, 1922–1945. London: Routledge. ISBN 978-0-415-21611-1.
- Kohn, George Childs, ed. (2001). Encyclopedia of Plague and Pestilence: From Ancient Times to the Present. New York: Facts on File. ISBN 0-8160-4263-2.
- Mack Smith, Denis (1989). Italy and Its Monarchy. New Haven: Yale University Press. ISBN 0-300-05132-8.
- —— (1997) [First published 1959, revised ed. 1969]. Modern Italy: a political history (New ed.). New Haven, CN: Yale University Press. ISBN 978-0-300-07377-5.
- Rao, John (2004). "Secular Italy and Catholicism: 1848–1915]". In Varacalli, Joseph A.; et al. (eds.). Models and Images of Catholicism in Italian Americana: Academy and Society. Stony Brook, NY: Forum Italicum. pp. 195–230. ISBN 1893127249.
- Ricci, Aldo G.; Montevecchi, Luisa, eds. (2009). Francesco Crispi: costruire lo Stato per dare forma alla Nazione (PDF) (in Italian). Rome: Ministero per i beni e le attività culturali, Direzione generale per gli archivi. ISBN 9788871253015. Archived from the original (PDF) on 6 October 2020.
- Sarti, Roland (2004). Italy: A Reference Guide from the Renaissance to the Present. New York: Facts on File. ISBN 0-81607-474-7.
- Seton-Watson, Christopher (1967). Italy from Liberalism to Fascism, 1870–1925. New York: Taylor & Francis. ISBN 0-416-18940-7.
- Scichilone, Giorgio (2012). Francesco Crispi (in Italian). Palermo: Flaccovio. ISBN 978-88-780-4349-7.
- Skendi, Stavro (1967). The Albanian National Awakening: 1878–1912. Princeton, NJ: Princeton University Press. ISBN 9780691650029.
- Snowden, Frank M. (1995). Naples in the Time of Cholera, 1884–1911. Cambridge: Cambridge University Press. ISBN 978-0-585-13106-1.
- Stillman, William James (1899). Francesco Crispi: Insurgent, Exile, Revolutionist and Statesman. London: Grant Richards.
- Vandervort, Bruce (1998). Wars Of Imperial Conquest In Africa, 1830-1914. London: Taylor & Francis. ISBN 1-85728-486-0.
- White, Elizabeth Brett (1917). The Foreign Policy of Francesco Crispi (PhD thesis). University of Wisconsin–Madison.
- Wright, Patricia (1972). Conflict on the Nile: the Fashoda incident of 1898. London: Heinemann. ISBN 978-0-434-87830-7.
