= Giuseppe Ferlito =

Italian film director

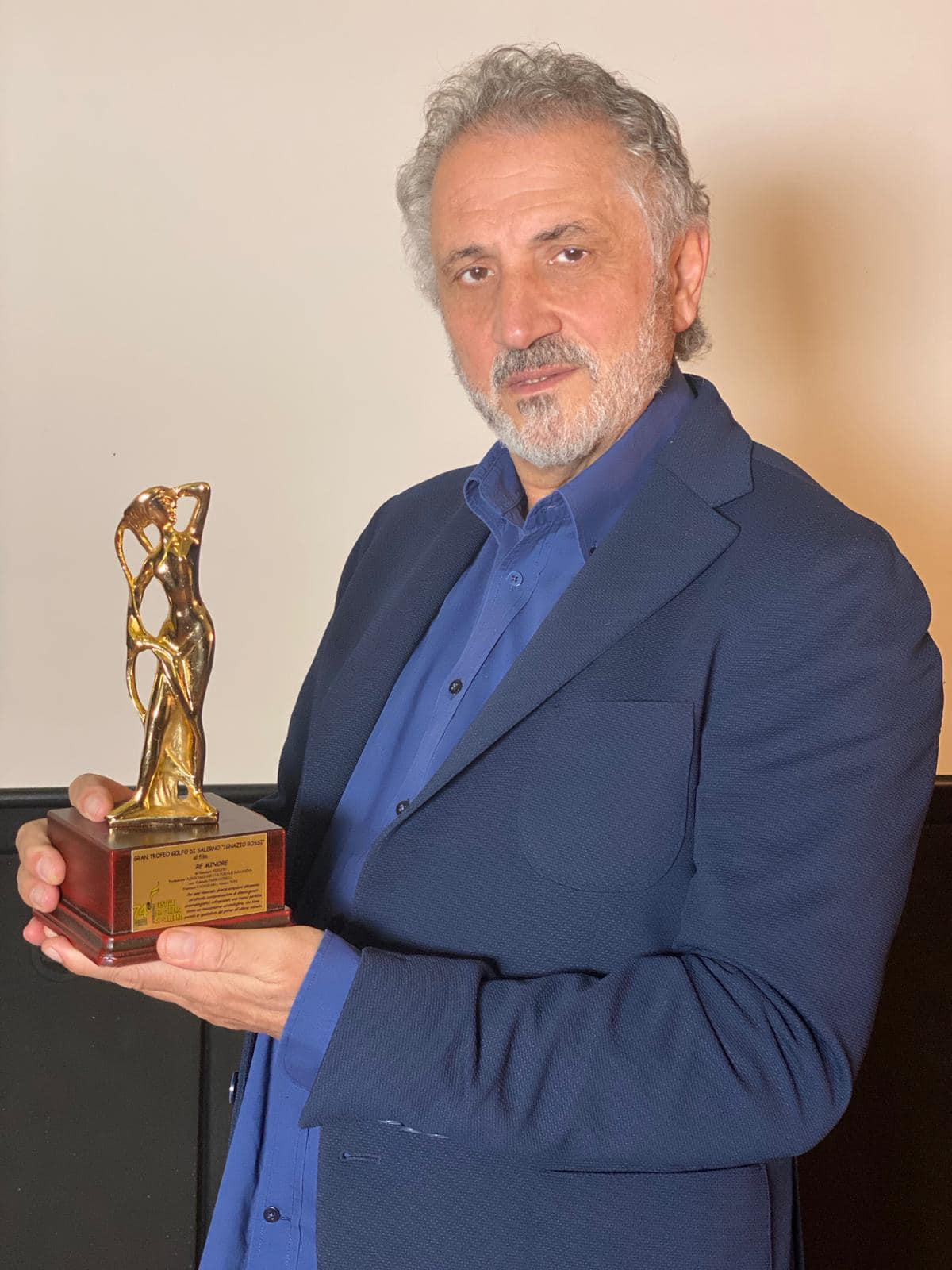
Ferlito receiving an award

Giuseppe Ferlito is an Italian film director. He was born on 24 October 1954 in the Sicilian town of Burgio.

== Early career ==
In 1981, Ferlito attended the Workshop Theater of Vittorio Gassman which follows the course dramaturgy of Eduardo De Filippo, participating in the drafting of the text "Simpatia"" published by Einaudi. In 1989 Ferlito directed the feature film Repercussion in video. In 1989 Ferlito directed Backlash also a feature film in video. "Special prize of the jury" and "Prize for the better masculine interpretation" at the 40th International Show of Montecatini. "Gull of gold" for best feature film at the Festival of Bellaria.

== Later career ==
In 1994 in Florence he founded the school of cinema Imagine, (La di Cinema Immagina) of which he is the artistic director and where he teaches acting, directing, screenplay and editing. In 1998 it realizes in quality of producer the mediometraggio in 35 mm.

In 1997, he directed the short film Doppio Petto in Sicily. It was produced in association with Imagine and with the contribution of the Communes of Burgio and Villafranca Sicula. The film won awards at the National Competition FEDIC and the World Competition SOLE 1998 held in Austria.

In 1998 he directed the film Female, produced and distributed from Cecchi Channels Group, and starring Monica Guerritore and Roberto Farnesi.

In 2001 he directed the feature film Né terra né cielo, financed by the Italian Ministry of Cultural Assets. It was co-produced by Imagine Film Productions and Arbash. This film also received awards at European Film Festivals.

In 2008 he directed La verità negli occhi starring Roberto Farnese and the pupils of the film drama school Imagine.

== Films directed ==
- 1997 – Doppio Petto
- 1998 – Femmina
- 2000 – I Prigioni – medium length film –
- 2001 – Né terra né cielo
- 2003 – La mia squadra del cuore
- 2006 – Ritratti nella notte
- 2007 – Cobret – medium length film –
- 2007 – Nero di Seppia – short –
- 2008 – Big bang Prodi – short –
- 2008 – La verità negli occhi – medium length film –
- 2015 – Infernet
- 2019 – Re Minore
