= Lucca Sicula =

Lucca Sicula Lucca Sìcula
- Comune
- Comune di Lucca Sicula
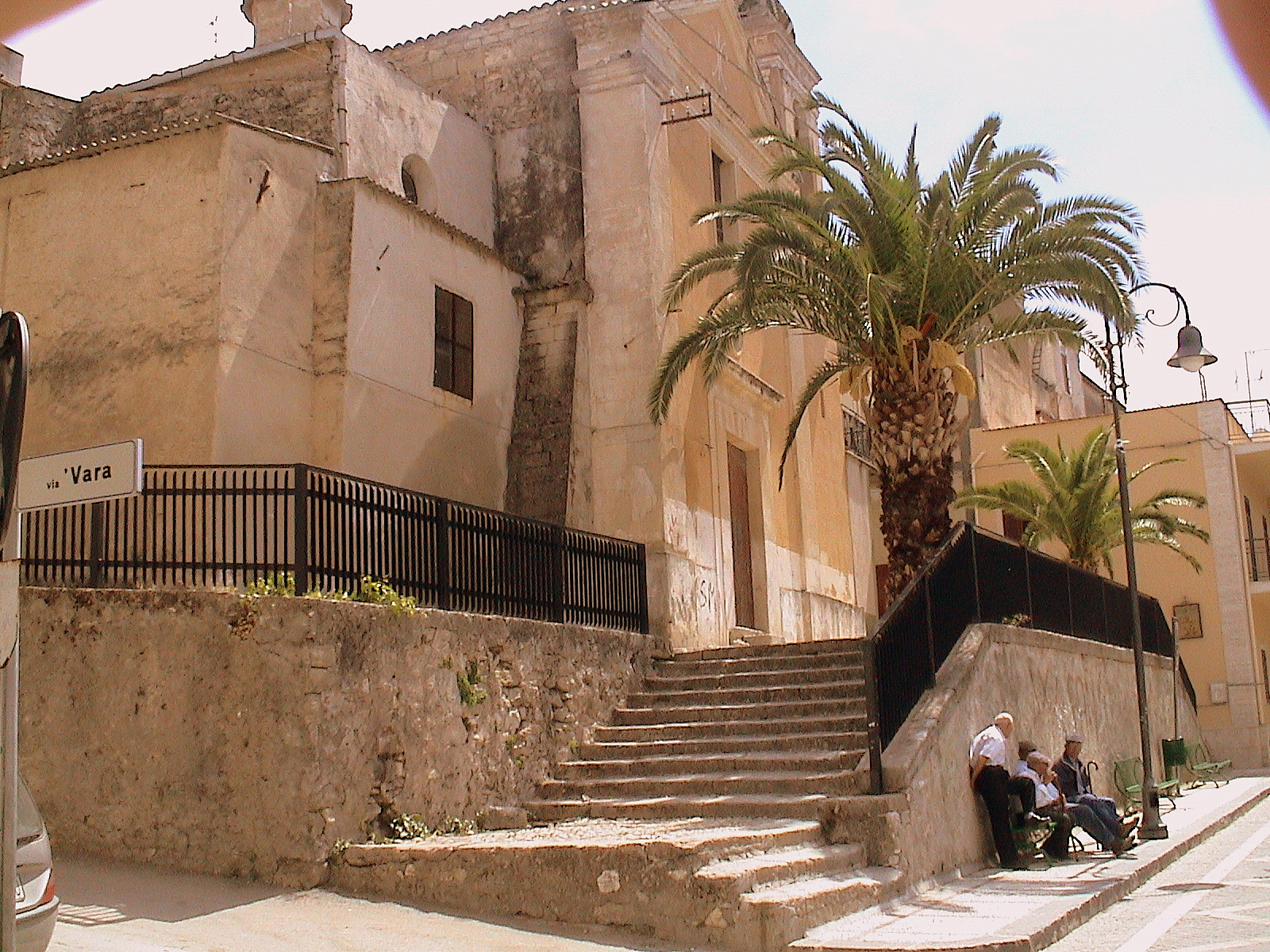
- View of Lucca Sicula

- Coat of arms

- Location within Italy Location within Sicily
- Coordinates: 37°35′N 13°18′E
- Country: Italy
- Region: Sicily
- Province: Agrigento (AG)

Government
  - Mayor: Salvatore Dazzo

Area
  - Total: 18.4 km^{2} (7.1 sq mi)
- Elevation: 513 m (1,683 ft)

Population (31 December 2008)
  - Total: 1,939
  - Density: 105/km^{2} (273/sq mi)
- Demonym: Lucchesi
- Time zone: UTC+1 (CET)
  - Summer (DST): UTC+2 (CEST)
- Postal code: 92010
- Dialing code: 0925
- Website: Official website

Lucca Sicula (Sicilian: Lucca Sìcula) is an Italian comune (municipality) founded in 1621. Located in the Province of Agrigento in Sicily, it is about 60 kilometres (37 mi) south of Palermo and about 40 kilometres (25 mi) northwest of Agrigento.

Lucca Sicula borders the following municipalities: Bivona, Burgio, Calamonaci, Palazzo Adriano, Villafranca Sicula. It is located in the lower Verdura river valley, and is connected only through a twisting, poor provincial road.

The main activity is agriculture, with production of olive oil and oranges.

== Twin towns – sister cities ==
- Pueblo, United States
- Lucca, Italy
