= Rose Montmasson =

Italian patriot (1823–1904)

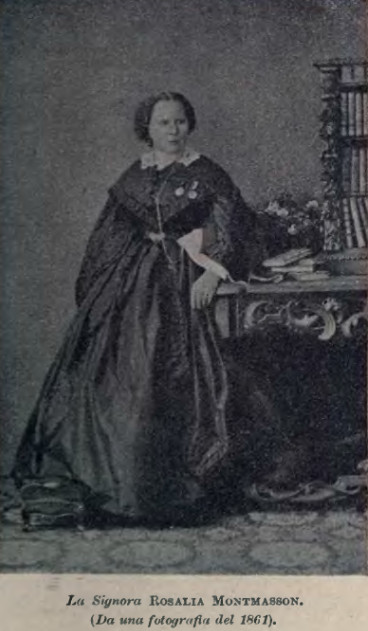
- Born: Rose Montmasson; January 12, 1823; Saint-Jorioz, Kingdom of Sardinia
- Died: November 10, 1904 (aged 81); Rome, Kingdom of Italy
- Occupations: Political activist; courier; nurse
- Known for: Political activism during the unification of Italy

Rose Montmasson (January 12, 1823 – November 10, 1904), also known as Rosalia Montmasson, was an Italian patriot. Born in Savoy, Montmasson contributed to the unification of Italy and was notably the only woman to openly participate in Giuseppe Garibaldi's Expedition of the Thousand, both as a nurse and as a soldier.

== Biography ==
Montmasson was born in Haute-Savoie, then part of the Kingdom of Sardinia, in 1823. The daughter of a landed farmer, she was part of a large family and received an elementary education. She worked in the fields with her family until the age of 15, when the death of her mother prompted her to find work abroad. Though much of her early work history is unknown, she lived in Marseille and later in Turin. At some point she met and became a companion of Francesco Crispi, an exiled political activist who moved from city to city; according to some sources, the couple met in 1849 while Crispi was imprisoned in Turin, while others note that the two might have previously met in Marseille. The couple's early relationship was strained by Crispi still being attached to a former lover and having been married once before, but nevertheless Montmasson joined Crispi when he was exiled from Turin and moved to Malta.

While on Malta, both Crispi and Montmasson became increasingly involved with the disparate political community on the island, which was made up of a number of people exiled from the Italian mainland. The couple were married in 1854 (albeit with some resistance from Crispi) and would later depart for London, making a stop in Savoie to visit the Montmasson family. Once in London, the couple would become strong advocates for Italian unification, going so far as to travel to continental Europe to gather support for the cause. During this time, Montmasson would smuggle messages, supplies, and weapons to various pro-unification committees inside Italy.

In 1860, Montmasson travelled to Sicily in preparation for the arrival of Rosolino Pilo and Giuseppe Garibaldi, who planned to start an uprising against the Bourbon-ruled Kingdom of the Two Sicilies. Montmasson moved throughout the countryside, gathering support for the imminent uprising. She then returned to Genoa in time for the Expedition of the Thousand, thus becoming the only woman to openly join the expedition's forces. During the ensuing fighting, she provided valuable intelligence on the island of Sicily and served as a nurse, earning the nickname of the "Angelo di Calatafimi" after the Battle of Calatafimi.

Following the successful unification of Italy, Montmasson moved with her husband as he rapidly became a major political figure in the new nation. They lived in Turin and later Florence, where the couple lived in comfort. However, by the 1870s Montmasson's marriage had become increasingly strained, and in 1874 she moved out of the family household and ended her relationship with Crispi a year later. She would later be granted an annuity, though the marriage was not officially annulled until Crispi (after remarrying) was accused of bigamy in a major political scandal.

Montmasson lived a quiet life after her separation from Crispi, "surrounded by cats and dedicated to embroidery" according to one source. She suffered a stroke in August 1904 and died in Rome. She was – at her request – buried in a red shirt, the traditional attire for members of the Expedition of the Thousand.

== Cultural depictions ==
A statue was unveiled in 2011 in Ribera, Sicily, depicting Rosalia Montmasson and Italian politician Francesco Crispi. The statue was designed by Italian sculptor Salvatore Rizzuti; it represents the two life-sized figures in bronze, as a way to celebrate both political activists and their actions to join Sicily to the Kingdom of Italy.

In 2018, Maria Attanasio published the first and only biography on Rosalia Montmasson, called La Ragazza di Marsiglia, only available in Italian.
