= Ferlito =

Ferlito is an Italian family name, and may refer to:

- Carlotta Ferlito (born 1995), Italian gymnast
- Giuseppe Ferlito (born 1954), Italian film director
- Vanessa Ferlito (born 1980), American actress

== See also ==
- Team Ferlito, an Italian auto racing team
