= Anguilla necropolis =

Archaeological site in Agrigento Province, Sicily

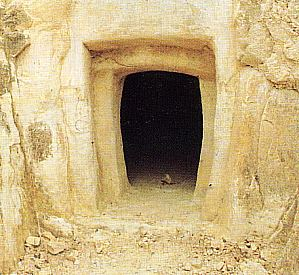

The Anguilla necropolis (Italian: necropolis Anguilla) is an archaeological site in the Italian comune of Ribera in the province of Agrigento in Sicily.

== Description ==
The necropolis dates from the middle and late Bronze Age (13th century BC) and was discovered in 1982. It is located to the south of the town of Ribera.

It consists of two types of tombs: artificial caves and chambers. Some are accessed through a 1.5-5 metre long corridor called a "dromos", located in front of the tomb itself. The tombs consist of one or two chambers with a corbel vaulted dome (tholos) containing a platform with the corpse and votive offerings (vases, rings, arms, tools) on it.

The dimensions and typology of these tombs are unique in western Sicily.

== Bibliography ==
- Touring Club Italiano, ed. (1990). Sicilia. Touring Editore. p. 380. ISBN 978-88-365-0350-6.
- Istituto Gramsci siciliano (1986). Istituto per la storia e l'archeologia della Magna Grecia (ed.). Traffici micenei nel Mediterraneo: problemi storici e documentazione archeologica. Taranto.
