= Giuseppe Crispi =

Italian priest and philologist (1781–1859)

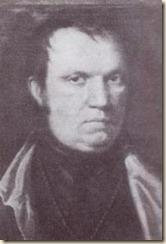
Giuseppe Crispi

Giuseppe Crispi (Arbërisht: Zef Krispi; 30 July 1781 – 10 September 1859) was an Italian philologist and bishop of Arbëresh descent. One of the major figures of the Arbëresh community of Sicily of that era, he wrote a number of works on the Albanian language. His nephew, Francesco was the Prime Minister of Italy in the late 19th century.

== Life ==
Born on 30 July 1781 in Palazzo Adriano to the Crispi family, he studied at the seminary of Palermo, under Nicola Chetta. Francesco, son of his brother Tommaso, served as Prime Minister of Italy in 1887–91 and 1893-6. On 26 May 1808 Giuseppe Crispi was ordained as an Eastern Catholic priest. He was a professor of ancient Greek literature at the University of Palermo, a rector of the seminary of Palermo and a ritual bishop of Lampsaco from 1836, when he succeeded Francesco Chiarchiaro, also from Palazzo Adriano, to his death on 10 September 1859. In Palermo, a street has been named in his honour (via Giuseppe Crispi).

Crispi's best-known work is Memorie sulla lingua Albanese, first published in 1831 in Palermo. Partially influenced by Conrad Malte-Brun's studies, it constitutes the first monograph on the Albanian language. Crispi considered Albanian closely related to Pelasgian, Phrygian, Macedonian and "proto-Aeolian", thus an "ancestor" of Greek, which according to him had lost its "ancient features" over the millennia. The monograph influenced other Arbëreshë authors like Giuseppe Schiro, who first possibly used it as a point of reference in his 1834 paper Rapporti tra l'Epiro e il Regno delle due Sicilie. His other publications include works on the Arbëreshë communities of Sicily and various textbooks.
