= Paolo Lega =

Italian anarchist

- Born: December 9, 1868; Lugo, Italy
- Died: September 25, 1896 (aged 27); Cagliari, Italy
- Known for: Attempted assassination of Francesco Crispi

Illustration of the assassination attempt

Paolo Lega (1868–1896), also known as Marat, was an Italian anarchist who attempted to assassinate the prime minister, Francesco Crispi.
