= Burgio =

Burgio Pýrgos (Greek)
- Comune
- Comune di Burgio
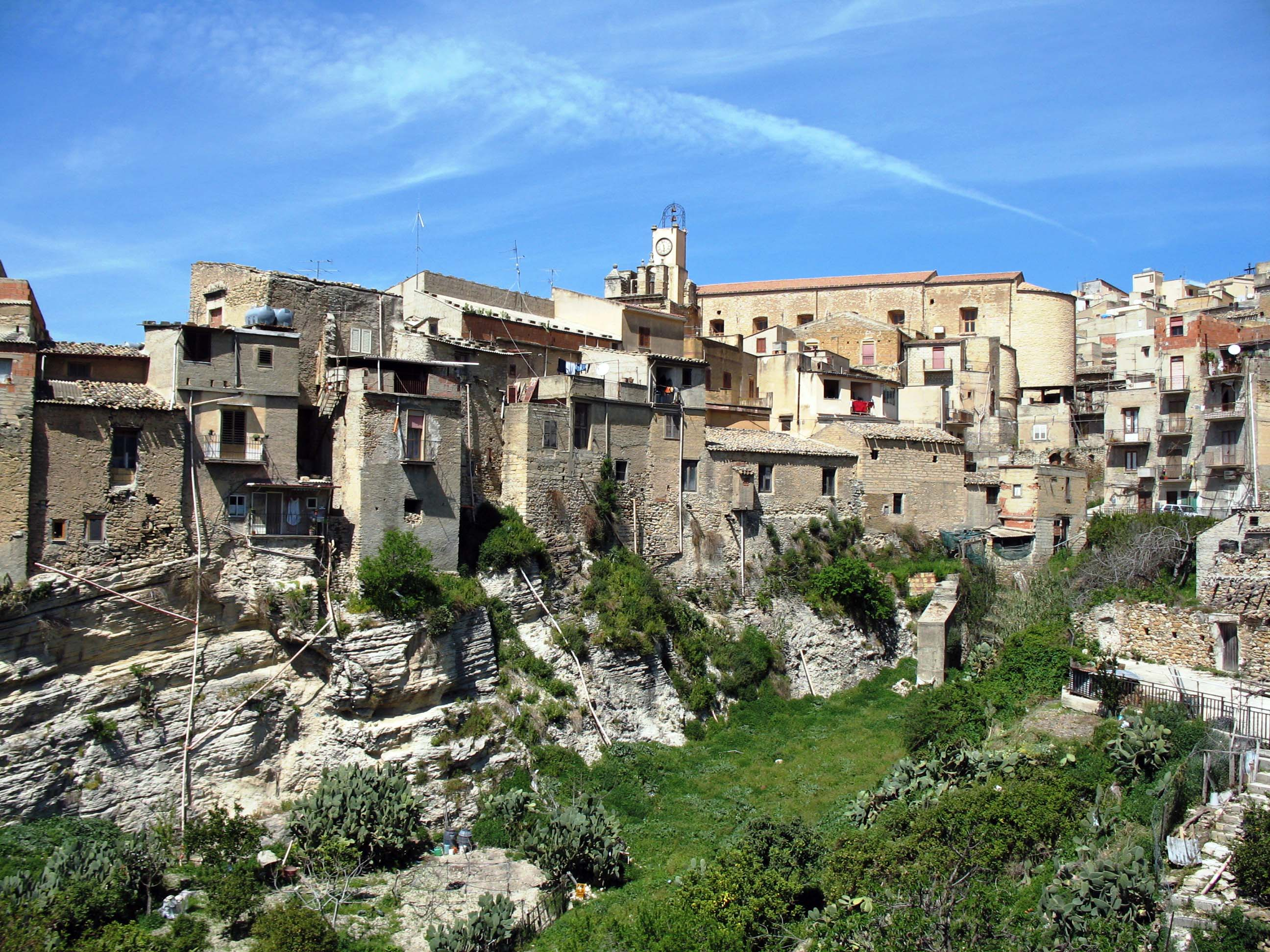
- View of Burgio

- Location within Italy Location within Sicily
- Coordinates: 37°36′N 13°17′E
- Country: Italy
- Region: Sicily
- Province: Agrigento (AG)

Government
  - Mayor: Vito Ferrantelli

Area
  - Total: 42.2 km^{2} (16.3 sq mi)
- Elevation: 317 m (1,040 ft)

Population (31 December 2013)
  - Total: 2,740
  - Density: 64.9/km^{2} (168/sq mi)
- Demonym: Burgitani
- Time zone: UTC+1 (CET)
  - Summer (DST): UTC+2 (CEST)
- Postal code: 92010
- Dialing code: 0925
- Patron saint: St. Anthony the Abbot
- Website: Official website

Burgio (Sicilian: Burgiu) is a comune (municipality) in the Province of Agrigento in the Italian region Sicily, located about 60 kilometres (37 mi) south of Palermo and about 40 kilometres (25 mi) northwest of Agrigento.

Burgio borders the following municipalities: Caltabellotta, Chiusa Sclafani, Lucca Sicula, Palazzo Adriano, Villafranca Sicula.

== History ==
The exact date of the founding of Burgio is not known. However, it is known that it already existed in the 14th century, when the inhabitants of the nearby Scirtea joined those of Burgio. The first sultan of Burgio was Ali Bin Chema (King Amir, of the Idrisid dynasty), who left his kingdom in inheritance to Hamud. Hamud lost his kingdom in 1087 during the war against Roger I of Sicily. In 1282 Burgio's mayor was among several mayors invited to the Sicilian parliament by Peter I of Aragon, King of Sicily.

== Main sights ==
- Baronial Castle
- Virgadamo Bell Foundry
- Ceramic Museum of Burgio - MUCIB
- Museum of Mummies
- Mother Church, standing in the highest part of the town. Dedicated to St. Anthony the Abbot (the patron saint), it was built in the 12th century and restored in the 14th century. It has a Renaissance external portal on the left side, with a lunette niche with a statue of the Madonna with Child, surrounded by small saints. Inside the church, in the chapel dedicated to the Madonna of Trapani, is a 16th-century statue of Madonna with Child by Vincenzo Gagini. The walls of the building are entirely decorated with stuccoes. The church is also home to a large wooden crucifix dating from the 13th century.
- Church of San Rocco
- Church of San Giuseppe
- Church of San Vito
- Church of San Luca
