= Ribera, Agrigento =

Ribera
- Comune
- Comune di Ribera
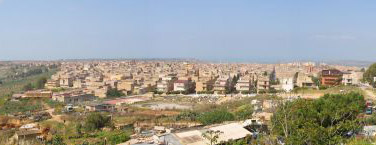
- Panorama of Ribera

- Coat of arms

- Position of the municipality of Ribera in the free municipal consortium of Agrigento

- Location within Italy Location within Sicily
- Coordinates: 37°29′58″N 13°15′54″E
- Country: Italy
- Region: Sicily
- Province: Agrigento (AG)
- Frazioni: Borgo Bonsignore, Seccagrande

Government
  - Mayor: Matteo Ruvolo

Area
  - Total: 118.52 km^{2} (45.76 sq mi)
- Elevation: 223 m (732 ft)

Population (30 November 2025)
  - Total: 17,739
  - Density: 149.67/km^{2} (387.65/sq mi)
- Demonym: Riberesi
- Time zone: UTC+1 (CET)
  - Summer (DST): UTC+2 (CEST)
- Postal code: 92016
- Dialing code: 0925
- Patron saint: St. Nicholas
- Saint day: December 6
- Website: Official website

Ribera (Sicilian: Rivela) is a comune in the province of Agrigento, Region of Sicily, southern Italy, between the Verdura and Magazzolo valleys in the so-called Plain of San Nicola.

== Physical Geography ==
=== Territory ===
The town is connected by the S.S. 115 (state road), leading from Trapani to Syracuse. The Platani River, the third Sicilian river, flows nearby. It has enormously contributed to developing both farming and tourism in the area. Its mouth has been designated as a natural reserve.

The municipal area stands on mostly clayey soils of the plastic complex of the lower-middle Miocene period surmounted by the lithotypes of the gypsum-sulphur formation, there are also marl (rock) calcareous and marly clays of the lower Pliocene, ashy clayey marls and contemporary clayey breccias of the middle-upper Pliocene, calcarenites of the Pleistocene. The marine terraces are from the Quaternary-Upper Pleistocene.

With its 350 mt. above sea level, Mount Sara located in the north-east of the territory is the only significant relief..

=== Climate ===
The constant throughout these areas is a "Mediterranean" climate, with average temperatures of 26-28°C in July and August and highs of 30-32°C. Climate classification: zone C, 974 days..

== History ==
The comune probably rose on the site of the ancient Allava, to which the Byzantine necropolis near the modern town may possibly be attributed. In 1627, Luigi Guglielmo Moncada, Prince of Paternò, founded a new centre named after his wife, Maria Alfan di Ribera; the new centre developed rapidly, thanks to the fertility of the soil and the accessibility of the area..

According to the deed of notary Vincenzo Scoma, kept in the State Archives of Sciacca, Ribera's official birth date is February 25, 1636. In the decade between 1640 and 1650, Ribera's population more than doubled, reaching 496 people. Thus, in 1655 the town had its first church, dedicated to Saint Nicholas and later to Saint Antonino.

=== 19th century ===
In 1841, the municipality, with a production of 5,000 quintals of rice, was classified as the leading rice-producing center in Sicily. Despite the deaths caused by cholera, the abundance of labor encouraged marriages and the growth of the population, which numbered approximately 5,000. On September 29 of that year, through a royal decree, the municipality was elevated to a third-class magistrate's court.

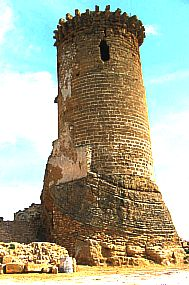
A Tower of Castello di Poggio Diana.

== Monuments and places of interest ==
- The Chiesa Madre, founded in the 18th century, facing the Piazza Duomo ("Cathedral Square").
- The Town Hall (19th century) is in the same square.
- In Via Crispi is the house where Francesco Crispi Prime Minister o Kingdom of Italy for six years, from 1887 to 1891 and again from 1893 to 1896 was born.
- The Garibaldi Garden offers a botanical itinerary.

Just outside the town, on a gorge overlooking the Verdura river is the Castello di Poggio Diana, a military architecture built by Guglielmo Peralta in the 14th century.

A Bronze Age necropolis (13th century BC), the Anguilla necropolis, was discovered near the town. It includes some 30 tombs in two types, "chamber"- or "grotto"-like; some are preceded by a corridor up to 4 metres (13 ft) long.

Also outside the town is the Borgo Bonsignore, a village founded under Fascism as part of the "colonization" policy that encouraged the creation of new villages; it has now grown as a summer resort.

== Culture ==
=== Library ===
The "Antonio Gramsci" Municipal Library is located on Via Don Minzoni, on the first floor.

=== Schools ===
The city has five elementary schools (one of which is a private school), two middle schools, and four high schools: the Experimental High School, the Professional Institute for Industry and Crafts, and two Technical, Commercial, and Surveying Institutes (one of which is a private school).

=== College ===
Ribera is home to the Arturo Toscanini Music Institute, equivalent to the State Music Conservatories and accredited in the system of higher artistic and musical education of the Ministry of Education, University and Research to issue Academic Diplomas equivalent to a Degree.

=== Museums ===
Ethno-anthropological Museum The Ribera Ethno-anthropological Museum, located in the former conference hall inside the Villa Comunale, was founded in 1989 by the "Ribera Verde" association, which has collected more than 4,000 artifacts from the rural, pastoral, and artisanal cultures of this area.

Beginning in the second half of the 1960s, the advent of mechanization enabled economic progress in the area and caused farmers and artisans to abandon the tools that had been used up until that time. The establishment of the museum has allowed all these disused tools to be recovered, catalogued, restored, conserved, and made accessible.

=== Theater ===
Ribera hosts the "Città di Ribera" theater festival, featuring both local and nationally renowned theater companies..

=== Media ===
Ribera's local weekly magazine is Momenti di vita locale, which has been published since 1989. Other periodicals include NOVANTADUE016[49], Paese mio, and Ribera Città del riso.

Online information sites about Ribera include ripost.it and SicaniaNews.it.

The town's radio station is Radio Torre Ribera, which broadcasts on 101.300 and 90.700 FM. Today, it is part of the inBlu 2000 network, which brings together around a hundred stations that broadcast throughout the peninsula. In the past, there have also been three other radio stations: Radio Luna Ribera, Radio Logos Ribera, and Radio Centrale Ribera. In the past, there was a town-wide television station called Tele Torre Ribera.

=== Music ===
The "Washington Navel - Vincenzo Bellini" band, which has a history spanning nearly two centuries, is based in Ribera.

== Economy ==
Agriculture is the commune's main industry, notably involved in the cultivation and marketing of the Washington navel orange – here introduced by emigrants returned from the United States – and strawberries. Such businesses are enhanced both by excellent climatic and environmental conditions and a supporting policy by the local authorities.

== Twin towns ==
- Oinousses, Greece
- (United States) Elizabeth, USA

== See also ==
- Caltabellotta
