= Palazzo Adriano =

Palazzo Adriano Pallaci
- Comune
- Comune di Palazzo Adriano
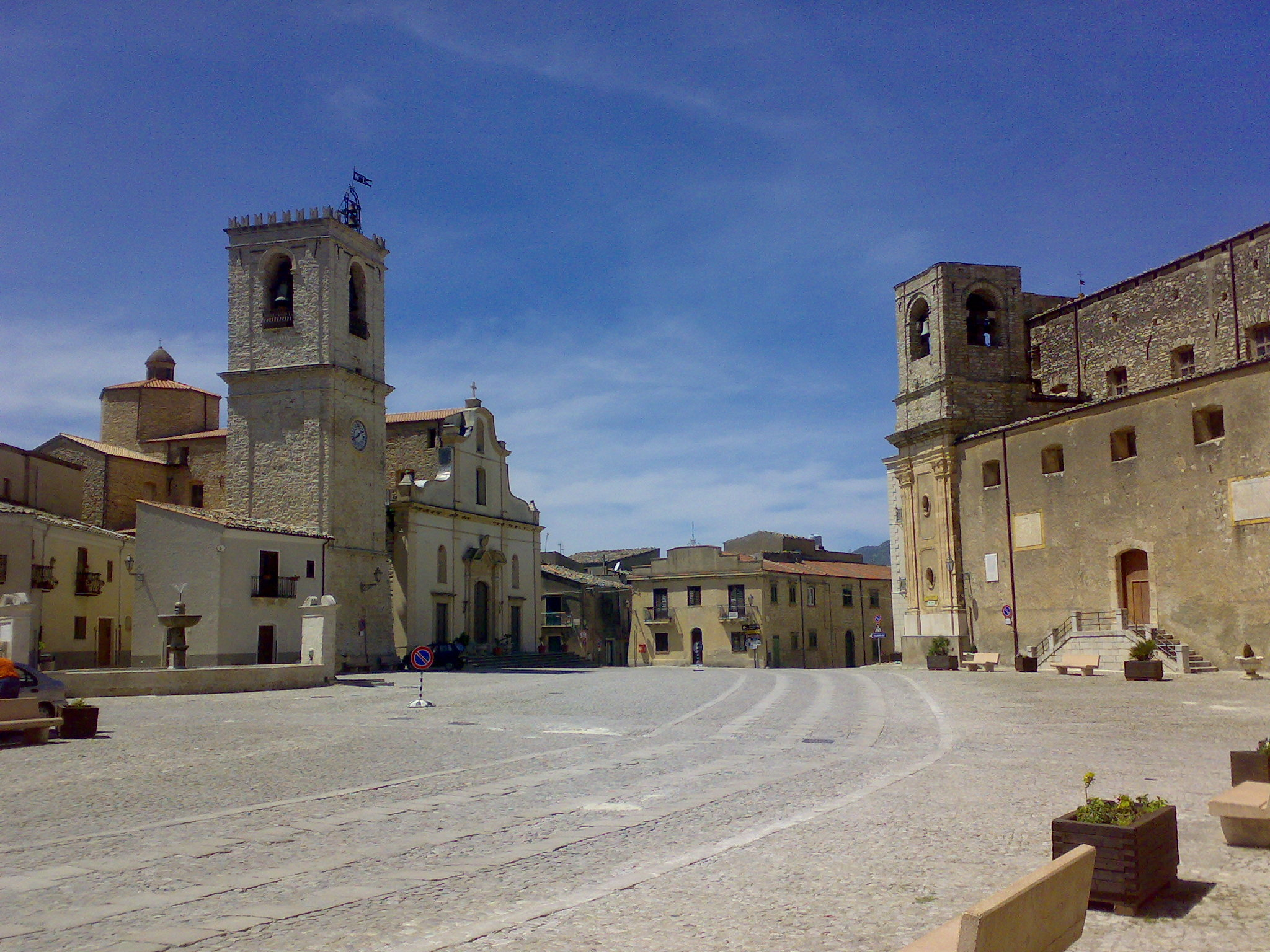
- Piazza Umberto I

- Coat of arms

- Location within Italy Location within Sicily
- Coordinates: 37°40′55″N 13°22′45″E
- Country: Italy
- Region: Sicily
- Metropolitan city: Palermo (PA)

Government
  - Mayor: Nicola Granà

Area
  - Total: 129 km^{2} (50 sq mi)

Population (31 May 2025)
  - Total: 1,726
  - Density: 13.4/km^{2} (34.7/sq mi)
- Time zone: UTC+1 (CET)
  - Summer (DST): UTC+2 (CEST)
- Postal code: 90030
- Dialing code: 091

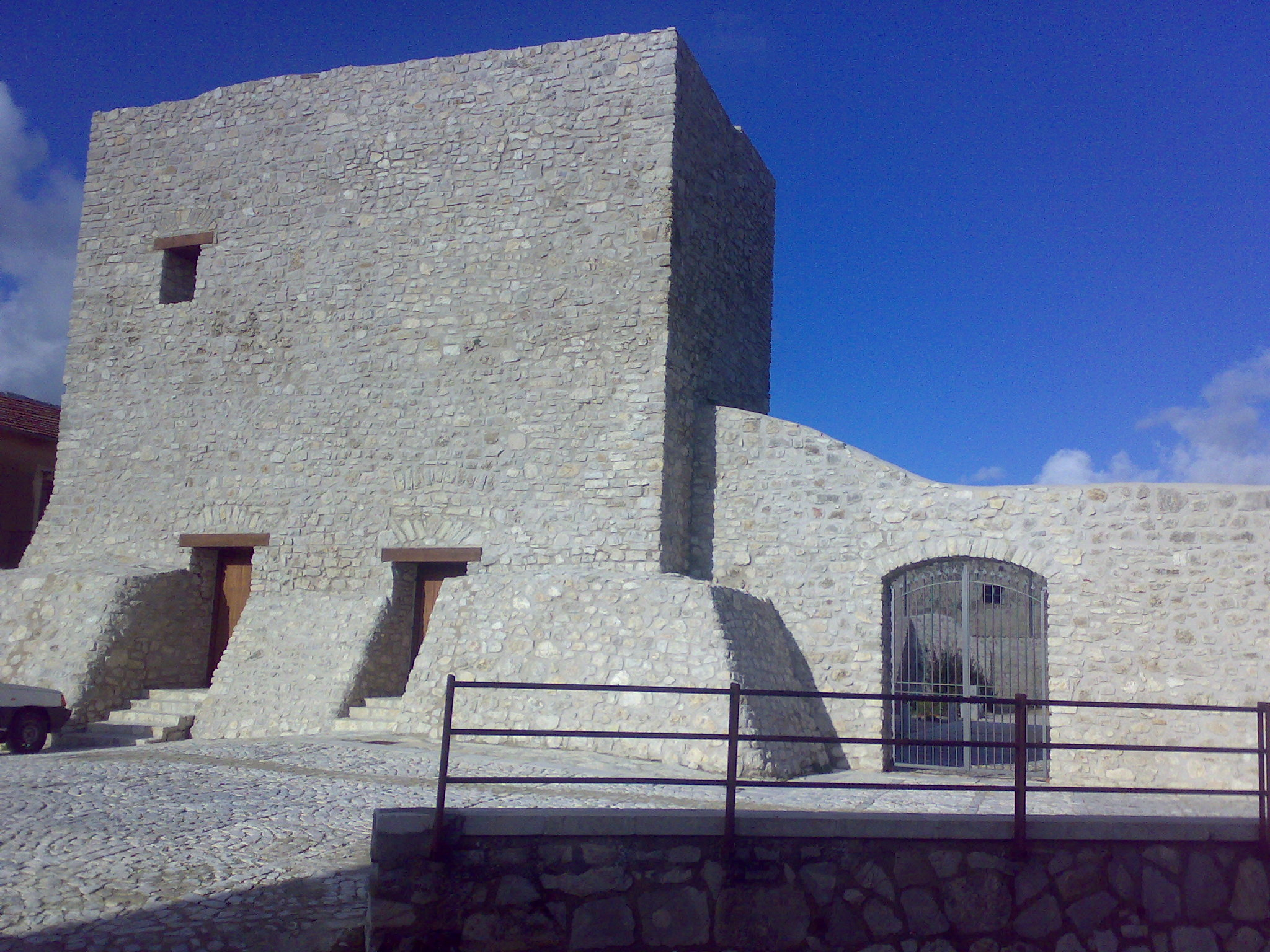
Bourbon Castle

Palazzo Adriano (IPA: [pa'latʦo adriˈano], Arbëreshë Albanian: Pallaci, Sicilian: U Palazzu) is a town and comune of Arbëresh origin in the Metropolitan City of Palermo, Sicily, southern Italy.

Located in the heart of Sicania on the northern slopes of Monte delle Rose, almost equidistant from Palermo and Agrigento, it is a town of Arbëreshë origin. Although the inhabitants have abandoned the use of the Arbëresh language, the town's inhabitants preserve the Byzantine rite in their liturgy.

Palazzo Adriano is best known internationally for being among the filming locations of the Oscar-winning film Cinema Paradiso. The local economy is primarily dedicated to agriculture.

== History ==
The first mention of a casale Adrianum (farmstead of Adriano) dates from before 1060 under the reign of the Norman Roger I of Sicily. More reliable is information about the hamlet of Palazzo Adriano reported in a 1243 document. From 1282, the fiefs land holdings that now constitute the area of Palazzo Adriano saw more than thirty baronies granted leases by the abbots of the monastery of Santa Maria di Fossanova. In the late 15th century, the Dara family was one of the first Albanian families to migrate from Albania to Italy after Skanderbeg's death. They migrated from the region of Rrjoll, northern Albania, Malësia to Palazzo Adriano. Other Albanian families also came here and they are the today Arbëreshë families of the region. In 1787, the Royal Court of Ferdinand IV of Naples captured all these land holdings, which fell under the control of Palermo.

== Ethnic groups ==
Starting in the 15th century, a group of Albanians, the Arbëreshë, settled in the sparsely populated areas around Palazzo Adriano. The fall of the last Albanian resistance under Skanderbeg after the Ottoman invasion prompted many Albanians to flee Albania. The Arbëreshë settled in small farmhouses built by shepherds and peasants. Throughout the ensuing centuries, the Arbëreshë kept their culture intact and continued to speak Albanian. In the 19th century, the flow of immigrants from Albania dried up, such that the Albanians in Palazzo Adriano became cut off from those in their homeland.

Although Palazzo Adriano is defined as an 'Albanian minority town' under the Law 482/99 ('Rules on the protection of historical linguistic minorities'), the Arbëresh language is no longer the common language within the Albanian community, and is today lost. The Albanian language continues in the prayer and liturgy of churches that follow the Byzantine Rite.

== Main sights ==
- Church of Maria SS. Assunta (16th century), Eastern Catholic
- Church of Maria SS. del Lume (18th century), Latin Church
- Church of Maria SS. del Carmelo (16th century). It has a single nave, with a portal with Corinthian columns.
- Sanctuary of San Nicola (16th century)
- Sanctuary of Santa Maria delle Grazie (16th century)
- Bourbon Castle

== Culture ==
In 1988, Giuseppe Tornatore also chose Palazzo Adriano as the setting for his film Nuovo Cinema Paradiso.

== Notable people ==
- Giovanni Emanuele Bidera, librettist and playwright, born in Palazzo Adriano in 1784
- Francesco Crispi, Prime Minister of Italy; his father Tommaso Crispi was from Palazzo Adriano.
- Giuseppe Crispi, author of the first monograph on the Albanian language. Uncle of Francesco Crispi, brother of his father Tommaso
- Gavril Dara Junior, politician and poet
