= Villafranca Sicula =

- Comune
- Comune di Villafranca Sicula
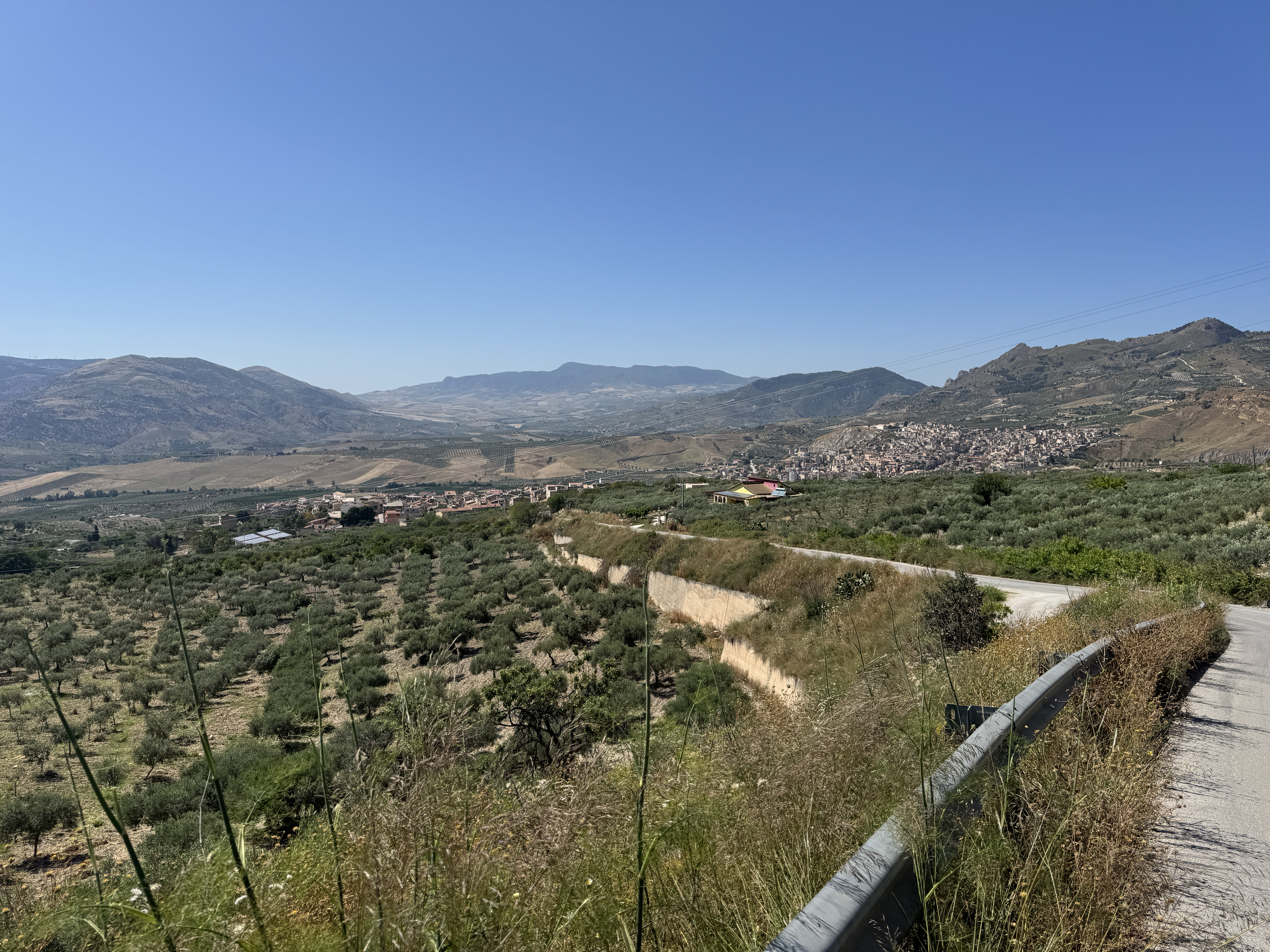
- Panorama of Villafranca Sicula

- Location within Italy Location within Sicily
- Coordinates: 37°35′N 13°17′E
- Country: Italy
- Region: Sicily
- Province: Province of Agrigento (AG)

Area
  - Total: 17.7 km^{2} (6.8 sq mi)
- Elevation: 326 m (1,070 ft)

Population (Dec. 2004)
  - Total: 1,496
  - Density: 84.5/km^{2} (219/sq mi)
- Demonym: Villafranchesi (o villafrancoti)
- Time zone: UTC+1 (CET)
  - Summer (DST): UTC+2 (CEST)
- Postal code: 92020
- Dialing code: 0925
- Website: www.comune.villafrancasicula.ag.it

Villafranca Sicula is a comune (municipality) in the Province of Agrigento in the Italian region Sicily, located about 60 kilometres (37 mi) south of Palermo and about 40 kilometres (25 mi) northwest of Agrigento. As of 31 December 2004, it had a population of 1,496 and an area of 17.7 square kilometres (6.8 mi^{2}).

Villafranca Sicula borders the following municipalities: Burgio, Calamonaci, Caltabellotta, Lucca Sicula.

The Roman Catholic cardinal Salvatore Pappalardo (1918–2006), archbishop emeritus of Palermo, is a well-known native of Villafranca Sicula.

== Demographic evolution ==
Historical population

Year	Pop.	±%
1861	2,392	—
1871	2,518	+5.3%
1881	2,599	+3.2%
1901	2,605	+0.2%
1911	2,645	+1.5%

Year	Pop.	±%
1921	2,540	−4.0%
1931	2,400	−5.5%
1936	2,411	+0.5%
1951	2,517	+4.4%
1961	2,248	−10.7%

Year	Pop.	±%
1971	1,913	−14.9%
1981	1,759	−8.1%
1991	1,693	−3.8%
2001	1,509	−10.9%

Source: Data from ISTAT
