= Charles Albert of Sardinia =

King of Sardinia from 1831 to 1849

Charles Albert
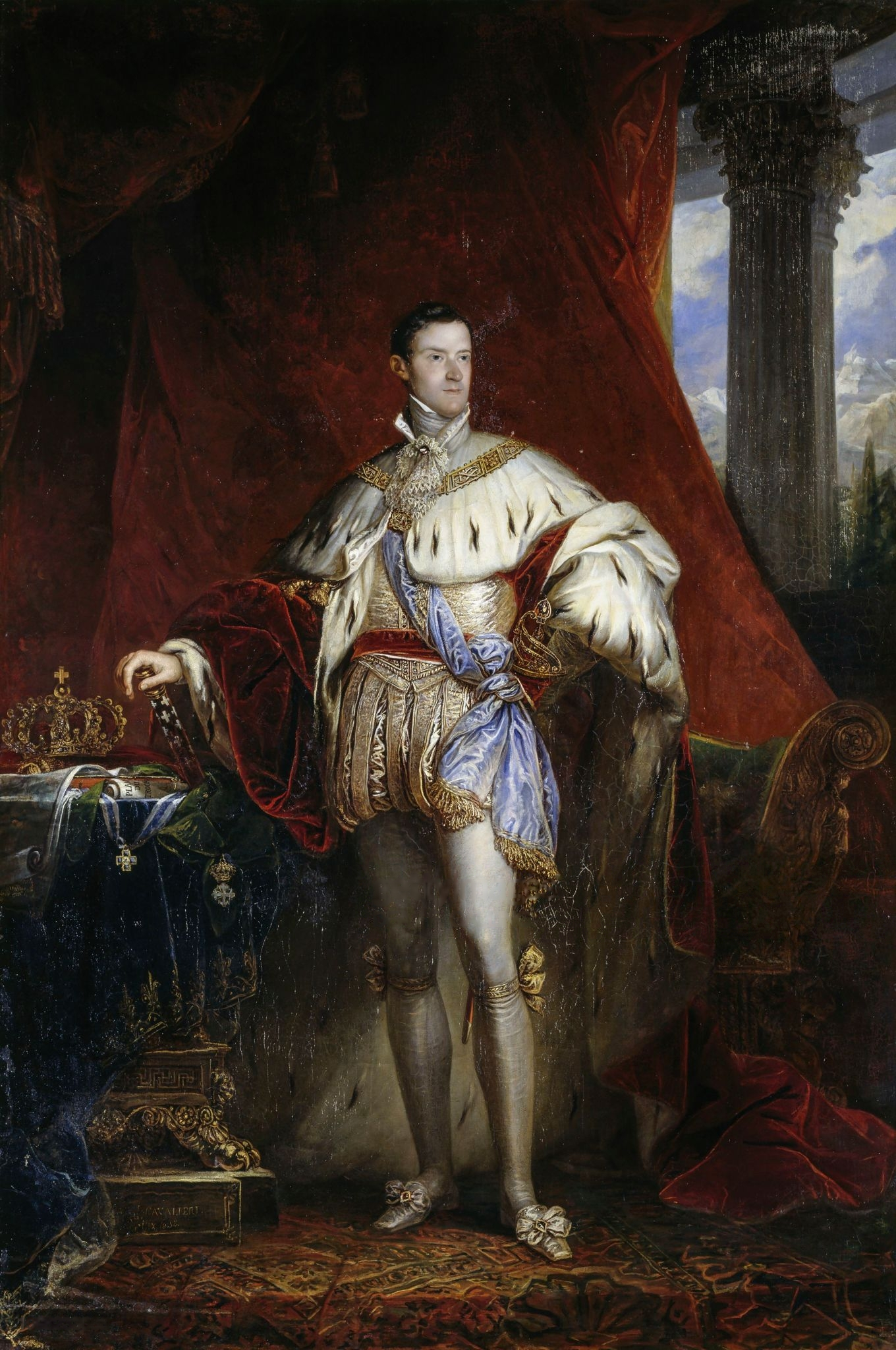
- Portrait by Ferdinando Cavalleri, c. 1833, wearing the collar of the Supreme Order of the Most Holy Annunciation

King of Sardinia Duke of Savoy
- Reign: 27 April 1831 – 23 March 1849
- Coronation: 27 April 1831
- Predecessor: Charles Felix
- Successor: Victor Emmanuel II
- Prime ministers: See list: Cesare Balbo Gabrio Casati Cesare Alfieri di Sostegno Ettore Perrone di San Martino Vincenzo Gioberti Agostino Chiodo
- Born: 2 October 1798; Palazzo Carignano, Turin
- Died: 28 July 1849 (aged 50); Porto, Portugal
- Burial: 14 October 1849; Royal Basilica, Turin
- Spouse: Maria Theresa of Tuscany (m. 1817)
- Issue: Victor Emmanuel II; Prince Ferdinando, Duke of Genoa; Princess Maria Cristina
Names
- Carlo Alberto Emanuele Vittorio Maria Clemente Saverio di Savoia
- House: Savoy-Carignano
- Father: Charles Emmanuel of Savoy
- Mother: Maria Christina of Saxony
- Religion: Catholic Church

Charles Albert (Italian: Carlo Alberto I; 2 October 1798 – 28 July 1849) was the King of Sardinia and ruler of the Savoyard state from 27 April 1831 until his abdication in 1849. His name is bound up with the first Italian constitution, the Statuto Albertino, and with the First Italian War of Independence (1848–1849).

During the Napoleonic period, Charles Albert resided in France, where he received a liberal education. As Prince of Carignano in 1821, he granted and then withdrew his support for a rebellion which sought to force Victor Emmanuel I to institute a constitutional monarchy. He became a conservative and participated in the legitimist expedition against the Spanish liberals in 1823 known as the "Hundred Thousand Sons of Saint Louis".

Charles Albert became king of Sardinia in 1831 on the death of his distant cousin Charles Felix, who had no heir. As king, after an initial conservative period during which he supported various European legitimist movements, he adopted the neo-Guelph idea of a federal Italy, led by the Pope and freed from the House of Habsburg in 1848. In the same year, he granted the Albertine Statute, the first Italian constitution, which remained in force until 1947.

Charles Albert led his forces against the Imperial Austrian army in the First Italian War of Independence but was abandoned by Pope Pius IX and Ferdinand II of the Two Sicilies, and was defeated in 1849 at the Battle of Novara, after which he abdicated in favour of his son, Victor Emmanuel II. Charles Albert died in exile a few months later in the Portuguese city of Porto.

The attempt to free northern Italy from Austria represents the first attempt of the House of Savoy to alter the equilibrium established in the Italian peninsula after the Congress of Vienna. These efforts were continued successfully by his son Victor Emmanuel II, who became the first king of a unified Italy in 1861. Charles Albert received several nicknames including "the Italian Hamlet" (given to him by Giosuè Carducci on account of his gloomy, hesitant, and enigmatic character), as well as "the Hesitant King" (Re Tentenna) because he hesitated for a long time between the establishment of a constitutional monarchy and the reinforcement of absolute rule.

== Early life and studies ==
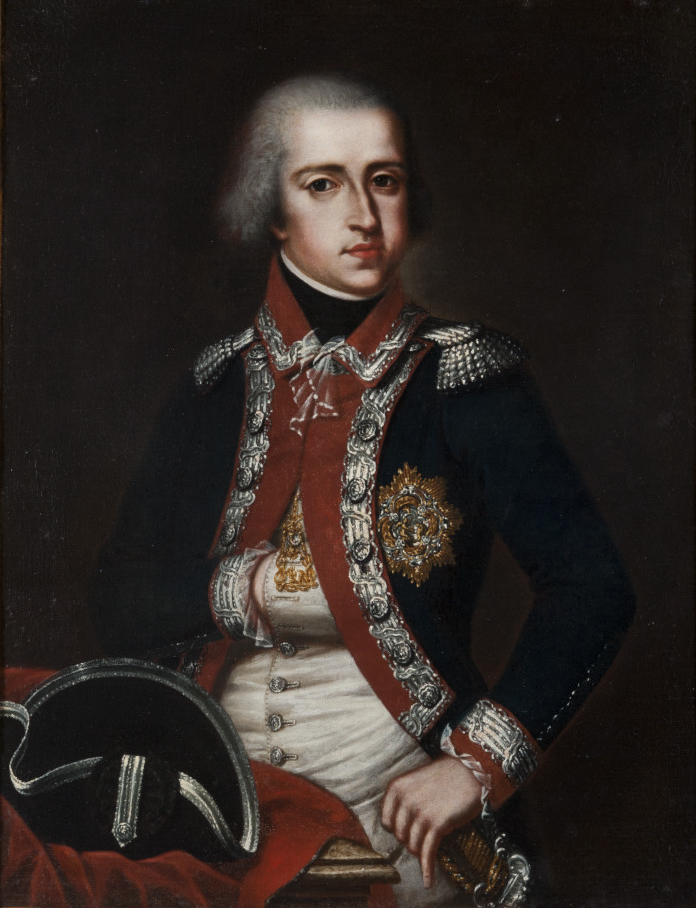
Charles Emmanuel, Prince of Carignano, father of Charles Albert

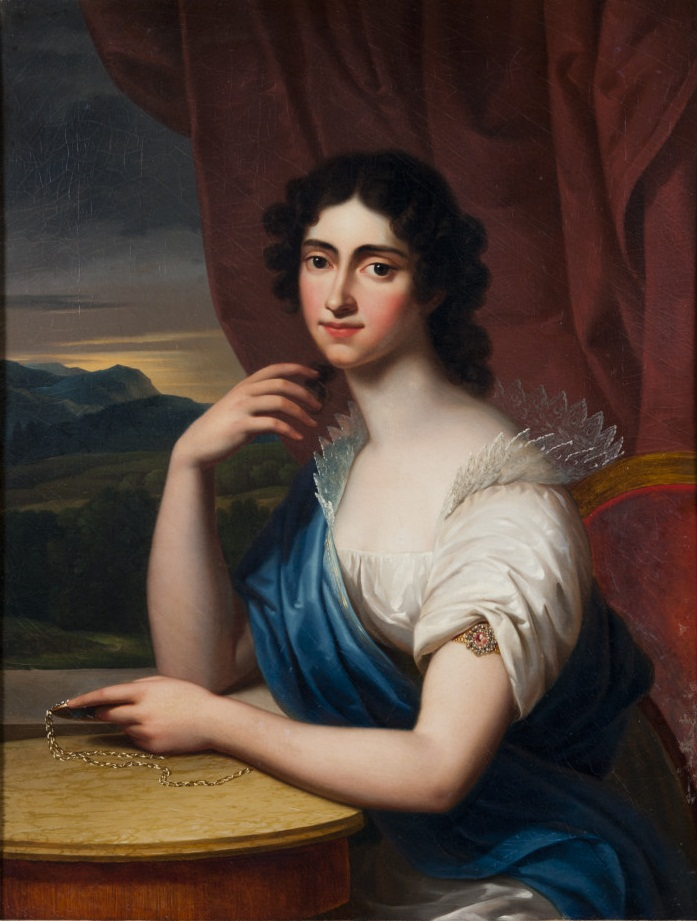
Maria Christina of Saxony, mother of Charles Albert

Charles Albert was born at the Palazzo Carignano in Turin on 2 October 1798 to Charles Emmanuel, Prince of Carignano, and Maria Cristina of Saxony. His father was the great-great-great-grandson of Thomas Francis, Prince of Carignano, youngest legitimate son of Charles Emmanuel I, Duke of Savoy, and founder of the Carignano line of the House of Savoy. Since he did not belong to the main line of the House of Savoy his chances at birth of succeeding to the kingdom were slim. Although the reigning king, Charles Emmanuel IV, had no children, at his death the throne would pass to his brother Victor Emmanuel and then to the latter's son Charles Emmanuel. After that, in the line of succession there were two further brothers of Charles Emmanuel IV: Maurizio Giuseppe and Charles Felix. In 1799, two of these heirs died: the young Charles Emmanuel (aged only three years) and Maurizio Giuseppe (from malaria in Sardinia).

=== Napoleonic period ===
Charles Albert's father, Charles Emmanuel of Carignano, had studied in France and had been an officer in the French army. Sympathetic to liberalism, he travelled to Turin in 1796, in the wake of the French invasion of 1796 and King Charles Emmanuel IV's flight into exile. There Charles Emmanuel of Carignano and his wife joined the French cause. Despite this, the pair were sent to Paris, where they were placed under surveillance and forced to live in poor conditions in a house in the suburbs. These were the circumstances in which their children, Charles Albert and his sister Maria Elisabeth (born 13 April 1800), grew up.

On 16 August 1800, Charles Emmanuel of Carignano died suddenly. It was up to Charles Albert's mother to deal with the French, who had no intention of recognizing her rights, titles or property. She nonetheless refused to send her son to the Savoy family in Sardinia for a conservative education. In 1810, Maria Christina married for a second time, to Giuseppe Massimiliano Thibaut di Montléart, whose relationship with Charles Albert was poor.

When he was twelve years old, Charles Albert and his mother were finally granted an audience with Napoleon, who granted the boy the title of count and an annual pension. Since it was no longer appropriate for him to be educated at home, Charles Albert was sent to the Collège Stanislas in Paris in 1812. He remained at the school for two years, but did not attend regularly; instead, he attended only to sit exams, apparently with success. In the meantime, Albertina had moved to Geneva, where Charles Albert joined her from March 1812 to December 1813, and he studied with the Protestant Pastor, Jean-Pierre Etienne Vaucher (1763–1841), a follower of Jean-Jacques Rousseau.

After Napoleon's defeat at the Battle of Leipzig in October 1813, the family left Geneva, fearing the arrival of Austrian forces and returned to France. At the beginning of 1814, Charles Albert enrolled in the military school in Bourges, hoping to become an officer in the French army. He was sixteen years old. Napoleon named him a lieutenant of dragoons in 1814.

== First period in Turin (1814–1821) ==
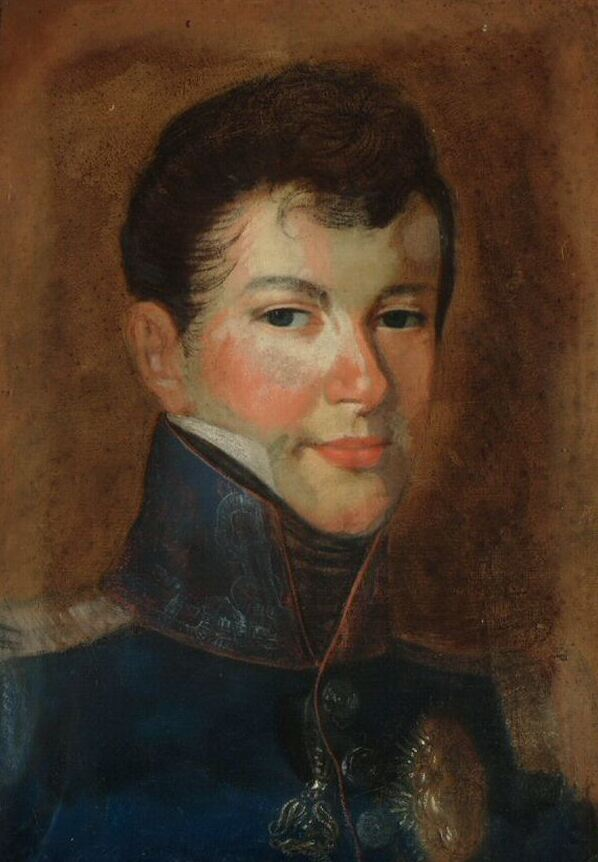
Youthful portrait of Charles Albert

After Napoleon was defeated for good, the new king Louis XVIII celebrated the restoration of the Bourbon dynasty in Paris on 16 May 1814. Among those present at the festivities were Princess Maria Christina di Carignano and her children Charles Albert and Elisabetta. Despite their past, the family was treated well, although Charles Albert had to renounce the title of Count of the Empire, which had been conferred upon him at the military school in Bourges and the annuity which Napoleon had granted him.

The re-establishment of peace in Europe meant that Charles Albert could return to Turin, and he was advised to do so by his tutor, count Alessandro Di Saluzzo di Menusiglio, and by Albertina. He left Paris (and his step-father) and arrived in Turin on 24 May. There he was welcomed affectionately by King Victor Emmanuel I (Charles Emmanuel IV had abdicated in 1802) and his wife Queen Maria Theresa, by birth a Habsburg archduchess. His property and lands were restored to him and he was granted the Palazzo Carignano as a residence. Given the dynastic situation (neither Victor Emmanuel nor his brother Charles Felix had male children) Charles Albert was now the heir presumptive.

Thus he was assigned a mentor to counter the liberal ideas that he had learned in France. The first of these was Count Filippo Grimaldi del Poggetto, and after he had failed, the dragoon, Policarpo Cacherano d'Osasco. Although he was better equipped for the task, he was not able to influence the mindset of Charles Albert, who began to suffer from anxiety at this time.

=== Marriage and personality ===
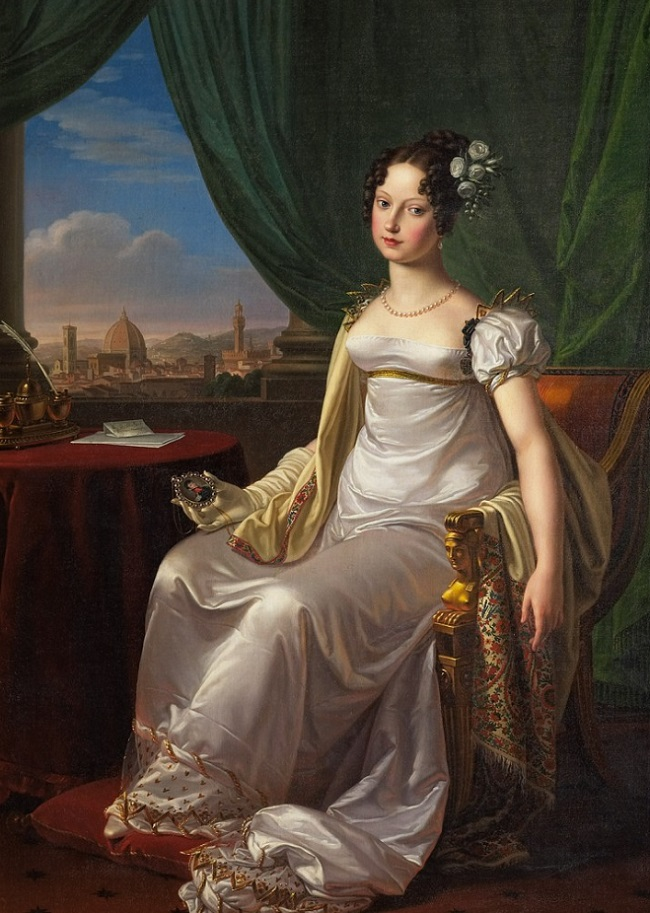
Maria Theresa of Tuscany Charles Albert's wife

The court decided that marriage would provide the prince with internal equilibrium. The chosen bride, accepted by Charles Albert, was the sixteen-year-old daughter of Ferdinand III of Tuscany, Archduchess Maria Theresa, a relative of Queen Maria Theresa. Charles Albert travelled to the Grand Duchy of Tuscany and then to Rome on 18 March 1817 and, after a 6-month engagement, married Maria Theresa on 30 September in Florence Cathedral. The wedding was followed by a ball organized by the Sardinian embassy in Florence. After that, on 6 October, the couple departed for Piedmont. On 11 October, they reached Castello del Valentino and from there they made their formal entrance into Turin.

The young Maria Theresa was very shy and religious, quite different from Charles Albert's temperament. The couple resided in the Palazzo Carignano, to which Charles Albert began to invite young intellectuals with whom he shared liberal ideas. The most intimate of these friends were Santorre di Rossi de Pomarolo, Roberto d'Azeglio, Giacinto Collegno, Cesare Balbo, Guglielmo Moffa di Lisio Gribaldi and Carlo Emanuele Asinari di San Marzano.

In these years, Charles Albert also suffered from a deep religious crisis. This led to a friendship with the French diplomat Jean Louis de Douhet d'Auzers and a visit by the prince to Rome in 1817 to visit the former king Charles Emmanuel IV, who had retired to a monastery. In the years following his marriage, however, Charles Albert had extramarital affairs with several women, including Marie Caroline de Bourbon, widow of the Duke of Berry. Maria Theresa had two miscarriages – the second in 1819 as a result of a carriage accident – but gave birth to a son on 14 March 1820, Victor Emmanuel, the future King of Italy.

=== Participation in the Revolution of 1821 ===
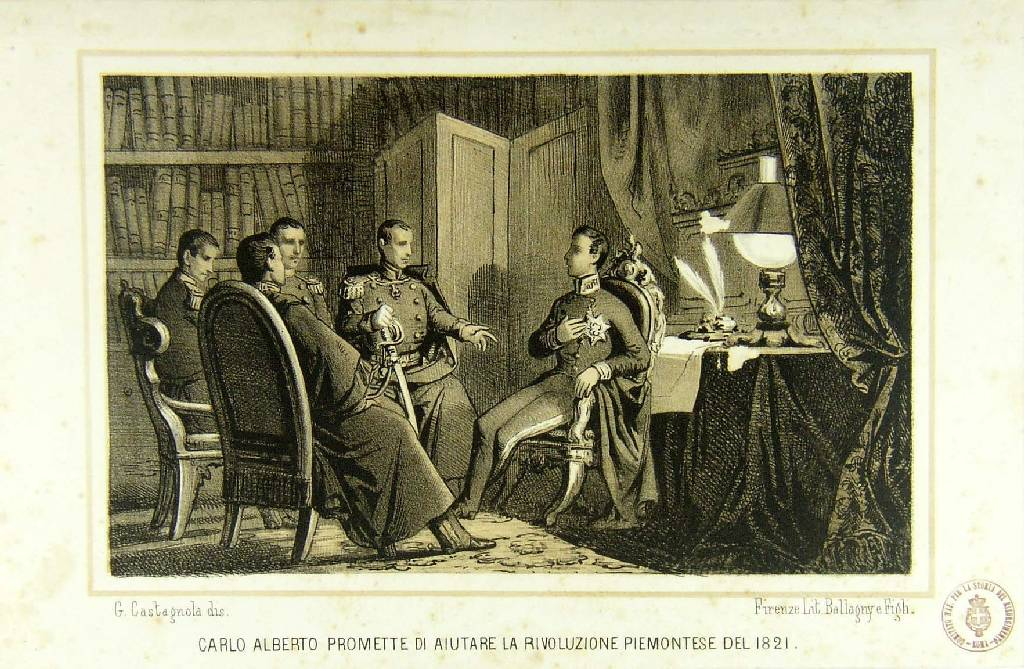
Charles Albert promised his support to the conspirators behind the 1821 revolution, in a print from 1850 to 1875.

After the 1820 uprising in Cádiz, King Ferdinand VII of Spain was forced to grant the Spanish Constitution of 1812. The hope of obtaining similar constitutions arose in many European states. Insurrections broke out in Naples and Palermo. On 6 March 1821, Santorre di Rossi de Pomarolo, Giacinto Provana di Collegno, Carlo di San Marzano and Guglielmo Moffa di Lisio (all military officers, officials, or sons of ministers) and Roberto d'Azeglio met with Charles Albert. The young liberals were ready to act and had identified the prince as a new type of man for the House of Savoy — one ready to break with the absolutist past.

The conspirators had no desire to abolish the House of Savoy, but claimed, on the contrary, that they hoped to force it to grant reforms which would grant it the gratitude of the people. During the months of preparation, Charles Albert had assured them of his support and on 6 March he confirmed this, declaring that he supported armed action. They were to raise troops, surround King Victor Emmanuel I's residence at Moncalieri and demand that he grant a constitution and declare war on Austria. Charles Albert was to play the role of mediator between the conspirators and the king.

On the morning of the next day, 7 March, Charles Albert had second thoughts and informed the conspirators of this. Indeed, he summoned the Minister of War, Alessandro Di Saluzzo di Menusiglio and told him that he had discovered a revolutionary plot. There was an attempt to halt the conspiracy, which nevertheless continued to grow bolder on the next day, with another visit by di Rossi and di Marzano. Yet, they grew uncertain and gave orders to cancel the insurrection, which was due to break out on 10 March. The same day, Charles Albert, full of regret, raced to Moncalieri, where he revealed everything to Victor Emmanuel I and begged for a pardon. The situation had reached a tipping point. In the night, the garrison of Alessandria, commanded by one of the conspirators (Guglielmo Ansaldi), rose up and took control of the city. At this point, the revolutionaries decided to act, despite the abandonment of the prince.

=== Regency and Spanish Constitution ===
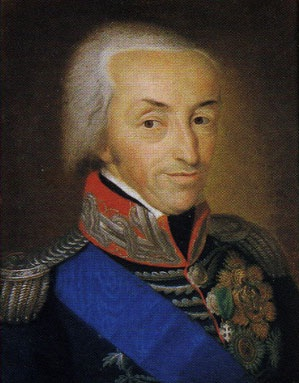
Victor Emmanuel I

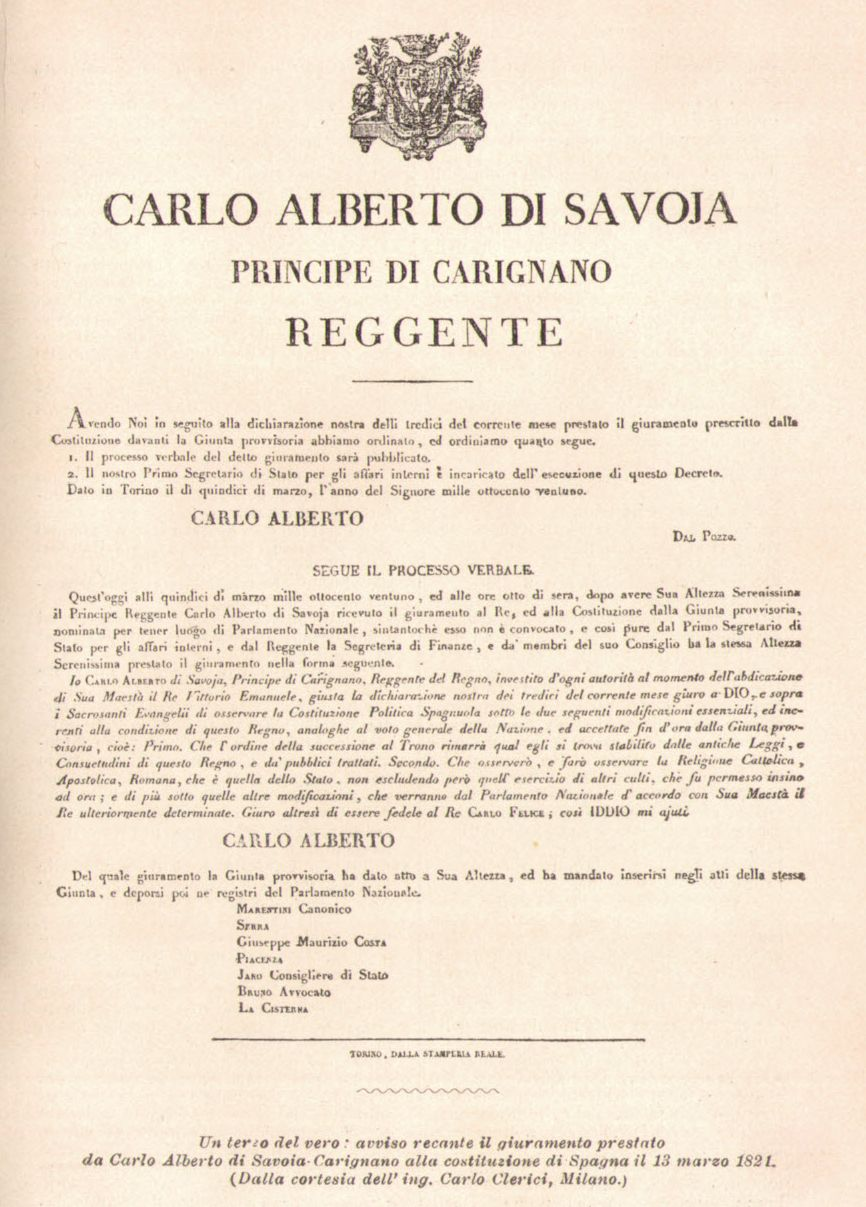
The decree by which Charles Albert announced the Spanish Constitution of 1821

On 11 March 1821, Victor Emmanuel I called a meeting of the council of the Crown, in which Charles Albert also participated. Along with the majority of those who were present, Charles Albert declared his willingness to grant the constitution. Rumours spread however that armed intervention to restore order in Italy by a joint Austrian and Russian force were imminent. The king decided to wait, therefore, but the next day, the Citadel of Turin fell into the hands of the rebels. Victor Emmanuel I then asked Charles Albert and Cesare Balbo to negotiate with the Carbonari, but the latter refused any contact with the two. That evening, as the armed uprising spread, the king abdicated in favour of his brother Charles Felix. Since the latter was in Modena at the time, Charles Albert was appointed regent.

Only 23 years of age, Charles Albert found himself in charge of resolving a serious political crisis which he himself had been responsible for provoking. The old ministers abandoned him and he was forced to nominate a new government: the lawyer Ferdinando dal Pozzo as Minister of the Interior, the general Emanuele Pes di Villamarina as Minister of War, and Lodovico Sauli d'Igliano as Minister of Foreign Affairs. He tried to negotiate with the rebels, with no results. Terrified, he claimed that it was impossible to make any decisions without the agreement of the new king and therefore sent Charles Felix a letter with an account of the events that had taken place and a request for instructions. But he was also afraid that he would become the object of popular anger if he continued to delay and so, on 13 March 1821, Charles Albert published a proclamation conceding the Spanish Constitution, with the reservation that this grant was pending the approval of the king.

On 14 March, the regent decided to form a Junta which would be able to act as guardians of the parliament. The head was Canon Pier Bernardo Marentini, a Jansenist, who was Vicar-General of the Archdiocese of Turin and had been chosen as Bishop of Piacenza in 1813 but denied the role by the Pope. On 15 March, in the presence of the Junta, Charles Albert swore to observe the Spanish Constitution, which had been amended with a few clauses requested by Victor Emmanuel I's queen, Maria Theresa.

Meanwhile, the representatives of liberals of Lombardy had arrived: Giorgio Pallavicino Trivulzio, Gaetano Castiglia, and Giuseppe Arconati Visconti. They asked Charles Albert to declare war on Austria in order to free Milan, but the prince refused. Instead, he accepted the advice of Cesare Balbo, who restored discipline within the army, stopped excesses and firmly established the troops loyal to the king. Charles Felix himself, however, had responded very badly to the news of his brother's abdication, which he considered an "abominable act of violence" and, from Modena, he sent an order to Charles Albert, ordering him to come to Novara, and declaring any actions taken in the name of the king after the abdication of his brother, including the concession of the Spanish Constitution, to be null and void.

== Reactionary period (1821–1831) ==
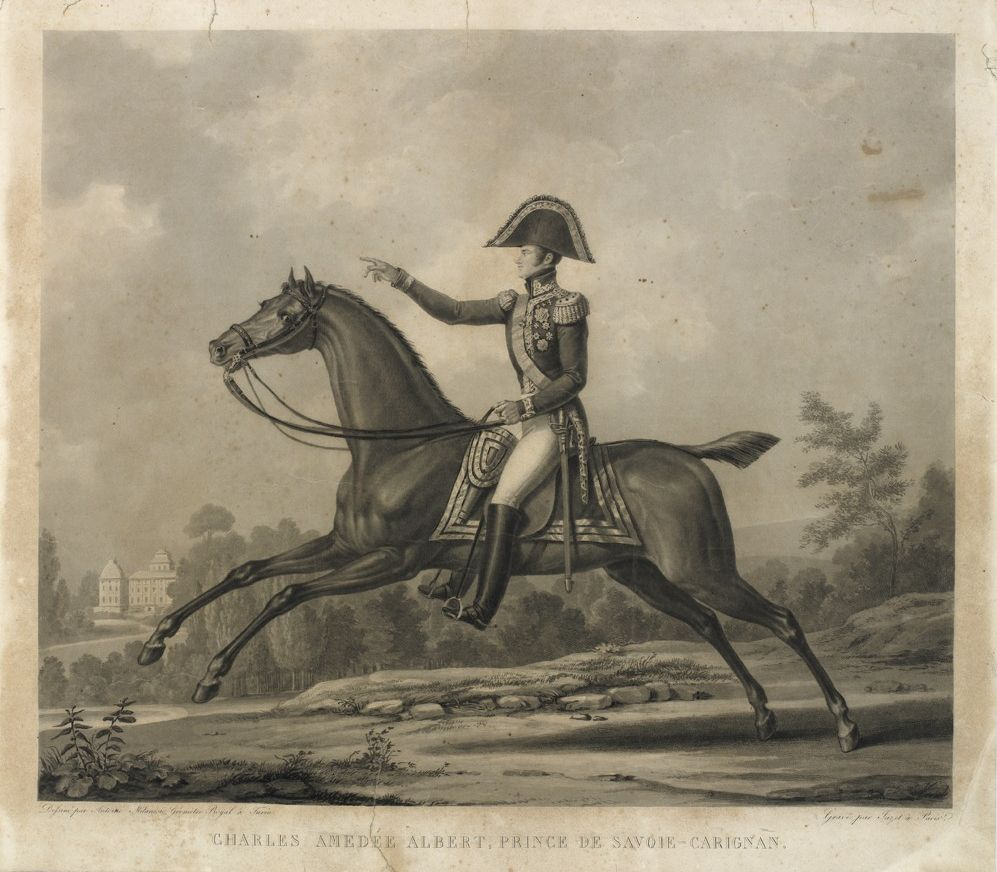
Charles Albert, Prince of Carignano in a French lithograph of the period

At midnight on 21 March 1821, Charles Albert secretly departed from the Palazzo Carignano. His departure was not discovered by the revolutionaries until the next day. From Rondissone, on 23 March he made for San Germano, from which he intended to travel to Novara, which remained loyal to the king. At Novara he remained for six days before a dispatch arrived from Charles Felix on the 29th, ordering him to depart immediately for Tuscany.

=== Florence ===
On the afternoon of 2 April 1821, the prince arrived in Florence. His wife and son, who had been in France, followed on the 13th. The Prince's father-in-law, Grand Duke Ferdinand III granted them the Palazzo Pitti as a residence. In May, Charles Felix, who had successfully secured Austrian assistance to restore order, met with Victor Emmanuel I at Lucca. The two discussed Charles Albert's conduct for a long time and, although the new queen Maria Christina spoke in his defence, they decided that he was responsible for the conspiracy.

As a result of this decision and the circumstances, Charles Albert decided to disavow his liberal ideas, especially as Charles Felix had entertained the idea of eliminating him from the line of succession and passing the crown straight to his son Victor Emmanuel. Charles Felix asked the opinion of Metternich on this, who was unexpectedly opposed to the idea.

On 16 September 1822, the infant Victor Emmanuel barely escaped from a fire in his cot, exposing the tenuous nature of the line of succession, which was taken out of danger by the birth of a second son, Ferdinand, on 15 November. In Florence, Charles Albert cultivated various cultural interests. He became a collector of old books, but was also interested in contemporary authors, acquiring the poetry of Alphonse de Lamartine and the conservative Joseph de Maistre.

=== Spanish Expedition ===
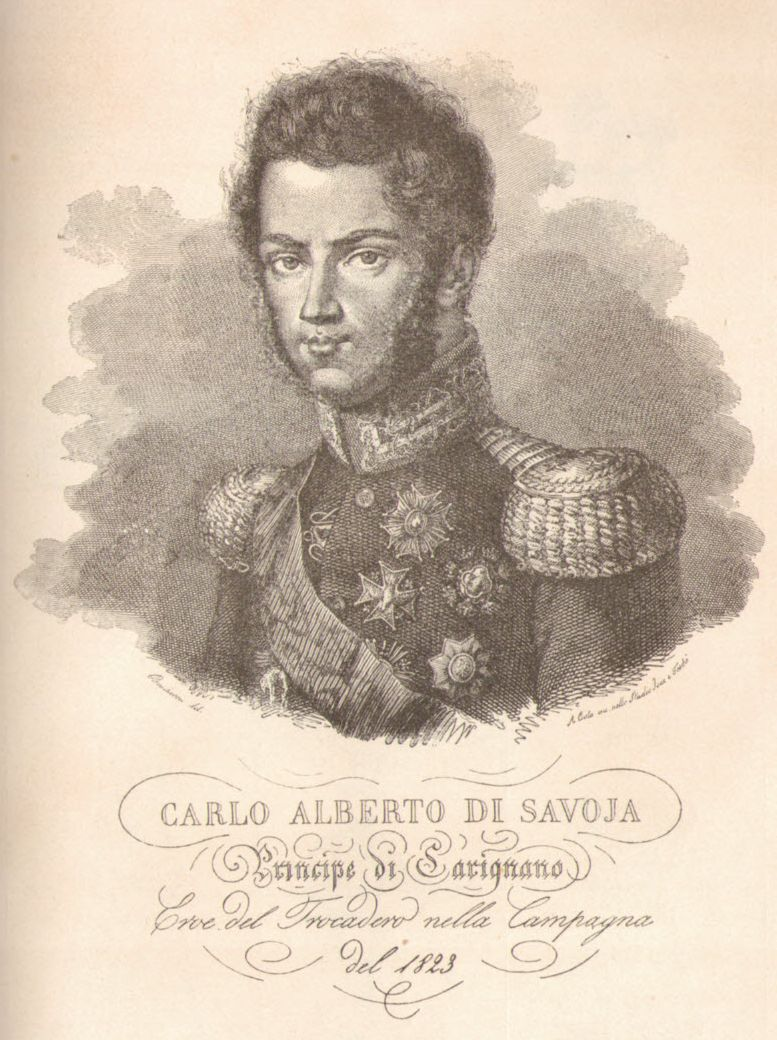
Charles Albert as a hero of the Battle of Trocadero

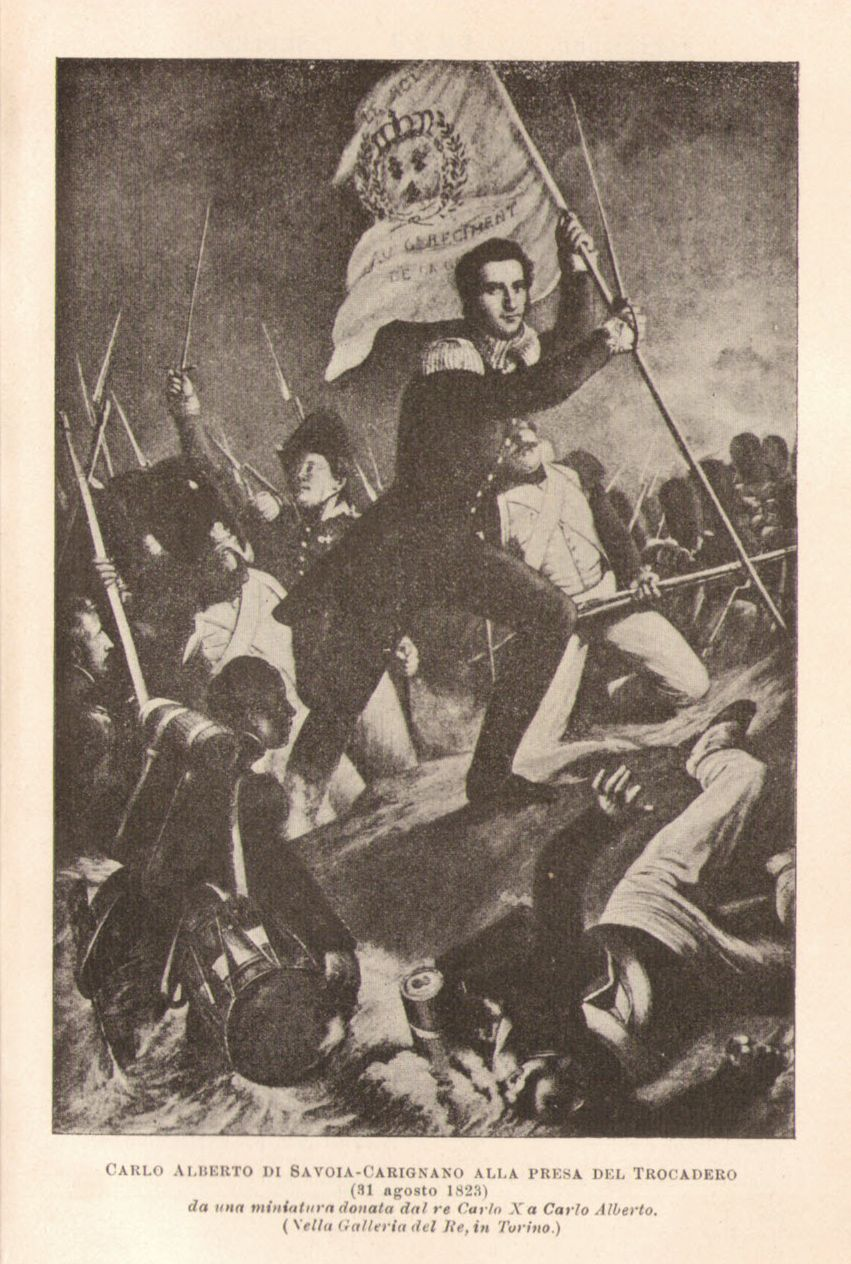
Charles Albert in the assault on Trocadero. From a miniature donated by King Charles X of France.

At the beginning of 1823, Duke Louis Antoine, Duke of Angoulême assumed command of the French expeditionary force which the European powers had entrusted with the task of suppressing the liberal revolution in Spain and restoring King Ferdinand VII to the Spanish throne after he had been captured by Spanish revolutionaries in Cádiz. Charles Albert wished to demonstrate his penitence and therefore asked to be part of the contingent. He wrote to Charles Felix on this subject for the first time on 20 February 1823, but only received permission to depart on 26 April.

On 2 May, Charles Albert embarked on the Sardinian frigate Commercio at Livorno, which arrived in Marseille on 7 May. The next day, Charles Albert set out, arriving in Boceguillas on the 18th. By the time he arrived there, he had been assigned to the division of the French General Étienne de Bordesoulle. on the 24th, he arrived at Madrid, where he remained until 2 June, and then he set out for the south. At a clash with the enemy during the crossing of the Sierra Morena, he demonstrated courage and the French made him a member of the Legion of Honour. He proceeded to Córdoba, Utrera, Jerez de los Caballeros and El Puerto de Santa María, where he waited for the order to attack the fortress of Cádiz, the Trocadero, which was the last remaining refuge of the Spanish constitutional government.

At the end of August 1823, with the French fleet aiding from the sea, the troops launched an assault on the Trocadero. Charles Albert fought at the head of the troops crossing the canal—the sole point of entry to the fortress. He plunged into the water holding the flag of the 6th regiment of the Royal Guard, forded the canal and leapt into the enemy trenches. He sought to prevent the enemy prisoners from being killed, and the French soldiers gave him the epaulettes of an officer killed in the assault, so that he might be distinguished from a regular grenadier.

Charles Albert remained at his post until nightfall, and the next day he was among the first to break into Trocadero. King Ferdinand VII and queen Maria Josepha, his cousin, were freed and embraced him in joy at seeing him. On 2 September there was a grand military parade, after which the Duc d'Angoulême decorated Charles Albert with the Cross of the Order of Saint Louis.

=== Visit to Paris and return to Turin ===
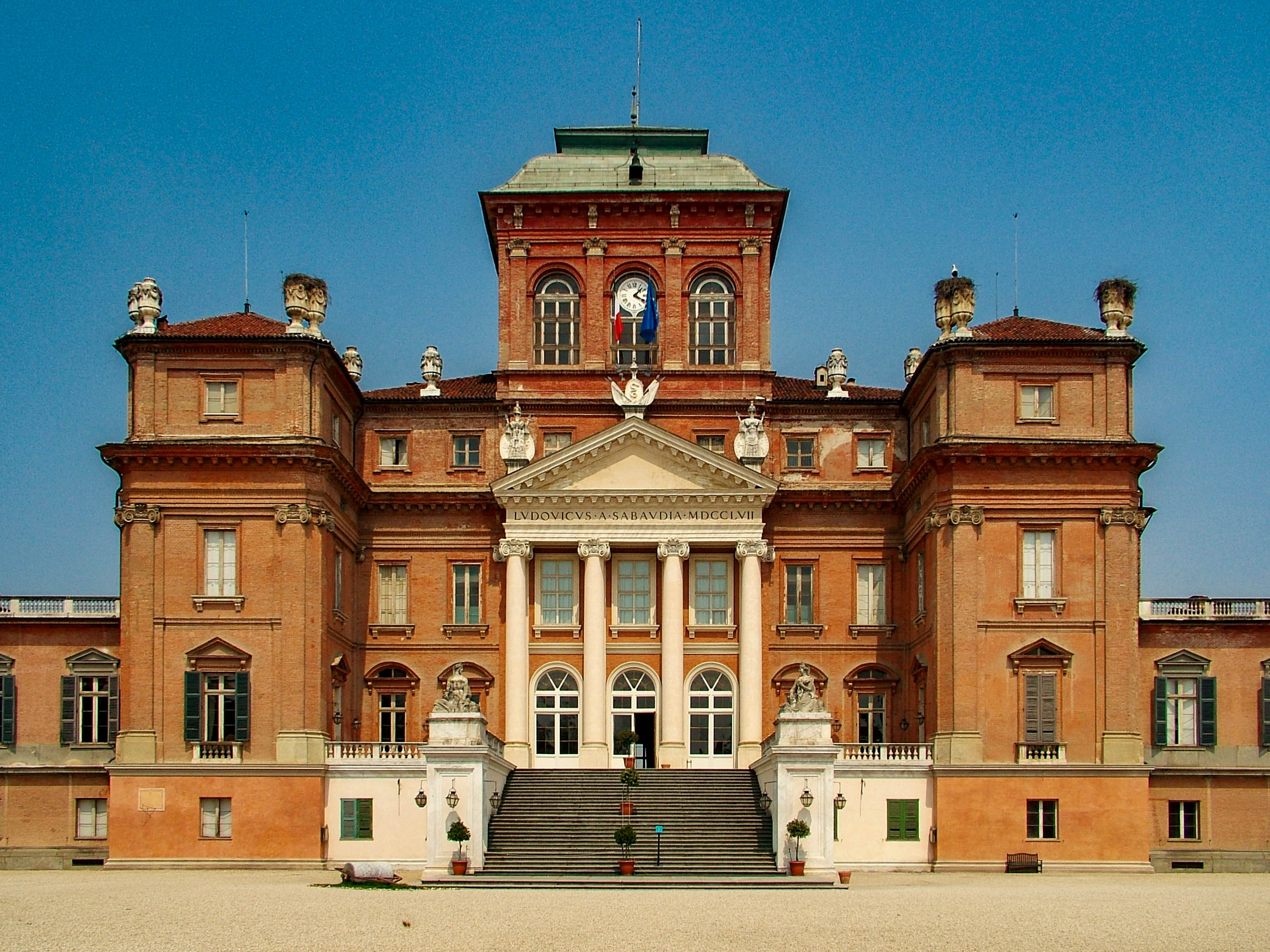
The facade of Racconigi Castle, the preferred residence of Prince Charles Albert

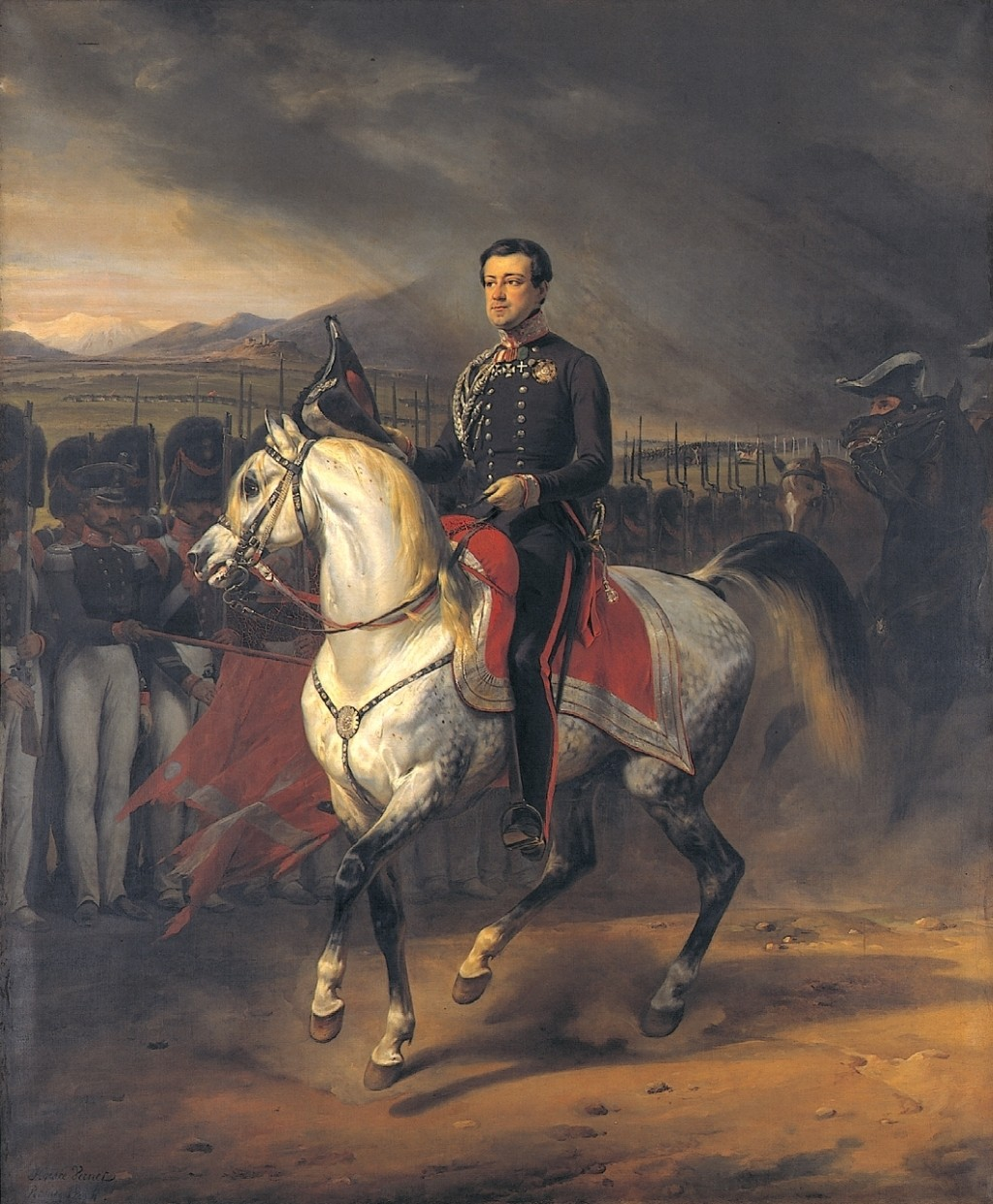
Charles Albert returns to Turin in February 1824, after the Spanish Expedition in this painting by Horace Vernet, 1834

With the dissolution of the expeditionary force, Charles Albert travelled from Seville to Paris, arriving on 3 December 1823. In the French capital, he participated in balls, receptions, and parties, and developed a close relationship with Marie Caroline, widow of the Duc de Berry. On 15 December, King Louis XVIII held a grand reception for the victors of Trocadero, at which Charles Albert was among the guests of honour.

King Charles Felix of Sardinia decided that, as a result of his success, it was time for Charles Albert to return to Turin. The prince was required to swear "to respect and religiously maintain all the fundamental laws of the monarchy when I ascend to power, which have led to fortune and glory over the centuries." On 29 January 1824, Charles Albert received permission to depart for Turin. At a final meeting with Louis XVIII, he received some advice on rulership and was enrolled in the Order of the Holy Spirit, the most prestigious chivalrous order of the French monarchy.

On 2 February, Charles Albert departed and on the 6th he reached Mont Cenis, where he received orders to enter Turin by night, in order to avoid protests. Charles Albert did so, probably on the 23rd. Once he had returned to Turin, Charles Albert resided mainly at Racconigi Castle, where he began preparations for reigning. He began to study a subject which received little attention at court – the economy – and in 1829 he received permission to visit Sardinia. As a result of this visit, he gained an accurate understanding of the conditions on the island. He was a prolific writer. In 1827, along with his wife, he wrote 38 fairy tales for their children in French, the language which the family used at home, entitled Contes moraux ("Moral Tales"). The next year, he tried his hand at comedy and after that, he occupied himself with literary criticism and history. He would publish three works: Notes on the Waldensians, Records of Andalusia and Voyage to Sardinia. Charles Albert regretted all of these and subsequently ordered them to be withdrawn from circulation. He also wrote a great volume of letters and literary exercises.

Despite the conservative attitudes of the period, Charles Albert supported literati who held liberal ideas, such as Carlo Giuseppe Guglielmo Botta, whose books were banned in Piedmont. He owned the works of Adam Smith and the Collection of Classic Italian Writers on Political Economy, edited by Pietro Custodi, a supporter of Napoleon.

=== Accession to the throne ===
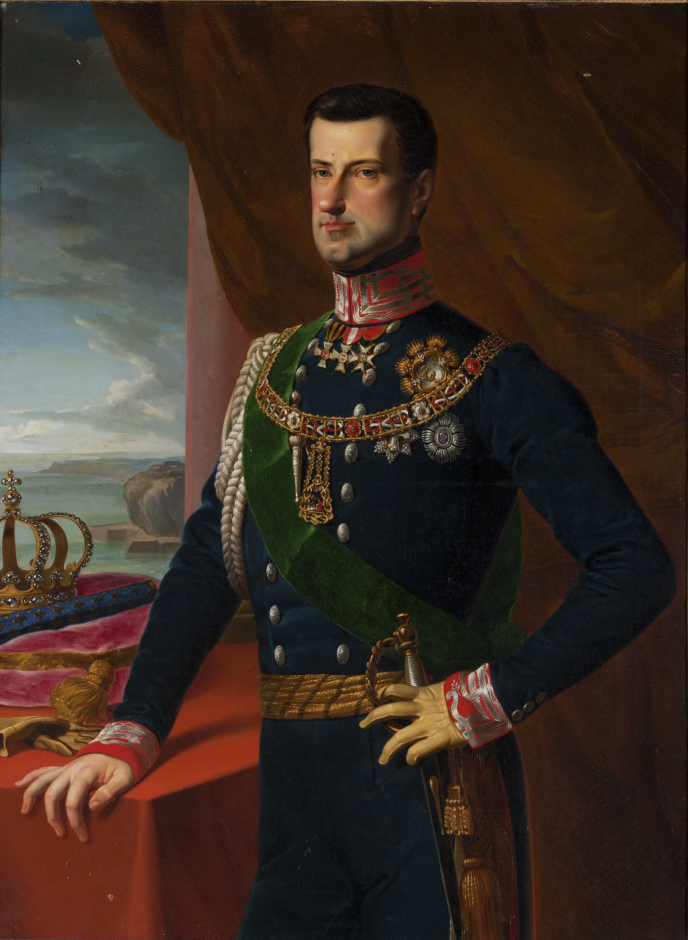
Charles Albert, by Pietro Ayres (1832)

In 1830, Charles Felix became very ill. He summoned Charles Albert to his sick bed on 24 April 1831. The entire government was present in the room as the king said to the ministers, "Behold my heir and successor, I am sure that he will act for the good of his subjects".

Charles Felix died on 27 April at 2:45 pm. Charles Albert closed the corpse's eyes, kissed its hand and then assumed the throne. He received the dignitaries of court and brought his sons into the Royal Palace. At 5:00 pm, the troops rendered their oaths to the new king at the direction of Governor Ignazio Thaon di Revel, who published the proclamation relating to this. Thus the throne passed to the House of Carignano and the direct line of Savoy came to an end.

== Pro-Austrian period (1831–1845) ==
Thus Charles Albert came to the throne aged 33. His health was poor; he had liver disease. His faith added to his suffering; he wore a cilice and slept alone on an iron bed, waking at 5:00 am every morning and celebrating two masses per day. He worked from 10:00 am to 5:00 pm every day without interruption. He ate little and suffered from frequent religious crises, but never renounced extramarital affairs even so. The most significant of these was his relationship with Maria Antonietta di Robilant (1804–1882), daughter of Friedrich Truchsess zu Waldburg (1776–1844), the Prussian ambassador to Turin and wife of Maurizio di Robilant (1798–1862).

=== Conflict with Louis Philippe's France ===
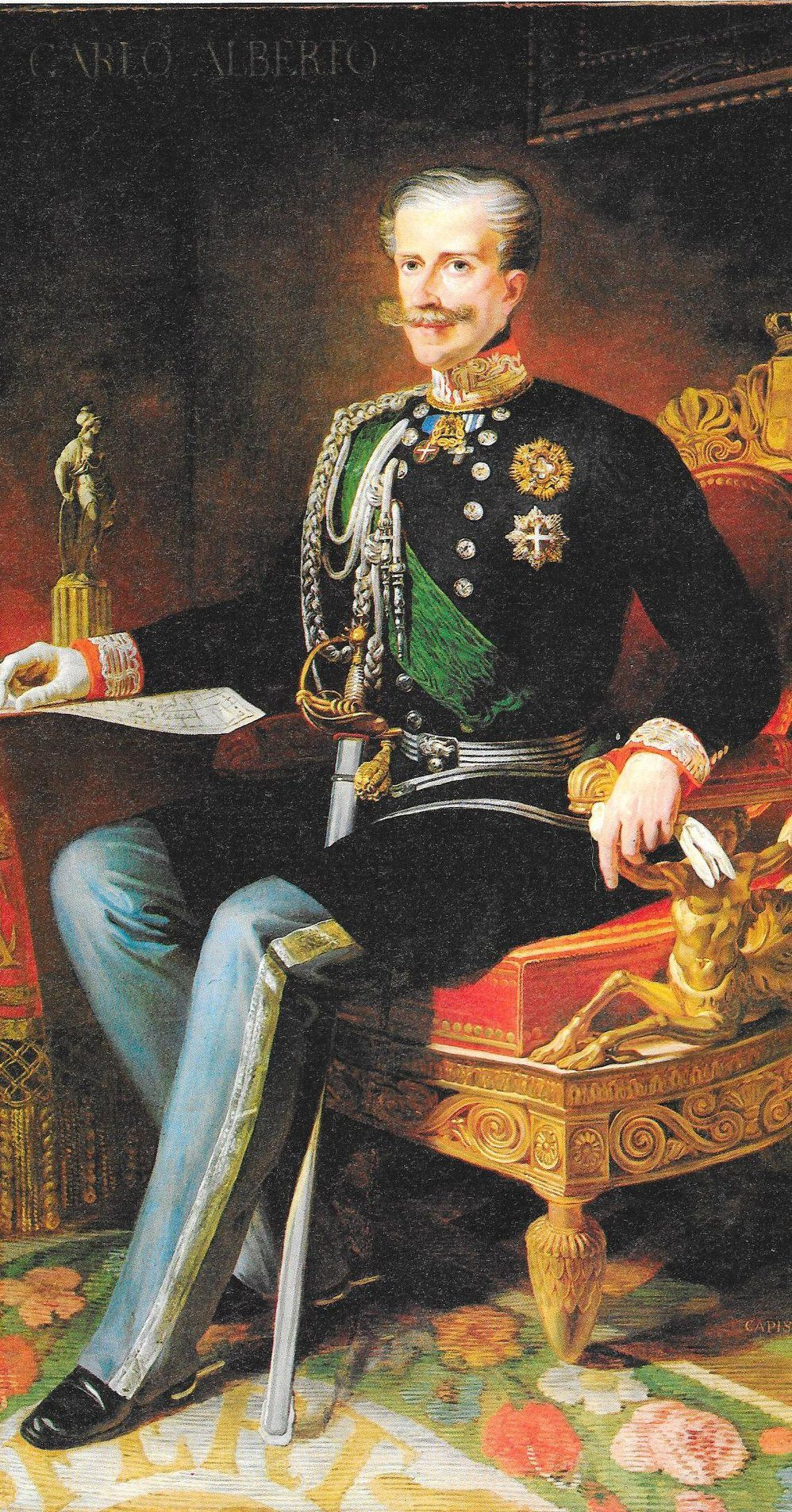
Charles Albert at a mature age

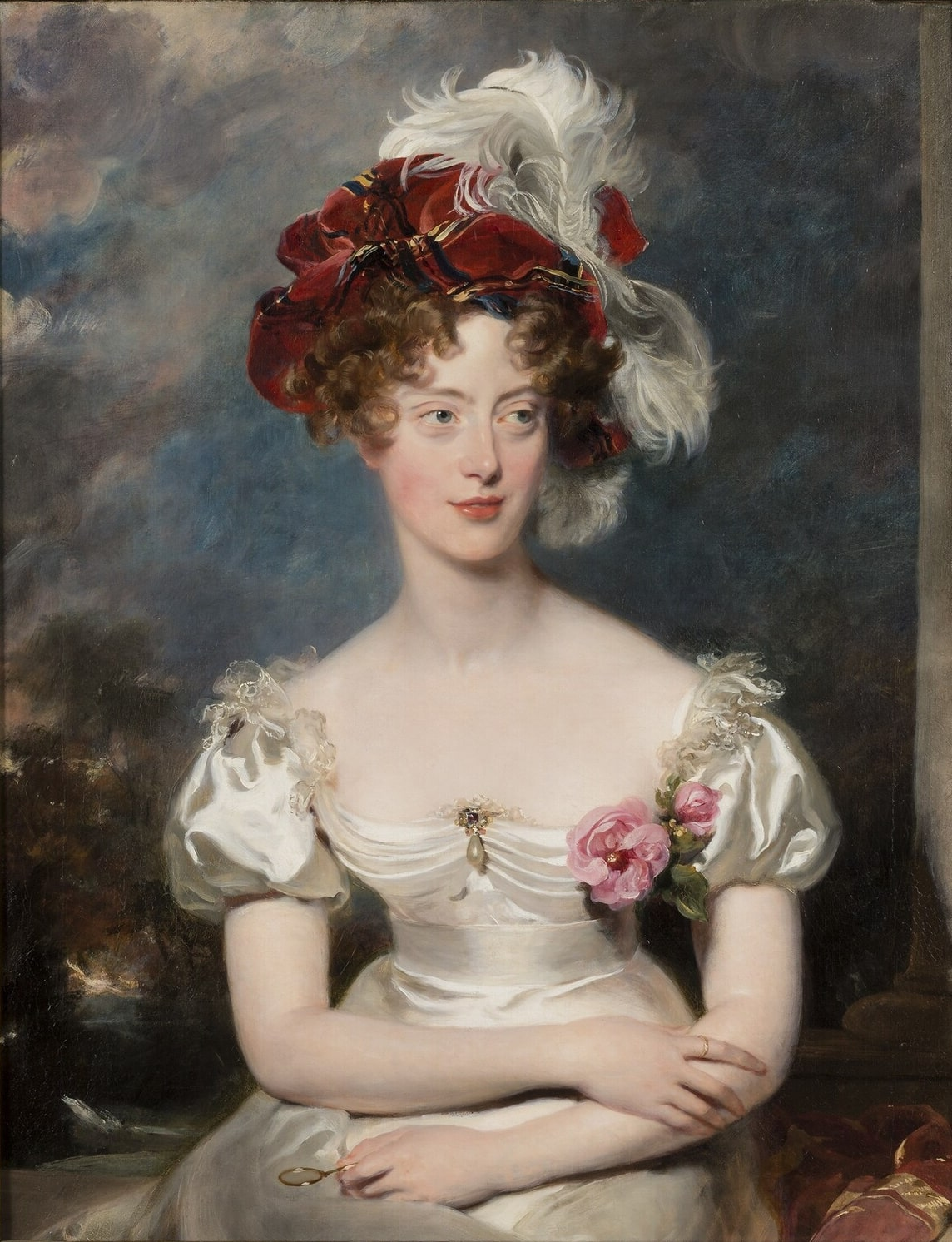
Marie-Caroline de Bourbon-Sicile, duchesse de Berry, whom Charles Albert assisted in a failed attempt to place a Bourbon on the French throne. Portrait of the Duchess of Berry, Thomas Lawrence, 1825.

The new king was affected by the July Revolution, which had deposed Charles X of France and led to the accession of Louis Philippe, an ex-revolutionary, and as a result, he decided to make an alliance with the Austrian Empire. The treaty, signed on 23 July 1831 and ratified in 1836, entrusted the defence of the Kingdom of Sardinia to Austria. However, in the event of war, the commander of the joint forces was to be Charles Albert. He wrote to the Austrian ambassador, Ludwig Senfft von Pilsach (1774–1853), "... the most beautiful day of my life will be the day on which there is war with France and I have the good fortune to serve in the Austrian army."

In accordance with this legitimist position, Charles Albert lent support to his close friend Marie-Caroline de Bourbon-Sicile, duchesse de Berry in December 1823 when she sought to place her son, Henri, on the French throne. She was the widow of the Duc de Berry, second son of Charles X, whose eldest son, Louis Antoine had renounced the throne. Henri's claim to the throne had been denied by the king.

Despite the advice of the French ambassador to exercise prudence, in 1832, Charles Albert loaned Marie-Caroline a million francs and placed a steamer at her disposal for transporting legitimist volunteers to France. The plot was discovered and failed; the steamer was stopped at Marseille and the volunteers were defeated at Vendée in a few hours. Marie-Caroline fled, but was soon arrested in Nantes and imprisoned in the Citadel of Blaye, near Bordeaux.

=== Philosophy of rule ===
Charles Albert displayed similar conservativism in internal politics. When the minister of war, Matteo Agnès Des Geneys (1763–1831) died, he replaced him with Carlo San Martino d'Aglie, who was not very popular at the time. He retained Vittorio Amedeo Sallier della Torre as Minister of Foreign Affairs until 1835, when he replaced him with the extremely conservative Clemente Solaro. These appointments were made with the intent of restoring a ministerial oligarchy. In 1831 he appointed Gaudenzio Maria Caccia, Count of Romentino (1765–1834) as minister of Finance, Giuseppe Barbaroux as Minister of Justice, and the reformer, Antonio Tonduti, Count of Escarèna (1771–1856), as minister of the Interior. On 5 April 1832, d'Aglie was replaced as Minister of War by Emanuele Pes di Villamarina.

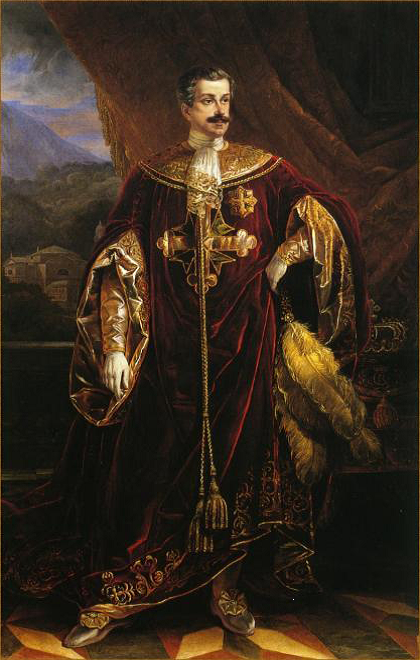
Charles Albert wearing the dresses of the Order of Saints Maurice and Lazarus

In June 1831, Giuseppe Mazzini, who was in exile in Marseille, addressed a letter to Charles Albert as "an Italian," in which he encouraged him to focus on the unification of Italy, in vain. For the moment, the new King of Sardinia cleaved to almost the same ideas as his predecessors.

=== Reforms and cultural initiatives ===
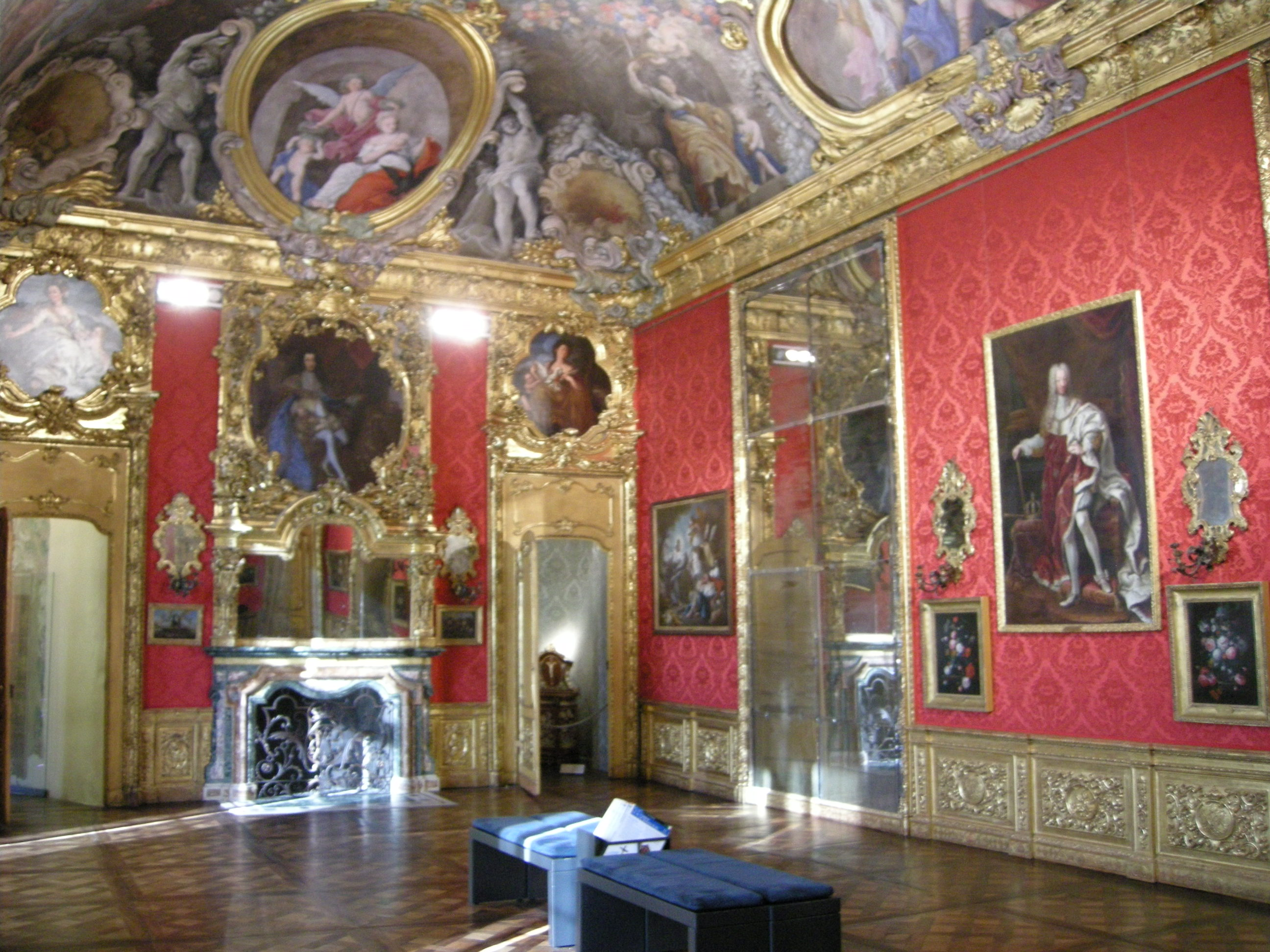
A room in the Turin City Museum of Ancient Art in the Palazzo Madama, founded by Charles Albert in 1832, as the Pinacoteca Regia e della Galleria Reale

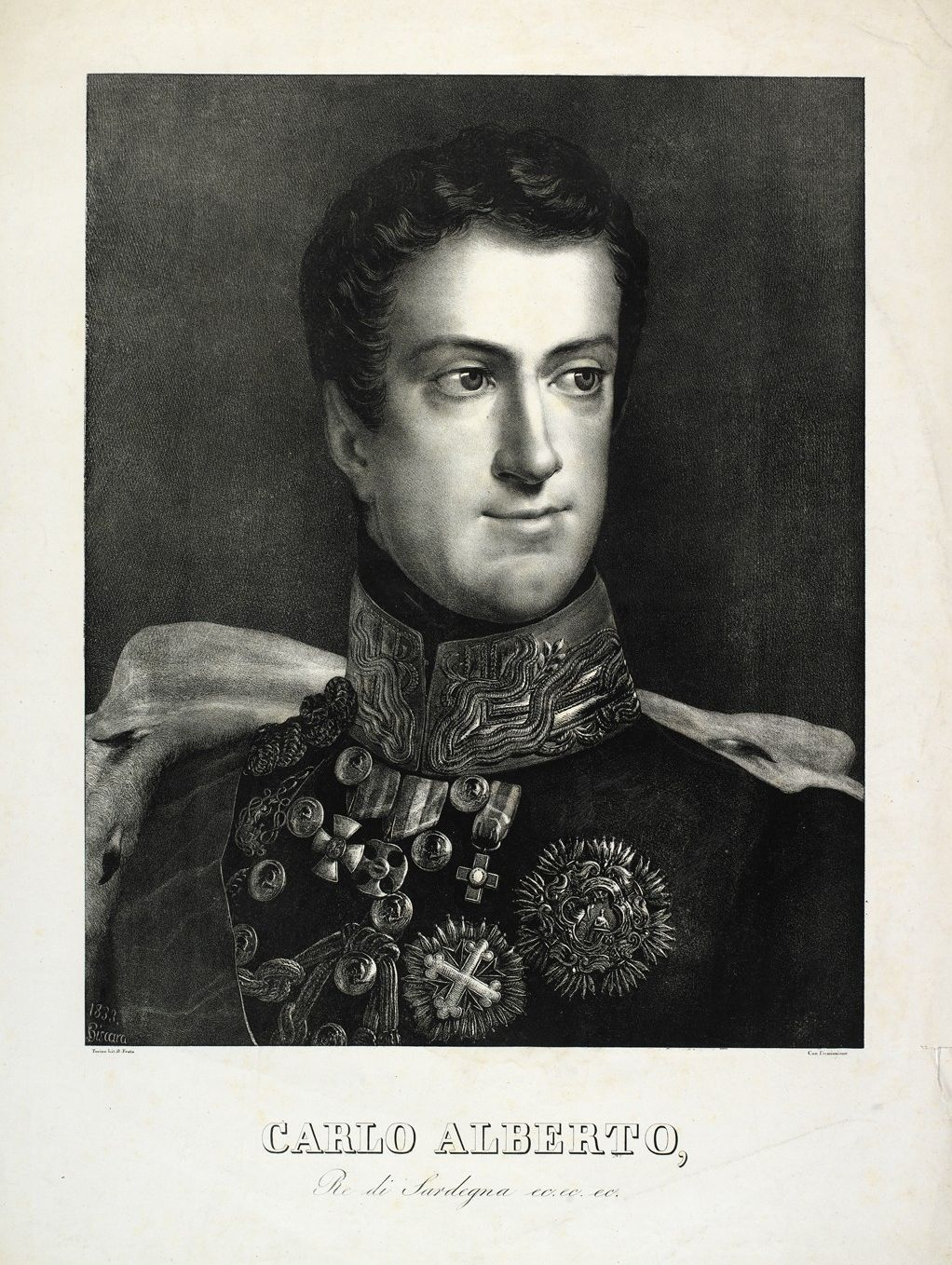
Charles Albert in 1833

Notwithstanding this conservatism, Charles Albert established a Council of State of 14 members who were to investigate the laws and make some moves to modernize the country. He abrogated the special exemptions on import duty for members of the royal family and royal officials, abolished torture, prohibited the mutilation of the corpses of executed criminals and the confiscation of the property of criminals. He also gave notable attention to culture. In 1832, he established the Pinacoteca Regia e della Galleria Reale in the Palazzo Madama (now the Turin City Museum of Ancient Art) and the library of the Palazzo Reale, he built several monuments and palaces, refounded the Academy of Art as the Accademia Albertina in 1833 and established the "Royal Foundation for the Study of the History of the Fatherland", which would become the model for all the similar foundations for historical studies established in the nineteenth century, in the same year.

Charles Albert accompanied these measures with an economic policy of liberalization of commerce. In 1834, the tax on grain was reduced and the next year, the export of raw silk was made legal. Duties on the import of raw materials (coal, metals, textiles) were subsequently reduced and the acquisition of industrial machinery from abroad was supported. Despite having impinged on some minor sources of state income, the balance of the kingdom was positive from 1835, and it was possible to entertain ambitions for the improvement of agriculture, roads, railroads, and ports.

Charles Albert also reformed the army, reformed the law codes, instituted a Court of cassation, and eliminated feudalism in Sardinia, in 1838. He enabled the opening of institutes of credit, reformed the public agencies and the state, and reduced the control of the religious hierarchy somewhat. The royal court was full of clerics—at least fifty of them—and the court was sumptuous for such a small kingdom. There were a great number of cooks, butlers, waiters, carpenters, squires, stallers, pages, footmen, masters of ceremonies, etc.

=== Support for Spanish and Portuguese reactionaries ===
After the death of king Ferdinand VII of Spain, the nation was divided into two factions: the anti-liberal reactionaries who supported the legitimist aspirations of Don Carlos and the constitutionalists who defended Maria Christina's regency on behalf of Isabella II. The Holy Alliance of Russia, Austria, and Prussia supported Don Carlos; Great Britain, France and Portugal supported the constitutionalists. Charles Albert sides with the former group, but in the Carlist War of 1833–1840, the constitutionalists prevailed. Similarly, in the Portuguese Liberal Wars (1828–1834), which followed the death of John VI, Charles Albert sided with the absolutists under Dom Miguel, who spent time in Piedmont. In this case, too, the liberals, led by Dom Miguel's brother Dom Pedro, enjoyed the support of Great Britain and Louis-Philippe's France and were ultimately successful.

=== Opposition to "Young Italy" ===
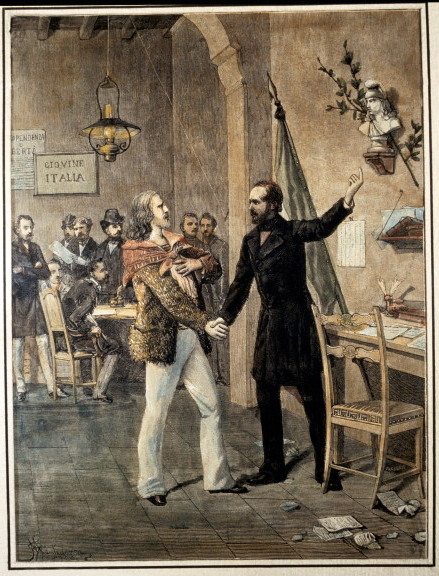
The meeting of Mazzini and Garibaldi at the headquarters of "Young Italy" in Marseille 1833. Both of them plotted against Charles Albert and his kingdom and were condemned to death in absentia.

At the time of Charles Albert's ascent to the throne in 1831, there were riots in Rome, the carbonari revolt of Ciro Menotti in Modena, and an insurrection in Bologna and Parma which led to the flight of Francis IV and Marie Louise. Austria was able to restore order and Charles Albert decided that his alliance with the Habsburgs was essential. The Kingdom of Sardinia was also troubled by the plots of revolutionaries in these years, and even by an attempted invasion. In April 1833, in Genoa, two low-ranking officers were arrested for a scuffle and it was discovered that they belonged to Giuseppe Mazzini's Young Italy. They supplied various names and investigations were expanded to other garrisons. Charles Albert, who considered Mazzini's association the "most terrible and bloody", ordered the investigation to continue until it got to the bottom of the matter, acting in accordance with the law but with the utmost severity.

In the end, twelve people were executed by firing squad, and two committed suicide in jail. Twenty-one were condemned to death but could not be executed because they had escaped or, like Mazzini, had been abroad the whole time. Charles Albert granted no pardons, and the ambassadors of France and Britain in Turin protested at court about the severity of the punishment and the lack of any mercy. The King of Sardinia showed his gratitude to the investigators by granting honours to those who had played a leading role in the repression.

Since the insurrections had failed, Mazzini began to plan a military expedition. In 1834, he attempted to organize a force in Switzerland, which would attack Savoy (then part of the Savoyard state) and the population would simultaneously rise against the king. But information about this plan was leaked and Charles Albert arranged an ambush. The invasion, undertaken on 2 February 1834, failed completely. This was partly due to disorganization, and partially to Swiss efforts to prevent Mazzini's expedition. Only a few conspirators attacked a barracks in Les Échelles. Two of them were captured and executed by firing squad. Carabiniere Giovanni Battista Scapaccino was killed in the process, and to honour him Charles Albert instituted the first gold medal in Italian history. Meanwhile, Giuseppe Garibaldi, who was preparing to lead a rising in the city, received a report that it was all over and fled. He was condemned to death in absentia.

=== Law reform ===
In these circumstances, Charles Albert realized the necessity of granting reforms to make the kingdom more modern and to satisfy the needs of the populace. Immediately on ascending to the throne he had named a commission which had been tasked with creating new civil, criminal, commercial and procedural laws. This process of reform took a very long time, but eventually, on 20 June 1837, the new civil code, partially inspired by the Napoleonic Code, was promulgated. The king also participated in the drafting of the new criminal code, which was published on 26 October 1839. During the process, Charles Albert insisted on the concept of corrective justice, limiting the death penalty as much as possible. Nevertheless, he ordained very severe penalties for those guilty of sacrilege or suicide (whose last wills and testaments had no legal power). In 1842, finally, the commercial code and the code of criminal procedure, with innovative guarantees of the rights of the accused, were promulgated.

=== Beginning of crisis with Austria ===
In 1840 the Oriental Crisis, which placed Louis Philippe's France in conflict with the other European great powers, inspired Charles Albert to begin thinking about a program of territorial expansion in the Po valley. In the same year, a commercial crisis erupted between Turin and Vienna, regarding an old treaty in which the Kingdom of Sardinia undertook not to provide salt to Switzerland. Following the breach of this treaty, Austria increased the customs duty on Piedmontese wine entering Lombardy-Veneto by 100%. Charles Albert's response was to threaten to build a railroad from Genoa to Lake Maggiore, in order to capture the German commerce which sustained the Austrian port of Trieste for the Ligurian ports.

These were still only minor disputes and diplomatic relations between the two states continued to be generally good, culminating in the magnificent wedding of Charles Albert's eldest son, Victor Emmanuel and Adelaide of Austria, daughter of Ranier Joseph of Habsburg-Lorraine, who was the Austrian Viceroy in Lombardy-Veneto and Charles Albert's brother-in-law, since he had married his sister Elisabeth in 1820. Victor Emmanuel and Adelaide were thus first cousins.

== Liberal sovereign (1845–1849) ==
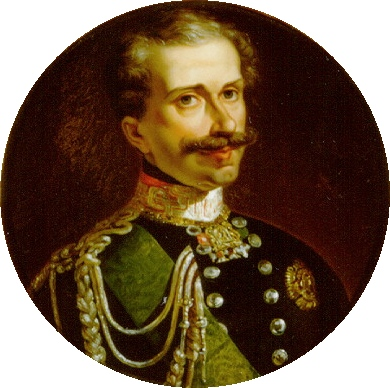
Carlo Alberto in the Anti-Austrian period

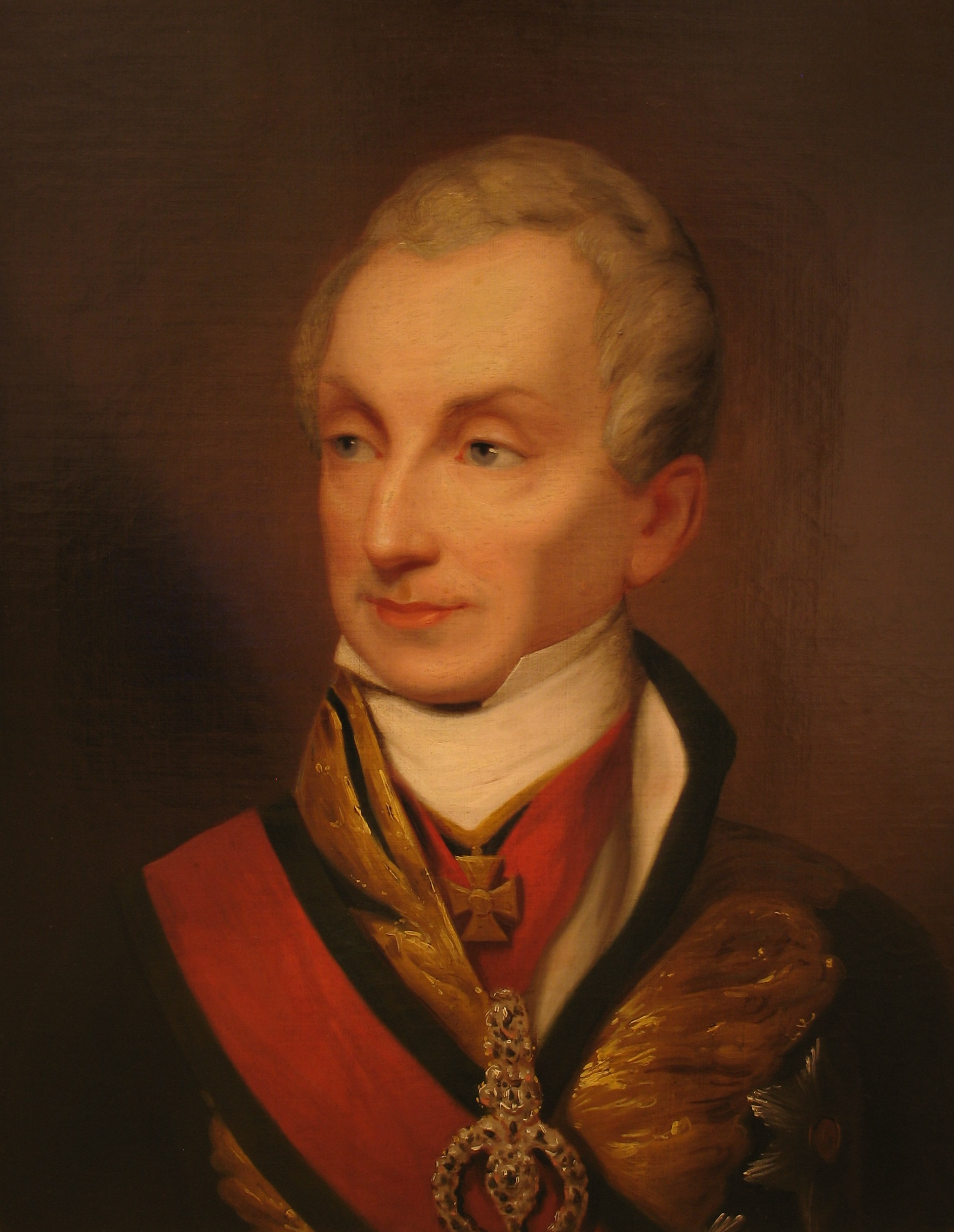
The elderly Austrian chancellor, Klemens von Metternich, who requested clarification on the policy of the Kingdom of Sardinia in 1846

In 1845, revolutionary movements erupted in Rimini and in the Papal States. To Massimo d'Azeglio, who had gone to report on the events, Charles Albert said, "that on the day of conflict with Austria, he would throw himself in with his sons, with his army, with all his substance, to fight for the independence of Italy."

On 8 June 1846, on the orders of Chancellor Metternich, the Austrian ambassador to Turin, Karl Ferdinand von Buol, asked Charles Albert to clarify his position on whether he was with Austria or with the revolutionaries. The King of Sardinia hesitated. In the meanwhile, on 16 June, Pope Pius IX had been elected as Pope. His first order of business was to grant an amnesty to those condemned of political crimes. The new pope then protested against Austria for having occupied Ferrara, in the Holy See, without its consent. Charles Albert, who saw in Pius IX a way of reconciling his loyalty with his old liberal ideas, wrote to him offering his support.

In the same way, in September 1847, Cesare Trabucco, Charles Albert's secretary, was authorized to write a letter on 2 September, in which the king expressed his hope that God would grant him the power to undertake a war of independence in which he would take command of the army and the Guelph cause. These declarations made Charles Albert far more popular. However, he continued to break up anti-Austrian demonstrations because the court and government remained divided. De La Tour, Foreign Minister Solaro della Margarita, and Archbishop Luigi Fransoni considered the anti-Austrian policy exceptionally dangerous, but it was supported by Minister of War Emanuele Pes di Villamarina, Cesare Alfieri di Sostegno, Cesare Balbo, Massimo and Roberto d'Azeglio, and the young Count Cavour.

Meanwhile, the demands of the people became pressing and were not always accepted. In this period, for example, Charles Albert did not accept a Genoese delegation which called for the expulsion of the Jesuits from the Kingdom, whom he had already banned from political writings. He did, however, implement the so-called Perfect Fusion of the Savoyard state on 29 November 1847, which extended the reforms carried out on the mainland to the island of Sardinia. At the beginning of 1848, news arrived that following the outbreak of the Spring of Nations, Ferdinand II had granted a constitution in the Kingdom of the Two Sicilies. In Turin there were acclamations for the King of Naples and the Pope, while Charles Albert remained bound by the oath he had sworn to Charles Felix to respect religiously all the fundamental laws of the monarchy, and to retain absolutist rule.

=== Albertine Statute ===
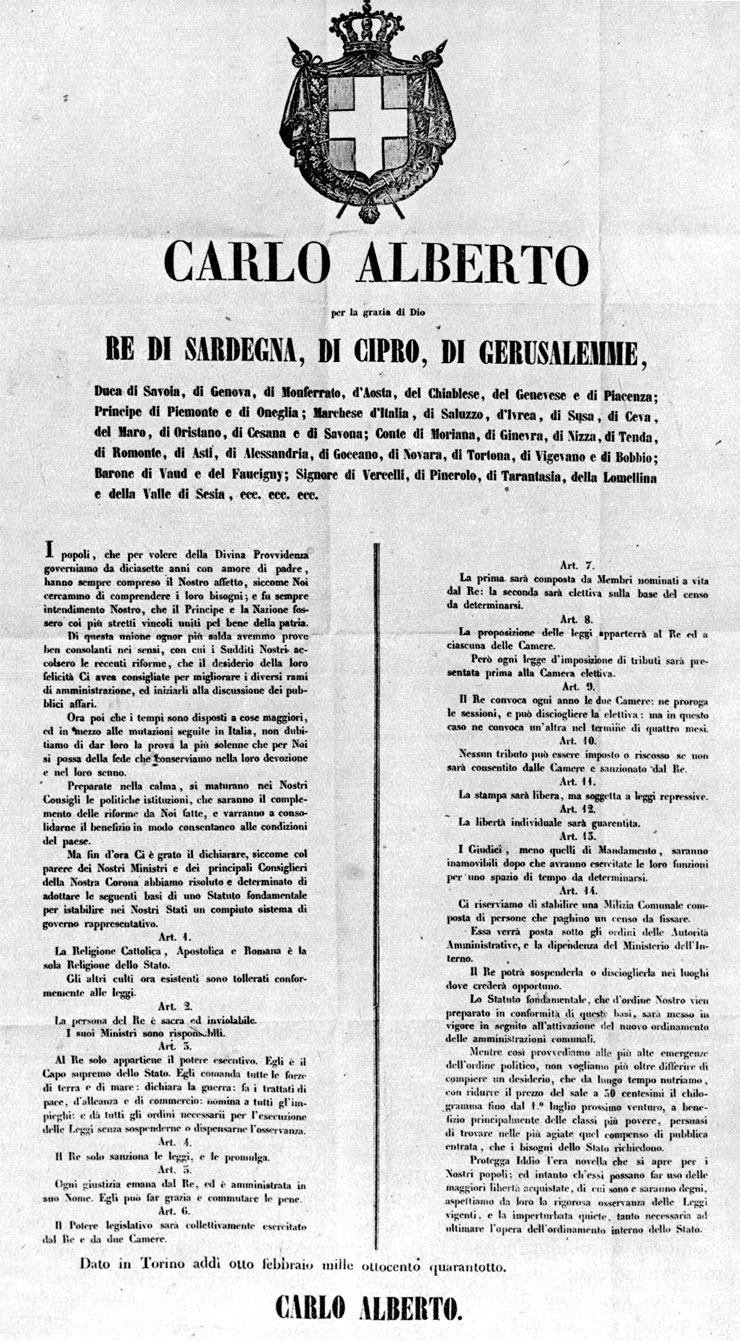
Edict of 8 February 1848 which informed the public of the concession of the Statute and outlined its contents in 14 articles

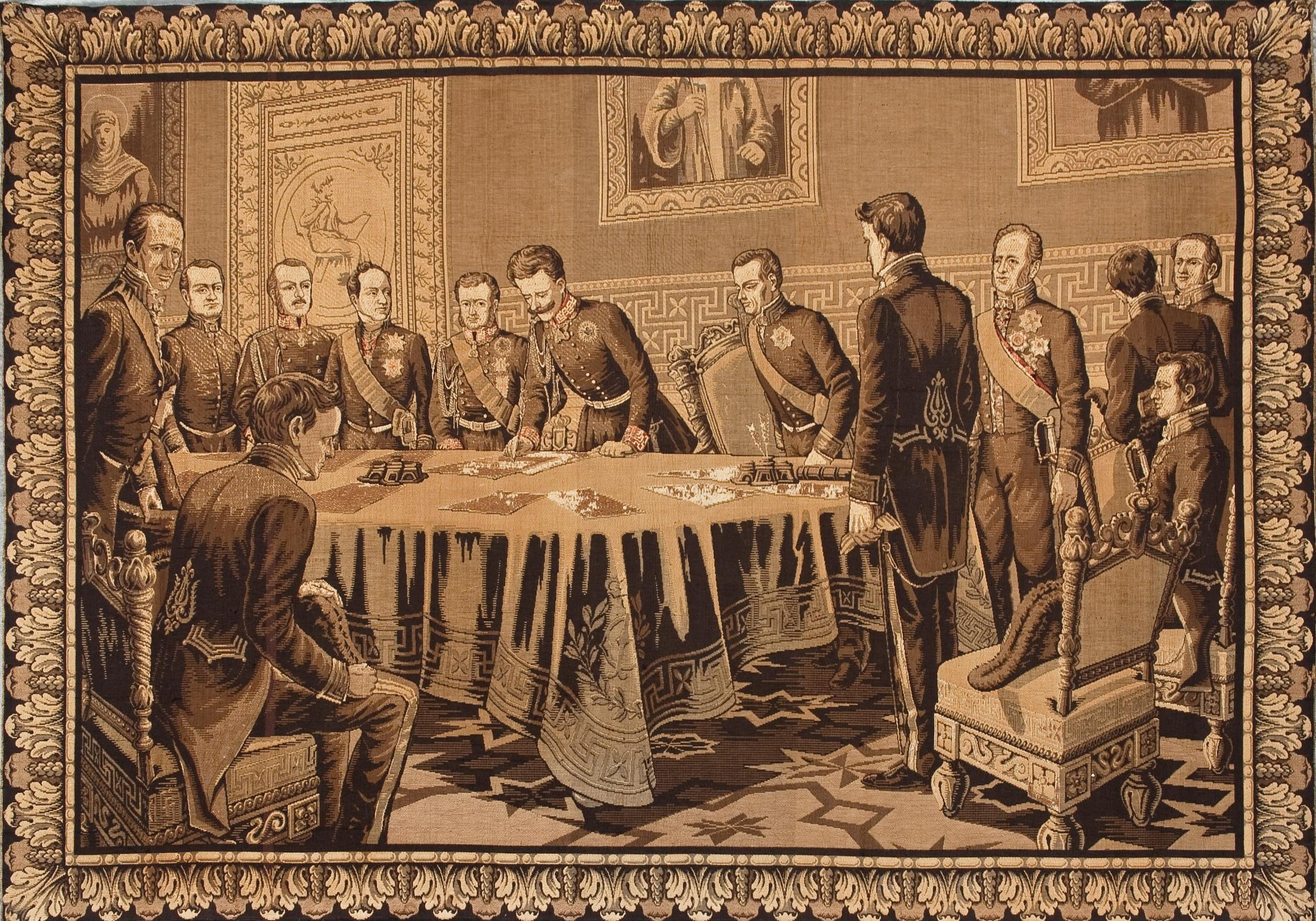
Charles Albert signs the Statute on 8 March 1848

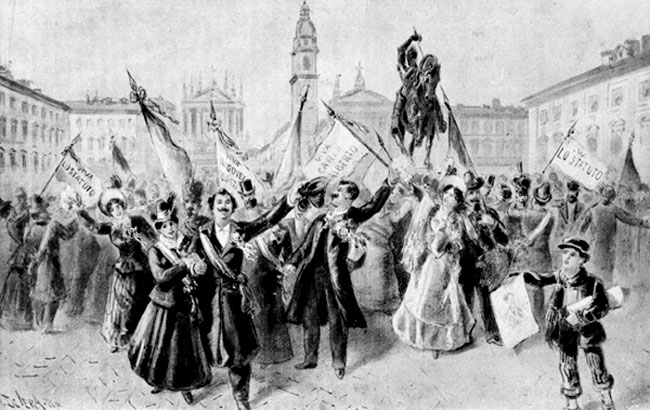
Celebrations in the Piazza San Carlo in Turin at the proclamation of the Albertine Statute in a contemporary print

On 7 January 1848, at the hotel Europa in Turin, there was a meeting of the city's journalists at which Cavour, director of the Risorgimento, proposed to request a constitution from the king. The majority of the ministers were also in favour of the concession of a constitution, and of ensuring that one was not imposed by the people. Charles Albert was not sure what to do, unwilling to make the wrong decision and considered abdicating as Victor Emmanuel I had in similar circumstances. He sent for his son to prepare him for the succession, but his son managed to convince him to retain his position.

On 7 February, an extraordinary Council of State was convented. Seven ministers, the holders of the order of the Annunciation, and other high dignitaries were present. All of them spoke and the discussion went on for many hours. Charles Albert, pale, listened in silence. De La Tour, Carlo Giuseppe Beraudo di Pralormo, and Luigi Provana di Collegno were opposed to the constitution. During the lunch break, Charles Albert received a delegation from the capital, which asked for the constitution for the good of the people and in order to safeguard order.

It was now necessary to make a decision and, at last, Giacinto Borelli, Minister of the Interior, was appointed to draft the Constitution immediately. The document was approved and was named the "Statute." Charles Albert had stated that he would not approve the document if it did not clearly state the pre-eminent position of the Catholic religion and the honour of the monarchy. Since he had received these things, he approved it. The meeting was dissolved at dawn.

Around 3:30 in the afternoon on 8 February, a royal edict was published in the streets of Turin, which laid out the 14 articles which formed the basis of the Statute for a system of representative government. By 6:00 pm, the city was entirely lit up and massive demonstrations in favour of Charles Albert were held.

The edict specified that the Catholic faith was the sole state religion, and that executive power belonged to the king, as did command of the armed forces. Legislative power was vested in two chambers, one of which would be elected. The free press and individual liberty were guaranteed. The full version of the Statute, with all its articles, was finally agreed on 4 March 1848 and approved the same day by Charles Albert. The announcement of the Statute was met with great enthusiasm throughout Piedmont. The first constitutional government, presided over by Cesare Balbo, was sworn in on 16 March 1848, two days before the beginning of the Five Days of Milan.

=== Spring of Nations ===
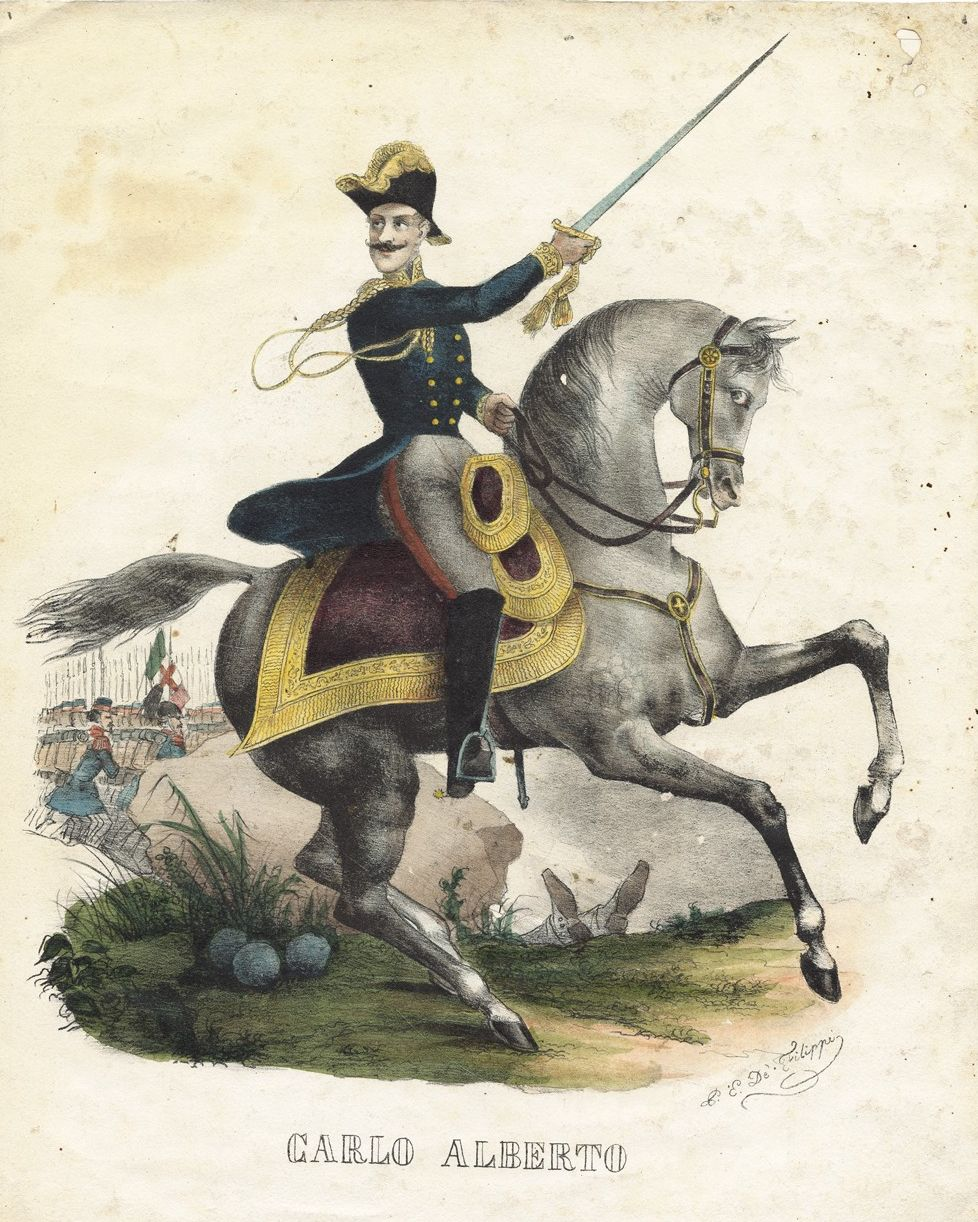
Charles decided to adhere to the idea of a united Italian federation under the influence of the Pope.

Italy in 1843, during Charles Albert's reign

Elected in 1846, the new pope Pius IX had caught the imagination of the liberals of Italy when he began to dismantle the archaic Vatican institutions: granting a free press, instituting the civic guard in place of foreign mercenaries, and creating a council of ministers. On 12 January 1848, there was a revolt in Palermo and King Ferdinand II of the Two Sicilies was forced to concede a constitution, but all of Europe was further convulsed when, in February 1848, there was a Revolution in France, King Louis Philippe was deposed, and a Republic was established. The revolution spread to Milan on 18 March, then to Venice, and finally to Vienna, where riots forced Metternich to flee and the abdication of Emperor Ferdinand I.

In Milan, it was expected that Charles Albert would take the opportunity to declare war on Austria. A clear message from Turin was delivered by the Milanese liberal, Francesco Arese Lucini on 19/20 March:

You may be assured, sirs, that I am giving every possible provision: that I burn with desire to bring to your aid all that is in my power and that I will grasp even the smallest pretext that presents itself.

Although the Kingdom's resources were small, the Piedmontese army began to mobilize. The majority of the troops were deployed on the western border since the eastern border was safeguarded by the treaty of alliance with Austria. But Charles Albert realised that this was a unique opportunity to expand his holdings into Lombardy. Thus he told the Milanese that he would intervene on their behalf if they agreed to join the Kingdom of Sardinia.

On 23 March 1848, the Piedmontese embassy to Milan returned to Turin with news that the Austrians had been forced to evacuate the city and that a provisional government headed by Gabrio Casati had been established, which asked Charles Albert to become an ally. Clearly not very enthusiastic about the idea of annexation, the Milanese asked the king to keep his troops outside the city and to adopt the tricolour of the Cisalpine Republic as his flag. Although he had received no guarantee that the Milanese would agree to annexation, Charles Albert accepted the conditions of the Milanese and asked only that the flag of the house of Savoy be placed in the middle of the tricolour (This would henceforth be the flag of the Kingdom of Sardinia and then the Kingdom of Italy until the fall of the monarchy in 1946). He was about to enter into a war with a major power, whose troops in Italy were commanded by one of the greatest living generals, Joseph Radetzky von Radetz. His reactionary past forgotten, the king appeared on the balcony of the royal palace, flanked by the Milanese representatives, waving the tricolour, while the people applauded and shouted, "Long live Italy! Long live Charles Albert. Within a year his reign would be over.

=== First Italian War of Independence ===
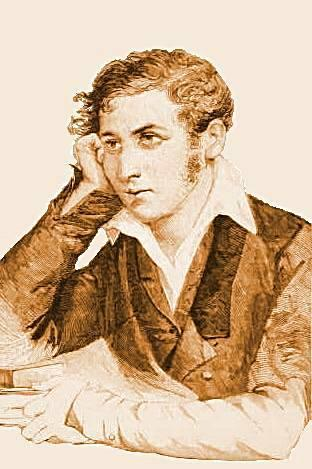
The Milanese Carlo Cattaneo criticized Charles Albert's tardiness in deciding to enter the war.

On 23 March 1848, the proclamation of Charles Albert to the people of Lombardy and Veneto was published, in which he assured them that the Piedmontese troops, "... go now to offer, in the final trials, that help which a brother expects from a brother, a friend from a friend. We will comply with your just requests, trusting in the aid of God, who is clearly with us, of God, who has given Italy Pius IX, of God, whose miraculous prompting places Italy in the position to act for itself." Thus, the war began. The federalist Carlo Cattaneo was not impressed, "Now that the enemy is in flight, the king wants to come with the whole army. He should have sent us anything − even a single cart of powder − three days ago. There was heard, in Piedmont, for five days, the thundering of the guns which consumed us: The king knew and did not move."

==== Initial campaign ====
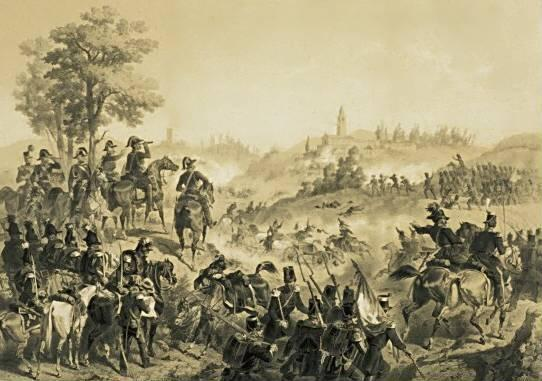
Charles Albert (with the spyglass) and the Piedmontese commanders at the Battle of Pastrengo

Charles Albert left Turin on the evening of 26 March 1848 for Alessandria, to take command of the army and then advanced to Voghera. He was preoccupied with the delay of the provisional government of Milan's acceptance of annexation by the Kingdom of Sardinia. The Austrians however had regrouped on the River Mincio, at one corner of the Quadrilatero. On 29 March, the king entered Pavia in triumph, where he was met by some envoys of the Milanese government. On 2 April, Charles Albert was in Cremona, on 5 April at Bozzolo, on 6 April at Asola, on 8 April at Castiglione delle Stiviere, and on 11 April at Volta Mantovana, only four kilometres from the Mincio. After nearly two weeks, he had made it to the front.

At the opening of hostilities, on 8 and 9 April, Italian sharpshooters had achieved success in the first battle of the campaign at the Battle of Goito. After crossing the Mincio with his army, Charles Albert achieved another victory on 30 April at Pastrengo, where he saw the front lines. The units under his command attacked some Austrians who had been dispersed by a charge of the carabinieri on horseback. On 2 May, in the midst of this triumphant atmosphere, news arrived that Pius IX had withdrawn his military and political support for the Italian cause.

Nevertheless, the Papal soldiers in the army did not withdraw, choosing to remain to fight as volunteers, but Charles Albert had lost the moral justification for his mission. His dream of becoming the sword of the papacy and king of an Italy united under the Pope, as Vincenzo Gioberti had proposed, was thwarted. Yet the king was undiscouraged and continued to advance towards Verona, where a harsh and indecisive battle was fought with the Austrians at Santa Lucia on 6 May.

Two further events followed in the next few days. On 21 May, the contingent of 14,000 men from the Neapolitan army which were en route to fight against the Austrians, were ordered by Ferdinand II to return home in light of Pius IX's decision. Then on 25 May, the Austrian reinforcements which had been traveling through Veneto, joined Radetzky's troops at Verona. Charles Albert was ambitious but had only modest strategic abilities and he could not realistically continue the war alone. The Battle of Goito and the surrender of Peschiera on 30 May were his last successes. The Austrians conquered Vicenza on 10 June, dispersing the Papal volunteers and finally obtained a decisive victory over the Piedmontese in the Battle of Custoza, which lasted from the 22 to 27 July.

In the meantime, on 8 June, the Milanese and Lombards had voted with an overwhelming majority to join the Kingdom of Sardinia, as had the citizens of the Duchy of Parma on 2 May. But for Charles Albert, things were going sour: the soldiers were angry about the recent defeat and were hungry and exhausted. A council of war suggested seeking a truce.

==== Events in Milan and armistice of Salasco ====
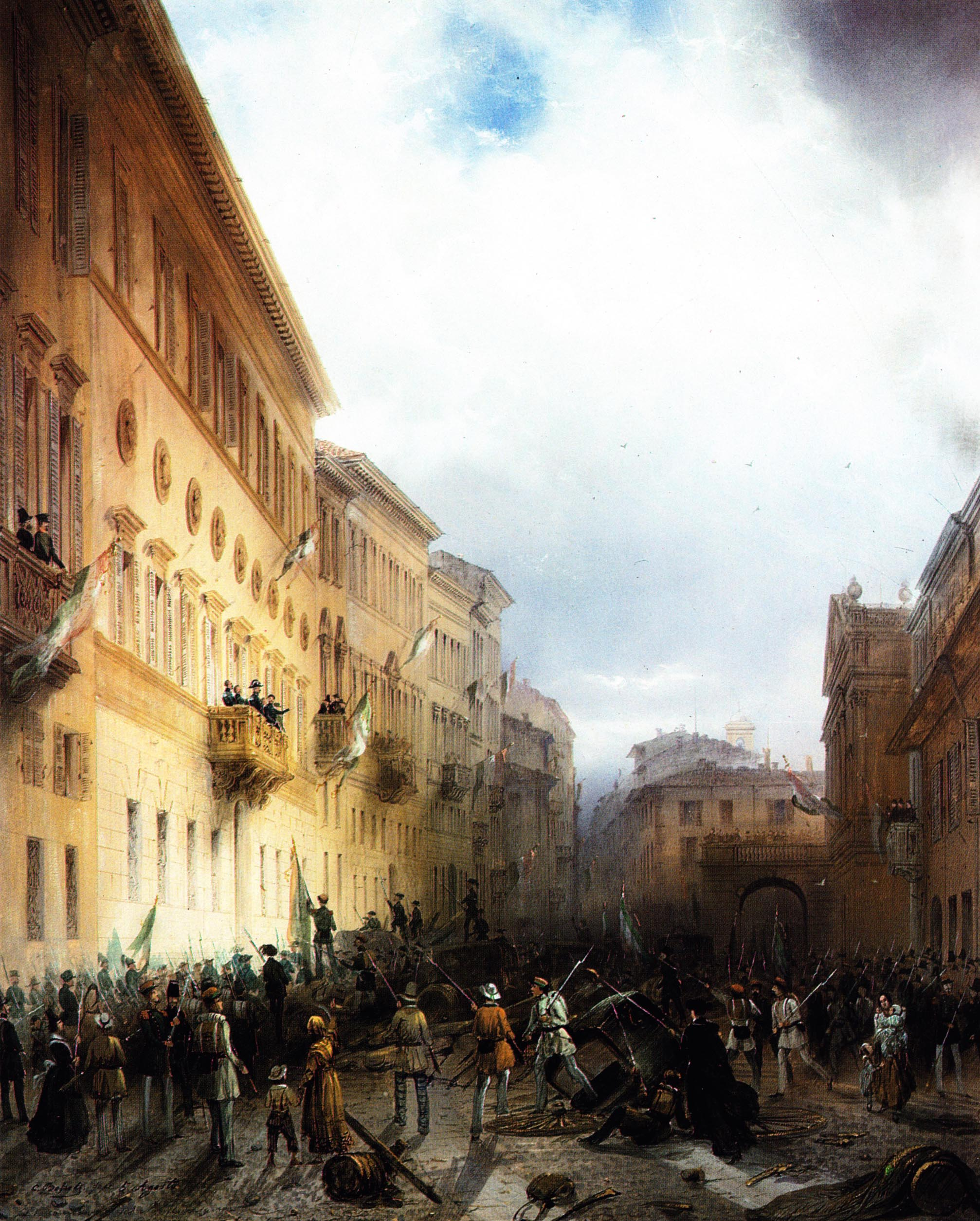
Charles Albert on the balcony of the Palazzo Greppi in Milan on 5 August 1848, attempting to calm forces opposed to the surrender of the city; painting by Carlo Bossoli.

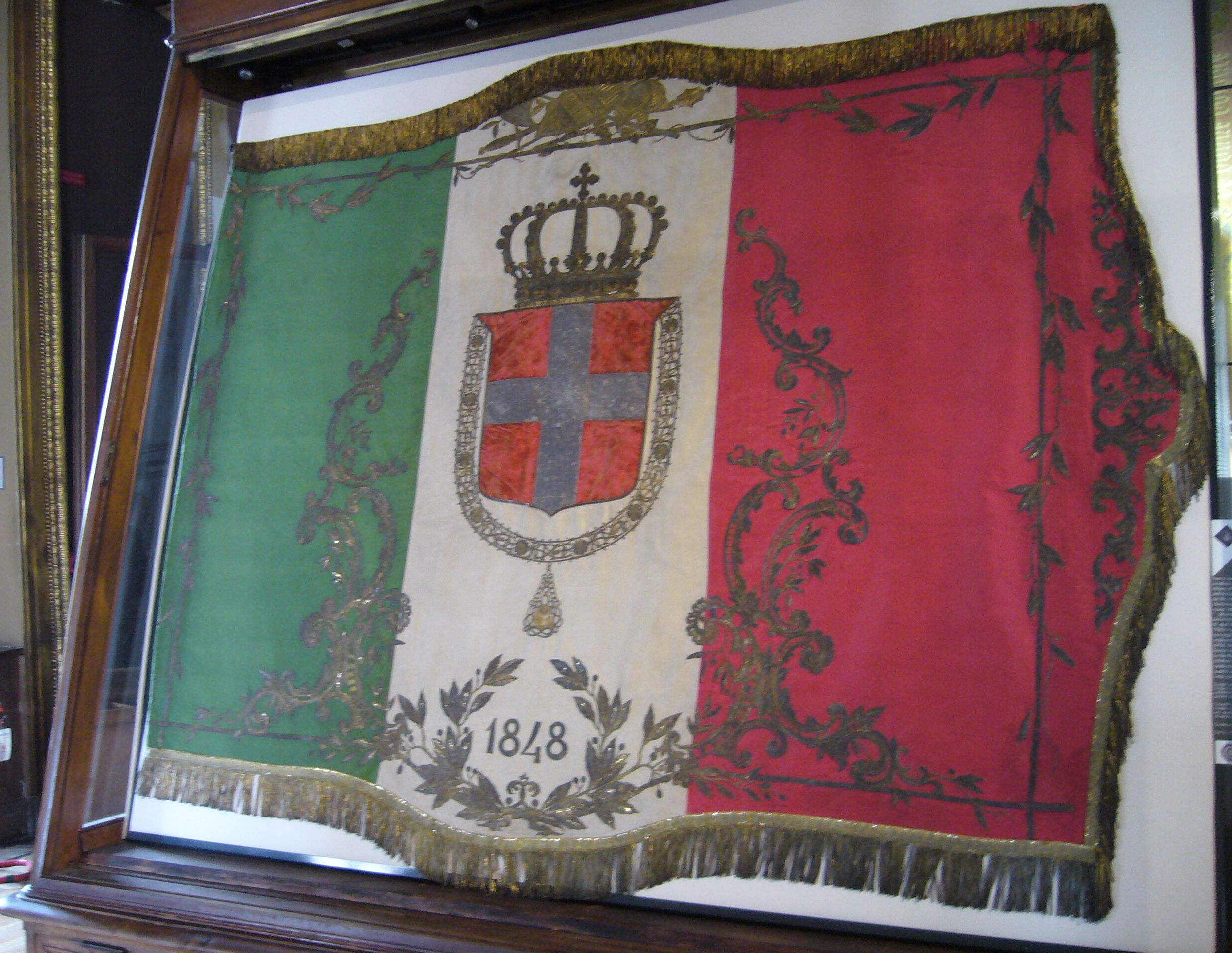
Flag donated by the women of Milan in the summer of 1848. Displayed in the Royal Armoury of Turin.

On the evening of 27 July 1848, the Austrians agreed to grant a truce if the Piedmontese withdrew to the west bank of the Adda (a little more than 20 km east of Milan), surrendered all the fortresses, including Peschiera and yielded the Duchies of Parma and Modena, whose rulers had been forced into exile. Charles Albert, who disagreed with his son Victor Emmanuel on the conduct of the war, exclaimed "I would rather die!" and prepared to make a stand at the Oglio (about 25 km further east than requested by Radetzky).

Although the Austrian proposal had been rejected, his troops ended up having to withdraw to the Adda river anyway, because the Oglio river was held to be an inadequate defensive line. At the river Adda, some manoeuvres taken by a general on his own initiative left a division isolated and made it necessary to withdraw again, in order to retreat inside the walls of Milan. Charles Albert went to the Palazzo Greppi, ignoring the Milanese desire to resist, he negotiated the surrender of the city to the Austrians in exchange for permitting the safe withdrawal of the army to Piedmont.

The next day, the Milanese learned of the agreement and revealed their fury. The crowd protested in front of the Palazzo Greppi and when the King came out on the balcony, they fired their rifles at him. According to the noblewoman Cristina Trivulzio di Belgiojoso, who participated actively in the riots in Milan:

A contingent of the national guard went up to interrogate Charles Albert on the reason for the surrender. He turned them away, but was forced despite himself to follow some deputies onto the balcony, from which he spoke to the people, apologizing for his ignorance of the true feelings of the Milanese, saying that he was delighted that they came to the defence so quickly, and solemnly promising to strive for them with his last drop of blood. A round from a rifle was fired against Charles Albert. At the final words of his speech, the indignant crowd shouted "If you're so wounded from surrendering!" Then the king took a piece of paper from his pocket, which he held up for the people to see, and ripped it to pieces.

Charles Albert's second son Ferdinand and general Alfonso Ferrero La Marmora carried the king to safety. In the night he departed from Milan with the army. On 8 August, general Carlo Canera di Salasco returned to Milan and negotiated an armistice with the Austrians, known as the Armistice of Salasco, which was signed on 9 August. Charles Albert ratified the armistice despite some opposition, including from Gioberti, who remained confident of aid from France. The king said that the former French foreign minister, Alphonse de Lamartine, had declared that the French would only give such aid to Republicans.

==== Second campaign and abdication ====
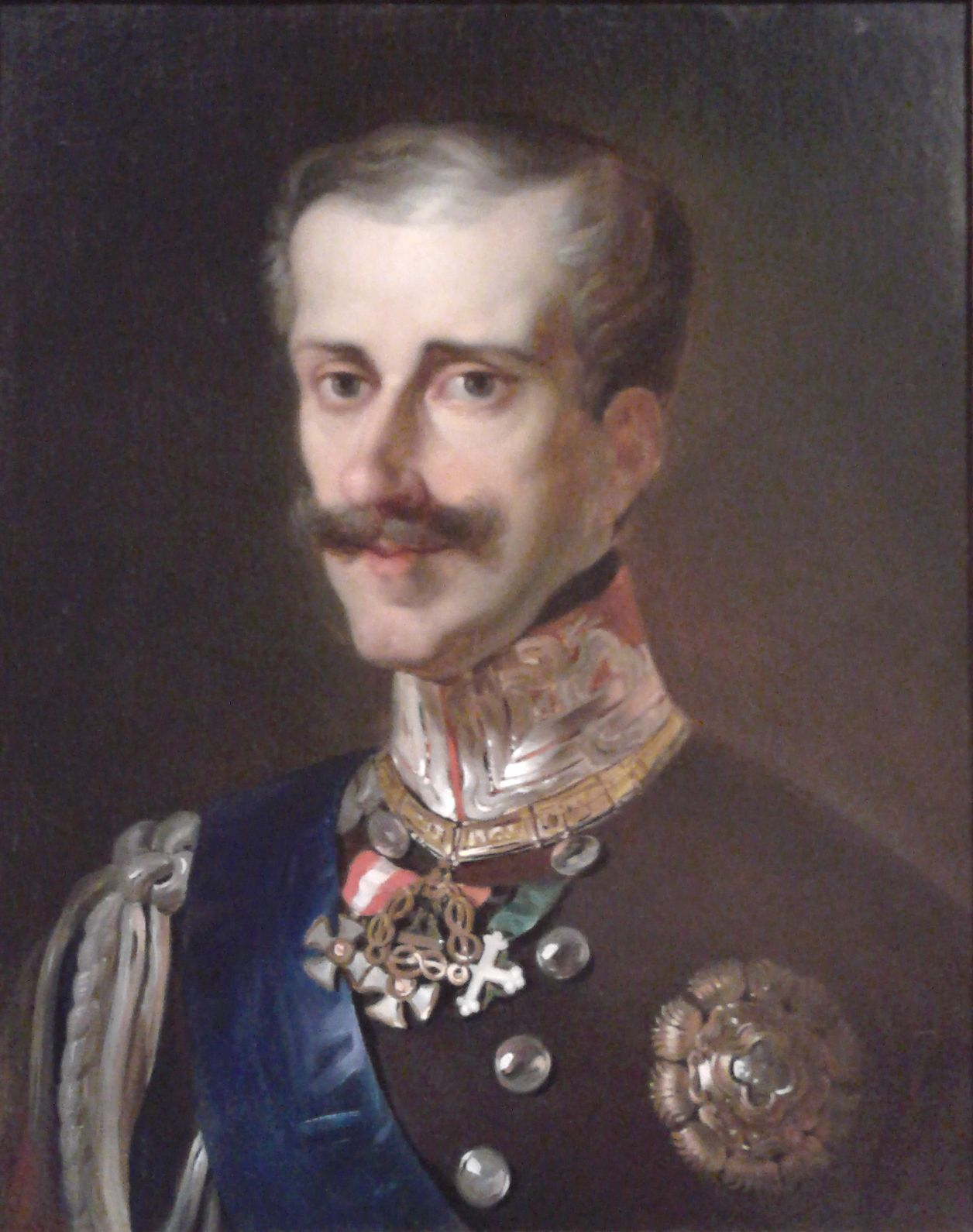
Charles Albert reopened hostilities with Austria on 20 March 1849, but the second campaign lasted only four days.

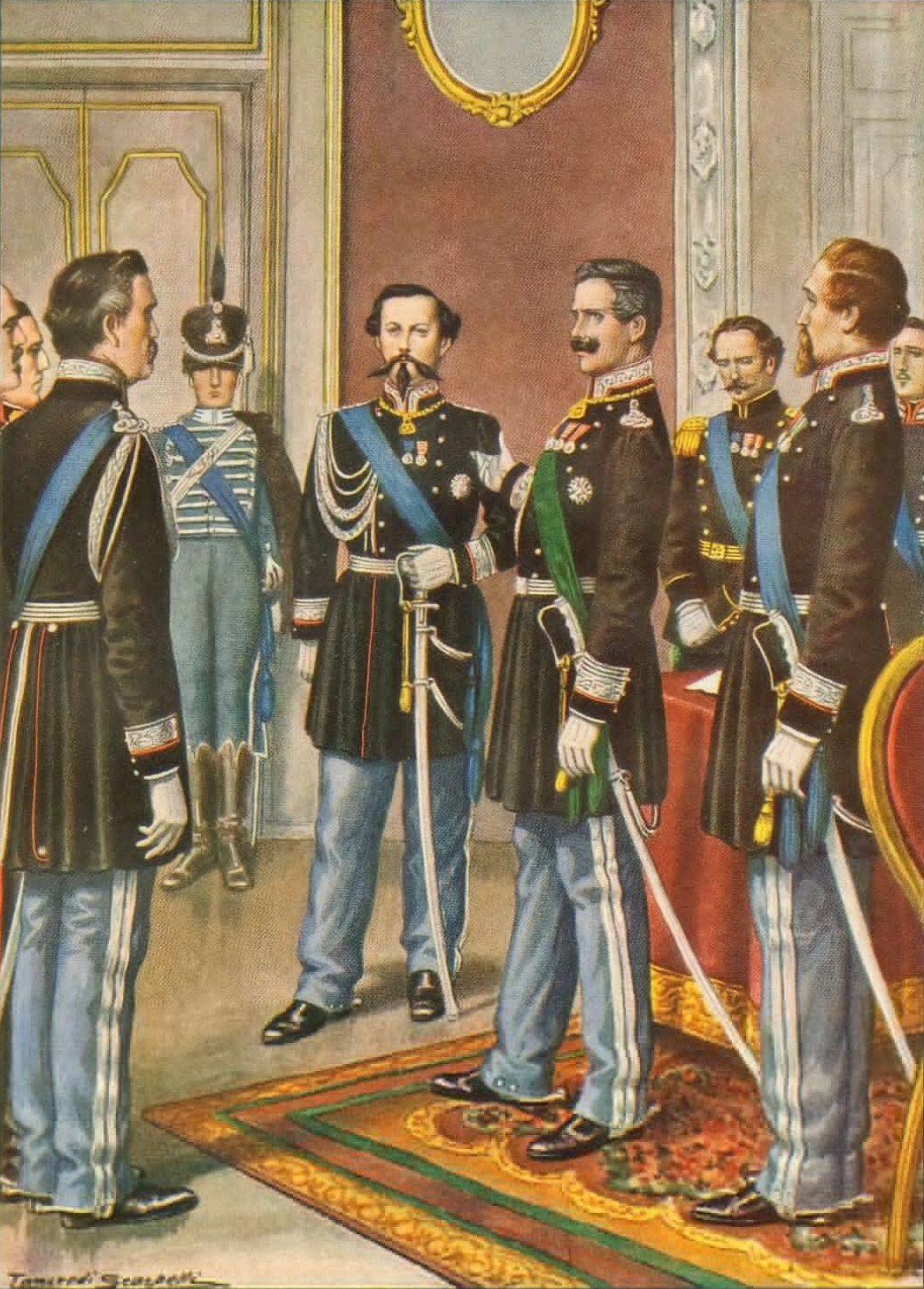
Charles Albert abdicates in favour of his son Victor Emmanuel

The king was not proud of the campaign and, once he had written a record of the first campaign, Charles Albert decided to break the armistice. On 1 March, at the inauguration of the legislature, he spoke clearly about war and Chamber responded positively. For the imminent resumption of hostilities, the king was convinced to renounce effective command of the army, which he continued to hold formally. Rather than appointing a Piedmontese general, he selected the Polish general Wojciech Chrzanowski as commander of the army. On 8 March, the council of war in Turin decided that the armistice would be broken on the 12th. According to the terms of the armistice, hostilities would then begin eight days later on 20 March.

The war did indeed resume on that day. On 22 March, Charles Albert arrived at Novara and a day later, Radetzy attacked the city from the south with superior numbers, near the village of Bicocca. Chrzanowski made some significant tactical errors and despite the bravery of the Piedmontese and Charles Albert himself, who fought along with his son Ferdinand in the front lines, the Battle of Novara proved a disastrous defeat.

Returning to the Palazzo Bellini in Novara, the king declared, "Bicocca was lost and retaken three or four times, before our troops were forced to yield... the Major General [Chrzanowski] employed all his strength, my sons did everything they could, the Duke of Genoa [Ferdinand] lost two horses from under himself. Now we have withdrawn within the city, on its walls, with the enemy below, with an exhausted army – further resistance is impossible. It is necessary to request an armistice."

Austria's conditions were very harsh: occupation of the Lomellina and the fortress of Alessandria, as well as the surrender of all the Lombards who had fought against Austria. Charles Albert asked the generals if it was possible for a final push to open a path to Alessandria. They said it was not: the army was in pieces, discipline had crumbled, many soldiers fighting in the campaign were despoiling the houses in the countryside and they feared an attack on the king himself.

At 9:30 pm on the same day, Charles Albert summoned his sons, Chrzanowski, generals Alessandro Ferrero La Marmora, Carlo Emanuele La Marmora, Giovanni Durando, Luigi Fecia di Cossato (who had negotiated the armistice) and minister Carlo Cadorna. He confessed that he had no choice but to abdicate. They tried to dissuade him, but, in the hope that Victor Emmanuel could get better terms, he ended the discussion, "My decision is the fruit of mature reflection. From this moment, I am no longer the king; the king is Victor, my son."

== Exile (1849) ==
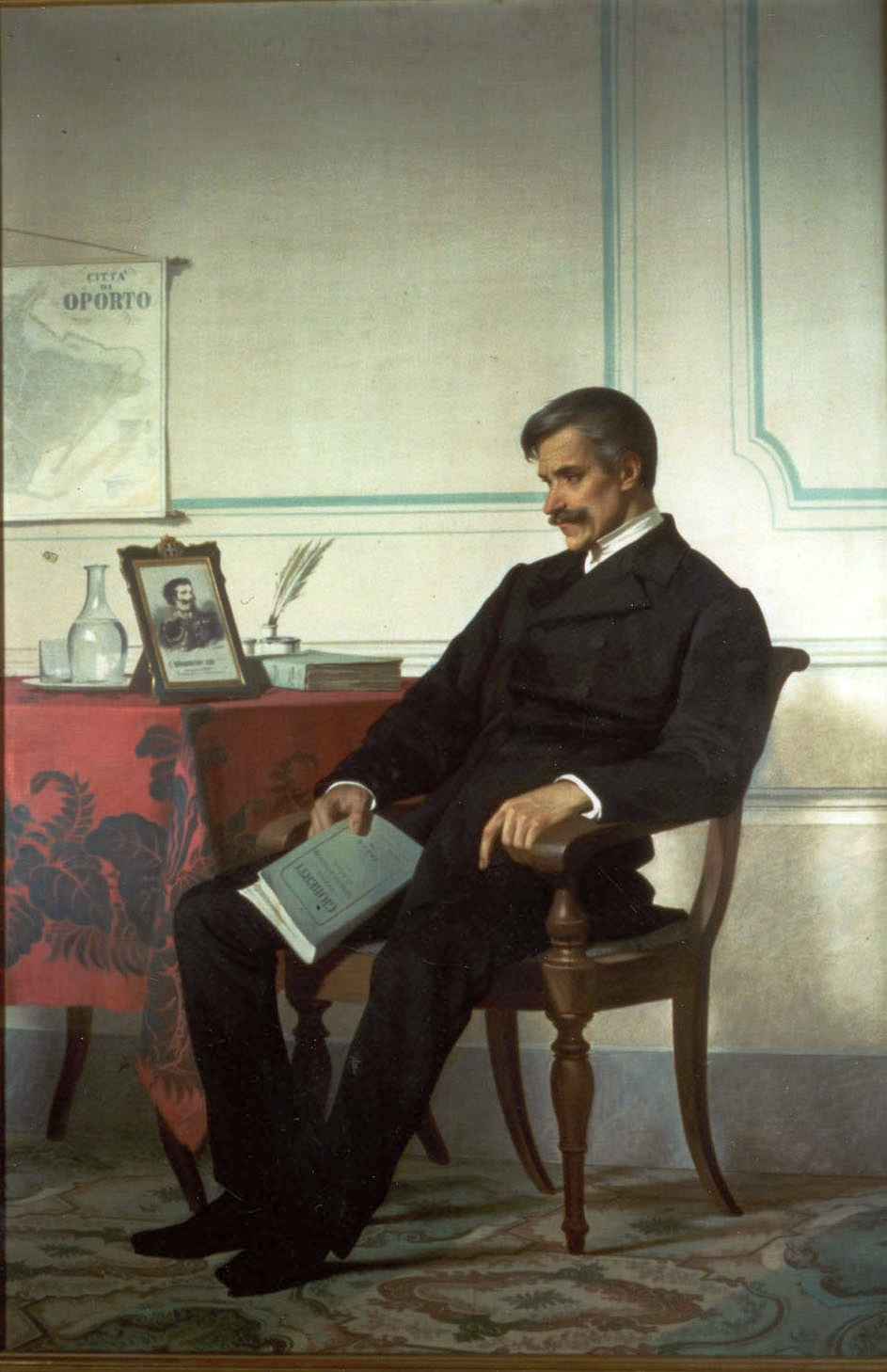
Charles Albert in Porto during the exile. In his hands, he holds a work of Gioberti, whose Neo-Guelf ideas he shared. Painting by Antonio Puccinelli (1822–1897).

Charles Albert's eldest son became king of Sardinia as Victor Emmanuel II and agreed to an armistice with Radetzky on 24 March 1849 at Vignale, effectively obtaining more favourable terms than previously offered. The Austrians were to occupy Lomellina for a while and only half of the fort of Alessandria, with "permission" rather than "by right".

=== Voyage to Portugal ===
Charles Albert, however, had left Palazzo Bellini in Novara a few minutes after midnight on 23 March. His carriage travelled to Orfengo (on the road halfway between Novara and Vercelli), probably without any specific destination in mind, but after a little while he was stopped at an Austrian roadblock. Charles Albert identified himself as the Count of Barge (a title which he actually possessed) and a colonel of the Piedmontese army. General Georg Thurn Valsassina (1788–1866) interrogated him and it is not clear whether he recognized him or not. Having been confirmed as the Count of Barge by a captured sharpshooter (when asked "can you confirm that this is the Count of Barge?" the soldier responded, "He is the Count of Barge."), Charles Albert was allowed to pass and continued his journey to the southwest.

The former king continued via Moncalvo, Nizza Monferrato, Acqui, Savona, Ventimiglia and Monaco, which he reached on 26 March. At Nice, then part of the Kingdom of Sardinia, he dispatched instructions to organize his family affairs, without adding any information for his wife. On 1 April, he was at Bayonne, near the Atlantic coast, and on 3 April he received a message from Turin in order to get him to legally confirm his abdication.

Charles Albert continued through Torquemada, Valladolid, León, and A Coruña, which he reached on 10 April, and which was the end of the carriage road. On horseback, suffering from illness, he reached Lugo on 15 April and entered Portuguese territory at Caminha. From there he went to Viana do Castelo, Póvoa de Varzim and, finally, on 19 April, at noon, he arrived in Porto. From there he may have planned to travel to America, but he was forced to stop because he had become ill with a liver complaint.

=== Final days in Porto ===
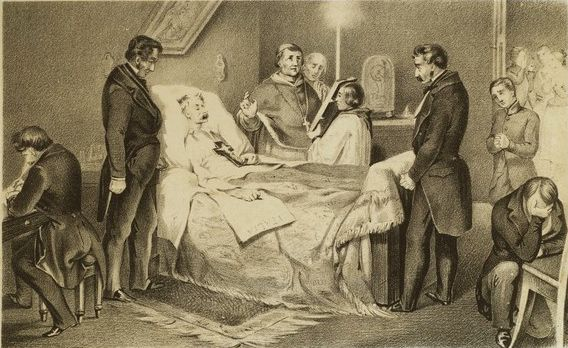
The death of Charles Albert in a contemporary print

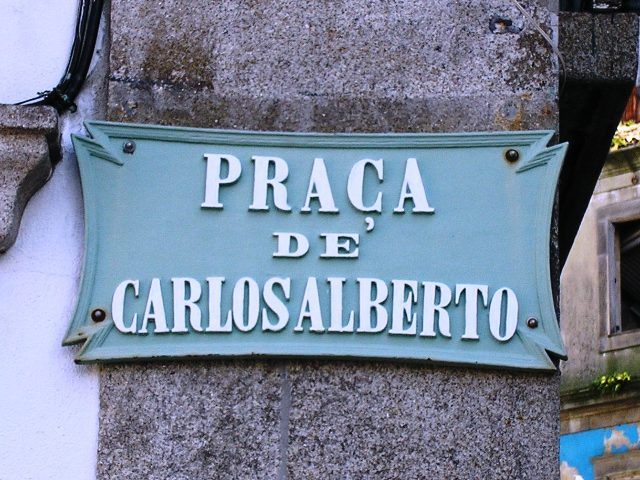
Charles Albert Square, Porto, Portugal

Once his arrival in Porto became known, Charles Albert was hosted at the Hotel do Peixe, where he remained for two weeks, as his condition worsened. Then he accepted a new residence from a private individual on the rua de Entre Quintas, with a view of the ocean. On 3 May, he hosted Giacinto Provana di Collegno and Luigi Cibrario, who brought him greetings from the Piedmontese government. To them, he said:

Despite my abdication, if ever a new war arises against Austria... I will come running immediately, even if only as a simple soldier, among the ranks of her enemies... I am equally raised up by the thought and the hope that... the day will come which I tried to bring about... The nation could have had a better prince than me, but not one that loved her more. To make her free, independent and great... I carried out every sacrifice with a happy heart... I sought death [in battle] and did not find it...

— Charles Albert to Collegno and Cibrario, May 1849, in Bertoldi, p. 269

During this time, Charles Albert suffered from progressive decay, coughing and abscesses. He had two heart attacks, but the doctors considered the condition of his liver the most serious issue, for which the former king abstained from eating very much and fasted on Wednesdays. He read the letters and newspapers which arrived from Italy. He wrote occasionally to his wife, but regularly and with feeling to the Countess of Robilant. He forbade his mother, wife, and children from visiting.

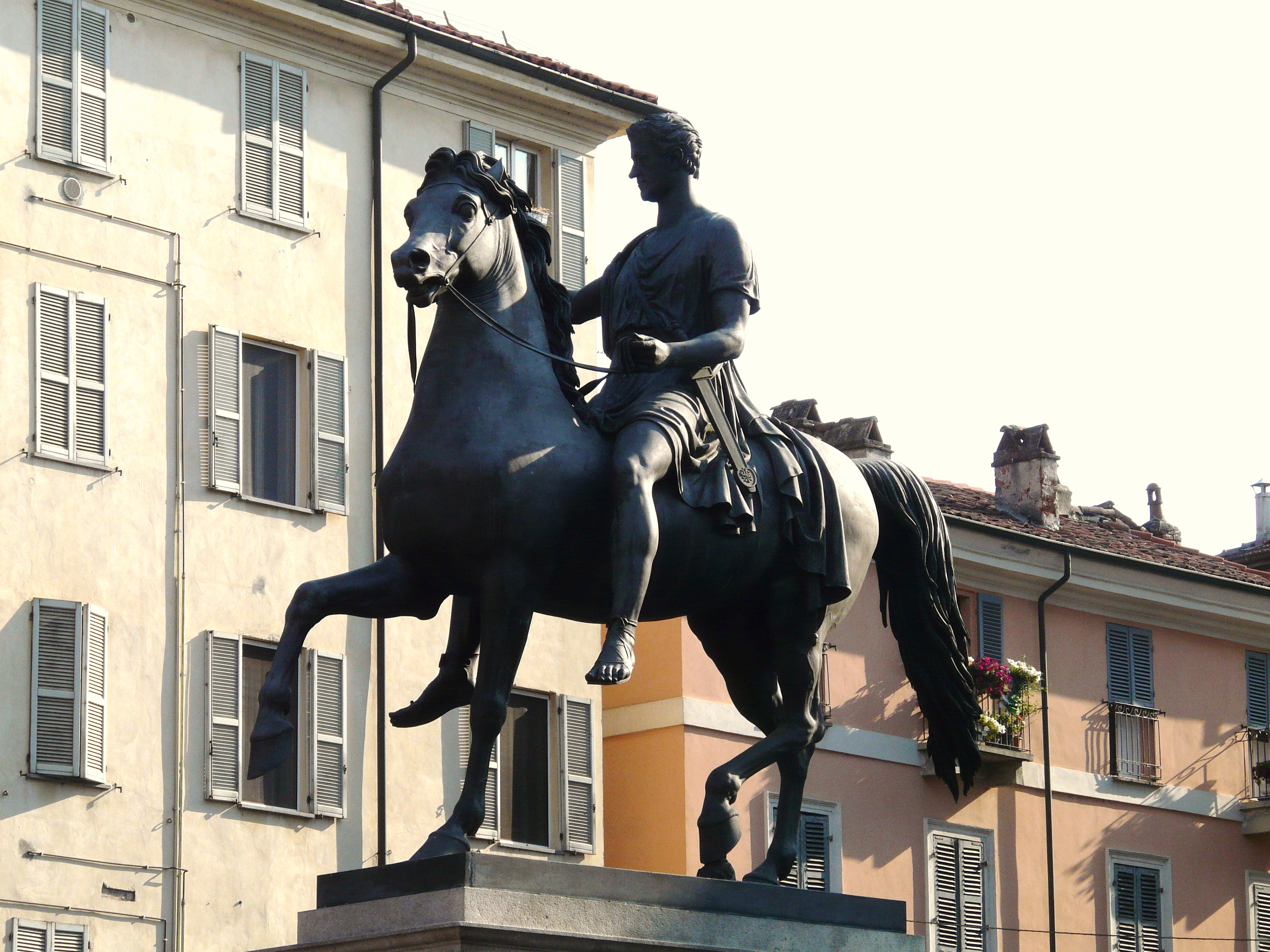
Equestrian statue of Charles Albert at Casale Monferrato

In the month after his arrival, his health had deteriorated irreparably. From 3 July, he was assisted by the doctor Alessandro Riberi, whom Victor Emmanuel had sent from Turin. He was no longer able to get out of bed and coughing fits were ever more frequent. He passed the night of 27 July in great difficulty. On the morning of 28 July, he seemed better, but then deteriorated as a result of a third heart attack. The Portuguese priest don Antonio Peixoto, who had assisted him spiritually, met with him and administered extreme unction. Charles Albert whispered in Latin, In manus tuas, Domine, commendo spiritum meum (Into your hands, O Lord, I commend my spirit). He fell asleep with the crucifix on his chest and died at 3:30 in the afternoon, a little over 51 years old.

His body was embalmed and displayed in the Cathedral of Porto. On 3 September, the ships, Mozambano and Goito arrived under the command of his cousin Eugene Emmanuel. On 19 September the corpse was brought on board the Monzambano, which departed for Genoa that evening. It arrived on 4 October. The funeral took place in Turin Cathedral on 13 October, with Alexis Billiet, Archbishop of Chambéry, presiding along with five Piedmontese bishops, and was well-attended by the people. The day after, the body was solemnly interred in the crypt of the Basilica of Superga, where it still lies.

== Legacy ==
About Charles Albert, Friedrich Engels wrote:

Among the indigenous princes, the number one enemy of Italian freedom was and is Charles Albert. Italians should bear in mind and repeat every hour the old saying: "God watch over my friends, so that I can watch over my enemies". From Ferdinand of the House of Bourbon, there is nothing to fear; he has for a long time been discredited. Charles Albert, on the other hand, calls himself pompously the "liberator of Italy" while on the very people he is supposed to be liberating he imposes as a condition the yoke of his rule.

American historian Alfred Thayer Mahan described Charles Albert thusly:

A strange pathetic being, at odds with himself and his time; compounded of monkish asceticism and soldierly courage; autocratic, but irresolute; holding his honor dearer than his life, yet pursued through life by accusations of dishonor: such was Charles Albert, to whom when he had passed beyond the reach of their praises or their blame, his countrymen gave the epithet 'magnanimous'.

== Family and children ==
In 1817, Charles Albert married his second cousin once removed, Maria Theresa of Tuscany, the youngest daughter of Ferdinand III, Grand Duke of Tuscany, and Princess Luisa of Naples and Sicily. The couple had the following children:

1. Victor Emmanuel II (1820–1878); married Adelaide of Austria.
2. Prince Ferdinand of Savoy (1822–1855), Duke of Genoa; married Princess Elisabeth of Saxony.
3. Princess Maria Cristina of Savoy (2 July 1826 – 15 July 1827) died in infancy.

== Orders and decorations ==
- Kingdom of Sardinia:
  - Knight of the Supreme Order of the Most Holy Annunciation, 1 November 1816
  - Founder of the Civil Order of Savoy, 29 October 1831
- Austrian Empire:
  - Knight of the Military Order of Maria Theresa, 1823
  - Grand Cross of the Royal Hungarian Order of St. Stephen, 1825
- Spain: Knight of the Order of the Golden Fleece, 13 October 1823
- Kingdom of France: Knight of the Order of the Holy Spirit, 5 February 1824
- Russian Empire:
  - Knight of the Order of St. George, 4th Class, February 1824
  - Knight of the Order of St. Andrew the Apostle the First-called, 1831
  - Knight of the Order of St. Alexander Nevsky
- Two Sicilies:
  - Grand Cross of the Order of St. Ferdinand and Merit
  - Knight of the Order of Saint Januarius, 1829
- Grand Duchy of Tuscany: Grand Cross of the Order of St. Joseph
- Kingdom of Prussia: Knight of the Order of the Black Eagle, 22 December 1832
- Belgium: Grand Cordon of the Order of Leopold, 2 September 1840

== See also ==
- Equestrian statue of Charles Albert of Sardinia
- Second Italian War of Independence
- Unification of Italy

== Bibliography ==
- Bertoldi, Silvio (2000). Il re che tentò di fare l'Italia. Vita di Carlo Alberto di Savoia. Milano: Rizzoli. ISBN 88-17-86481-1.
- Comandini, Alfredo (1900). L'Italia nei cento anni del secolo XIX (1801–1825). L'Italia nei cento anni del secolo XIX (1801–1900) giorno per giorno illustrata. Milano: Antonio Vallardi.
- Comandini, Alfredo (1900). L'Italia nei cento anni del secolo XIX (1826–1849). L'Italia nei cento anni del secolo XIX (1801–1900) giorno per giorno illustrata. Milano: Antonio Vallardi.
- Salata, Francesco (1931). Carlo Alberto inedito. Milano: Mondadori.

Charles Albert of Sardinia House of Savoy Born: 2 October 1798 Died: 28 July 1849
Italian nobility
Preceded by Charles Emmanuel	Prince of Carignano; 1800–1831	Succeeded by Position abolished
Regnal titles
Preceded by Charles Felix	King of Sardinia; 1831–1849	Succeeded by Victor Emmanuel II
