= Clemente Solaro, Count La Margherita =

Piedmontese statesman (1792–1869)

Clemente Solaro, Count La Margherita Knight Grand Cross, Order of Isabella the Catholic
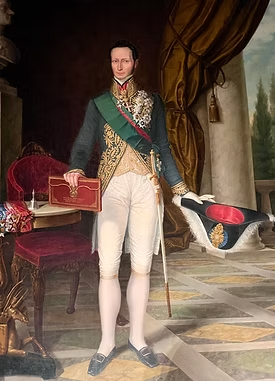
- Clemente Solaro, Count della Margherita

Member of the Chamber of Deputies
- In office 19 December 1853 – 25 October 1857
- Monarch: Victor Emmanuel II

Member of the Chamber of Deputies
- In office 14 December 1857 – 21 January 1860
- Monarch: Victor Emmanuel II

Personal details
- Born: 21 November 1792 Turin, Kingdom of Sardinia
- Died: 12 November 1869 (aged 76) Turin, Kingdom of Italy
- Party: Legitimism
- Education: University of Turin

Clemente Solaro, Count della Margherita (21 November 1792 in Mondovì, Italy – 12 November 1869 in Turin) was a Piedmontese statesman.

== Biography ==
Clemente Solaro studied law at Siena and Turin, but Piedmont was at that time under French domination, and being devoted to the house of Savoy he refused to take his degree, as this proceeding would have obliged him to recognize the authority of the usurper; after the restoration of the Kingdom of Sardinia, however, he graduated.

In 1816 he entered the diplomatic service. Later he returned to Turin, and succeeded in gaining the confidence and esteem of King Charles Albert, who in 1835 appointed him minister of foreign affairs. A fervent Roman Catholic, devoted to the pope and to the Jesuits, friendly to Austria and firmly attached to the principles of autocracy, he strongly opposed every attempt at political innovation, and was in consequence bitterly hated by the liberals. When the popular agitation in favor of constitutional reform first broke out the king felt obliged to dispense with La Margherita's services, although he had conducted public affairs with considerable ability and absolute loyalty, even upholding the dignity of the kingdom in the face of the arrogant attitude of the cabinet of Vienna.

He expounded his political creed and his policy as minister to Charles Albert (from February 1835 to October 1847) in his Memorandum storico-politico, published in 1851, a document of great interest for the study of the conditions of Piedmont and Italy at that time. In 1853 he was elected deputy for San Quirico, but he persisted in regarding his mandate as derived from the royal authority rather than as an emanation of the popular will. As leader of the Clerical Right in the parliament he strongly opposed Cavour's policy, which was eventually to lead to Italian unity, and on the establishment of the Kingdom of Italy he retired from public life.

== Works ==
- L'uomo di stato indirizzato al governo della cosa pubblica (Turin, 1863–64).
- Memorandum storico-politico (Turin, 1851).
- Appendice al Memorandum storico-politico (Turin, 1852).
- Journal historique du siège de la ville et de la citadelle de Turin en 1706 (Turin, 1838).
- Traités de la Maison de Savoie... depuis la paix de Cateau-Cumbrésis jusqu'à nos jours (Turin, 1836-1861, 8 vols.).

== Bibliography ==
- Monaco, Michele (1955). Clemente Solaro della Margarita. Pensiero ed azione di un cattolico di fronte al Risorgimento italiano (in Italian). Turin: Marietti.
- Levra, Umberto (2019). "SOLARO, Clemente, conte della Margarita". Dizionario Biografico degli Italiani (in Italian). Vol. 93: Sisto V–Stammati. Rome: Istituto dell'Enciclopedia Italiana. ISBN 978-88-12-00032-6.
