= Giacinto Collegno =

Italian patriot (1793–1856)

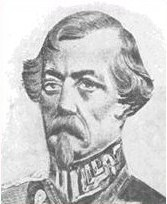
Giacinto Provana di Collegno

Giacinto Provana di Collegno (Turin, 1793 – Baveno, 1856) was an Italian patriot of the Risorgimento period, a friend of Giuseppe Garibaldi. Trained as a geologist, he became a Piedmontese politician and in July 1848 he was appointed Minister of War in the Casati government.

Collegno fought during the Napoleonic Wars, reaching the rank of colonel in an engineering unit. Following his exile from Italy he joined his friend count Annibale Santorre di Rossi de Pomarolo, Count of Santarosa to Greece where they fought in the Greek War of Independence. On 31 March 1825, he was appointed head engineer of the Neokastro garrison which at the time was undergoing a siege by Egyptian troops.
