= Policarpo Cacherano d'Osasco =

Italian general

Policarpo Cacherano d'Osasco (1744 in Cantarana – 27 August 1824, in Turin) was an officer during the Napoleonic Wars, who rose to the rank of general.

== Bibliography ==
- Massabò, I. Ricci (1973), "Cacherano d'Osasco, Policarpo Vitaliano", Dizionario Biografico degli Italiani, vol. 16, Rome: Istituto della Enciclopedia italiana
