= Alessandro Di Saluzzo di Monesiglio =

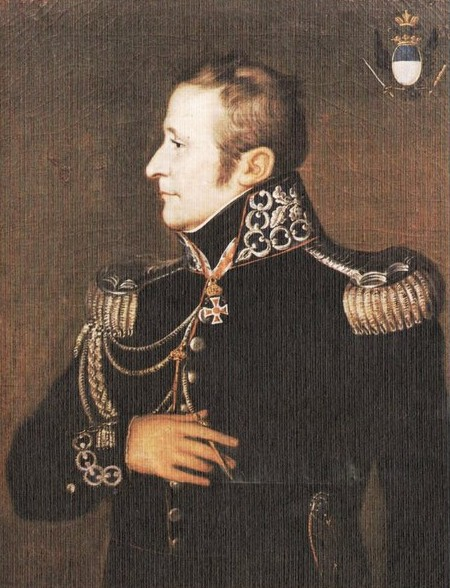

Senator of the Kingdom of Sardinia
- In office 3 April 1848 – 10 August 1851

Personal details
- Born: 12 October 1775; Turin
- Died: August 10, 1851 (aged 75); Turin
- Citizenship: Kingdom of Sardinia
- Occupation: Lieutenant-General of the Sardinian Army
- Website: Dati biografici dal sito del Senato.

Alessandro Di Saluzzo di Monesiglio (12 October 1775 – 10 August 1851) was a Royal Sardinian Army officer and politician.

== Biography ==
Alessandro Di Saluzzo di Monesiglio was born at Turin in 1775. He was the son of Giuseppe Angelo Saluzzo di Monesiglio, Count of Monesiglio and the noblewoman, Maria Margherita Giuseppa Girolama Cassoti di Casalgrasso.

When he was very young he enrolled in the Royal Sardinian Army and he was employed in senior roles from the restoration in 1814, when he was part of the Regency Council, as a colonel. In the meantime, he married the noblewoman Maria Luisa Arborio Di Breme.

On 23 March 1819, he was assigned the role of commandant-general of the Arma dei Carabinieri, a role which he retained until he was promoted to major general and appointed First Secretary of State for War on 27 November 1820. Subsequently, he was envoy extraordinary and minister plenipotentiary to Russia (16 January 1822 - 22 June 1825). On 15 September 1831, he became a president of section of the Council of State and a minister of state.

On 3 April 1848 he was elected as a senator of the Subalpine Senate.

In the cultural sphere, Di Saluzzo became a resident fellow of the Accademia delle Scienze di Torino on 21 March 1822 and was subsequently its president from 18 November 1838 until his death. On account of his passion for history, he became vice-president of the Deputazione Subalpina di storia patria of Turin.

He died in Turin on 10 August 1851.

Preceded by Giovanni Battista D'Oncieu de La Bàtie	Commandant-General of the Arma dei Carabinieri; 23 March 1819 - 27 November 1820	Succeeded by Giovanni Maria Cavasanti
