= Giuseppe Dabormida =

Italian politician and general

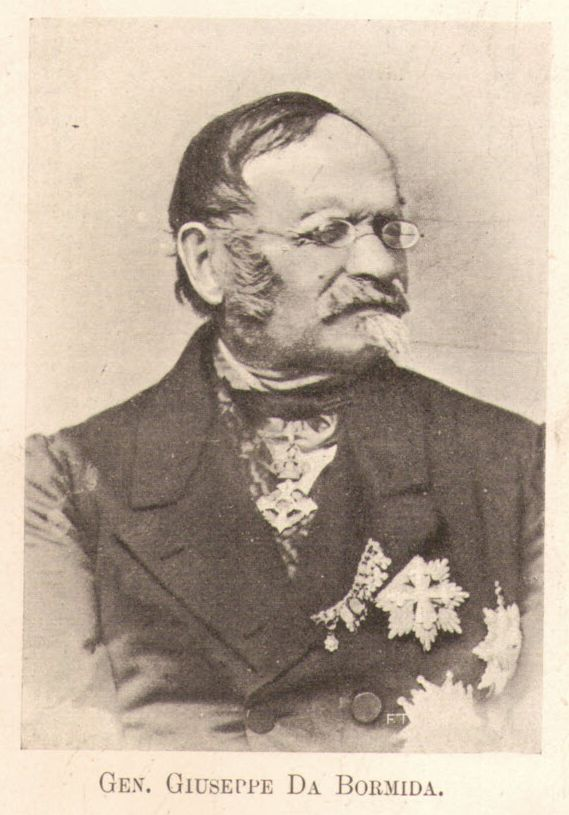

Foreign Minister of the Kingdom of Sardinia
- In office 4 November 1852 – 10 January 1855
- Preceded by: Massimo d'Azeglio
- Succeeded by: Camillo Benso, Count of Cavour
- In office 19 July 1859 – 21 January 1860
- Preceded by: Camillo Benso, Count of Cavour
- Succeeded by: Camillo Benso, Count of Cavour

Minister of War of the Kingdom of Sardinia
- In office 15 August 1848 – 11 October 1848
- Preceded by: Giacinto Collegno
- In office 11 October 1848 – 27 October 1848
- Succeeded by: Alfonso La Marmora
- In office 27 March 1849 – 29 March 1849
- Succeeded by: Enrico Morozzo Della Rocca

Senator of the Kingdom of Sardinia and Senator of the Kingdom of Italy
- In office 19 November 1852 – 10 August 1869

Member of the Chamber of Deputies of the Kingdom of Sardinia
- In office 8 May 1848 – 4 November 1852

Giuseppe Secondo Dabormida (or Da Bormida) (Verrua Savoia, 21 November 1799 – Buriasco, 10 August 1869) was an Italian general and politician. He was Minister of War of the Kingdom of Sardinia (22 August 1848 – 27 October 1848) during the First Italian War of Independence, then Foreign Minister twice (4 November 1852 – 10 January 1855), (19 July 1859 – 21 January 1860). Made a count in 1863, he was the tutor of Vittorio Emanuele II and a renowned artillery expert.

== Origins and youth ==
He was born in 1799 in Verrua, today Verrua Savoia, in the Kingdom of Sardinia to Giovanni Battista Dabormida, a magistrate, and his wife Vittoria Seghini. He studied at the Napoleonic Imperial High School in Genoa and embarked on a military career. On March 29, 1815, he entered the artillery as a cadet. Two years later he became second lieutenant, and was made lieutenant on 14 September 1819.

Following the uprisings of 1820-1821 he was sent with his regiment to Novara and after the failure of the insurrection, perhaps due to his friendship with the patriot Giacinto Collegno, he was transferred to Sardinia. In his return to Piedmont, he was assigned to Alessandria and promoted to captain on 30 January 1824; on 23 July 1828 he became professor of artillery institutions at the Royal Academy of Turin and on 23 February 1833 was promoted to major. During this period he became friends with Vincenzo Gioberti.

== At the court of Savoy ==
On 19 October 1836, his first wife Giulia Taurini Tornielli having died, he remarried Angelica de Negry della Niella. From this second marriage his son Vittorio Dabormida was born, as was a daughter, Vittoria.

In 1838 the king commissioned him to teach artillery and military art to his two sons, Vittorio Emanuele and Ferdinando. In recognition of the commitment with which he had carried out the task of tutor, on 21 November 1840, he was awarded the Knight's Cross of the Saints Maurice and Lazarus. In 1841 Dabormida was sent to Germany to undertake military studies and two years later he attained the rank of colonel.

== The campaign of 1848 ==
On 8 January 1848 Dabormida was appointed member of the Permanent Congress of Artillery and on 18 March, on the eve of the First Italian War of Independence, he became first officer (i.e. general secretary) of the new Minister of War it:Antonio Franzini. The latter having left as the king's aide-de-camp, Dabormida had to take on the organization of the departments and deal with problems relating to supplies. On 20 June 1848 he was promoted to general and on the 26th, in the by-elections, he was elected for the first time as deputy for the constituency of Avigliana.

== Minister of War ==
After the armistice with Austria was signed, a new executive was formed under Cesare Alfieri di Sostegno. Franzini was appointed Minister of War but resigned after a few days. The role of Minister of War was therefore entrusted to Dabormida on 22 August 1848, with the task of reorganizing the army and placing it in a position to resume hostilities. After the armistice he had insisted on placing a French general at the head of the Piedmontese troops, and suggesting Thomas Robert Bugeaud, Nicolas Changarnier and Marie-Alphonse Bedeau. When he became minister, he sent Colonel Alfonso La Marmora to Paris for difficult negotiations for this purpose, although Charles Albert proved more favorable to the idea of giving command to the Polish general Wojciech Chrzanowski.

At the same time, Dabormida found himself managing the controversies that followed the failure of the first military campaign in 1848, for which several generals were blamed. Among them was Eugenio Bava, who had been commander of the army with Charles Albert and who, defying criticism, on 25 August 1848 asked Dabormida to open an investigation into him. The minister managed to deter him, believing that any such investigation would end up involving the entire army in its scope, at a time when the resumption of war seemed imminent.

Despite the serious defeat suffered in the first military campaign, Charles Albert insisted on retaining personal command of the army. On 13 September 1848 he decided to return from Alessandria to the capital Turin and arranged for all the men of the command to follow him. But Dabormida, in agreement with the rest of the government, explicitly ordered the generals to remain in place. The command therefore remained in Alessandria, effectively in the hands of Bava and Franzini, who in the meantime had been appointed chief of staff. Consequently, on 22 October Dabormida presented to Charles Albert the decree appointing Bava as general in chief of the Royal Army, but still with General Chrzanowski, who had arrived in Turin due to the king's interest, as head of the general staff.

== Resignation ==
When Sostegno resigned as Prime Minister in October the king replaced him with Ettore Perrone di San Martino and Dabormida continued to serve as War Minister. In the autumn of 1848 the Chamber of Deputies began to discuss the state of readiness of the Sardinian army, and there was a growing demand to return to war with Austria. In his speeches in the chamber, Dabormida urged against hurrying back to hostilities. In a heated debate on the question on 21 October he was able to carry the house, which voted 77 to 58 against a motion calling for the immediate resumption of hostilities. Nevertheless Dabormida, exhausted, offended by some of the behavior of the Chamber and now at odds with Charles Albert, decided to resign, proposing Alfonso La Marmora as his successor, who followed him in office on 27 October 1848.

Having removed critical voices, including Dabormida, Charles Albert resumed hostilities against Austria on 20 March 1849 but only three days later, the defeat of Novara marked the end of the second military campaign and the first war of independence. He then abdicated in favour of his son Vittorio Emanuele II. Dabormida was again offered the position of Minister of War, which he refused. He instead accepted the mandate of plenipotentiary (with di Pralormo and Bon Compagni) in the negotiations with Austria, which concluded with the Peace of Milan on 6 August 1849.

== Foreign minister (1852-1855) ==
In December 1849, in the elections for the IV legislature of the Kingdom of Sardinia, Dabormida was re-elected to the constituency of Avigliana, which had already elected him to the I, II and III legislatures. He continued his activity as a deputy in the group of the so-called historical Right of the Cavour. In 1852, Vittorio Emanuele II asked Cavour to form his first government. In the choice of ministers he made his preferences known, including Dabormida, who assumed the role of Foreign Minister and who three days before taking office was appointed senator, on 1 November.

Following Sardinia’s defeat by Austria in 1848-9, one of the main tasks of her Foreign Minister was to cultivate good relations with France to help ensure her security. As well as doing this Dabormida had to manage difficult relations with Austria that often threatened to take the two countries back to war. Marshal Radetzky restored Austrian rule over the Kingdom of Lombardy–Venetia with great harshness. There were more than 900 executions of Italian nationalists in 1848-49; in 1852 the episode of the Belfiore martyrs aroused strong feelings and in 1853 the Milan Uprising prompted anti-Austrian stories in the Sardinian press. Dabormida tried to limit the damage by offering to circulate official statements condemning the anti-Austrian insults in the press to neighboring states or to express similar views in a formal diplomatic note.

== The Crimean War ==
Within months however the government’s attention shifted to the Russian occupation of the Danubian Principalities, which was to lead to the Crimean War. This situation presented new challenges for Sardinia: the Austrians refused to join Britain and France in opposing Russia unless they were given guarantees of security in Italy - Radetzky went so far as to demand that Austria be permitted to occupy Alessandria as a guarantee of Sardinia keeping the peace while she was engaged with Russia.

Some politicians in Turin meanwhile calculated that they could isolate Austria and secure British and French support for Italian nationalism by offering Sardinian support against Russia. Dabormida however was set on a policy of neutrality. Both Vittorio Emanuele II and Cavour were however eager to intervene in the conflict alongside the two Western powers, above all to prevent Austria from doing so, which would have completely isolated Sardinia. On 22 December 1854 Austria signed an agreement with France for mutual territorial guarantees in Italy. This initiative, together with a formal request for help from Britain and France, pushed the government to abandon the Dabormida’s policy of caution.

A cabinet meeting on 13 December 1854 decided that Sardinia should offer to join Britain and France in return for the granting of a loan, admission to the peace negotiations, a guarantee that Austria would not attack while her troops were in the Crimea, and a commitment on the part of the allies to obtain from Vienna the revocation of the seizures of Lombard refugees' assets.

France and Britain, however, rejected these conditions. Right wing politicians led by Count Revel urged Vittorio Emanuele on 1 January 1855 to form a new government that would take the country into the war in any case, with no preconditions. For his part, Dabormida, when he met the ambassadors of France and Great Britain on 7 January 1855, declared that without the guarantees previously agreed by the cabinet, Sardinia would not enter the war. He was contradicted the same day by Vittorio Emanuele, who reassured the French ambassador that "if those [in the government] don't want to march I will take others who will march".

On 9 January Dabormida had a difficult meeting with Cavour, other members of the government and the two ambassadors. After 4 hours of discussion, at midnight, Cavour postponed the session to the next day. During the night Dabormida, determined not to give in on the guarantees from the allies, but now in the minority, resigned. The following day Cavour was also appointed Foreign Minister by Vittorio Emanuele, thus opening the path to the Crimean War for the Kingdom of Sardinia.

== Foreign minister (1859-1860) ==
The disagreement with Cavour did not harm Dabormida's career: on 31 March 1855 he was appointed general of artillery and, after the victory of the allies in the Crimean War, in April 1856 he was sent as plenipotentiary minister to St. Petersburg with Tsar Alexander II, for the re-establishment of diplomatic relations between the two countries.

Once the second war of independence ended and Cavour resigned due to disagreements with the king regarding the armistice of Villafranca, Vittorio Emanuele II entrusted the presidency of the council on 19 July 1859 to La Marmora and the foreign ministry to Dabormida. He inherited a difficult situation, since the terms of the armistice with Austria provided for the restoration of the old rulers in Tuscany and Modena, replaced during the war by provisional governments who in August decided on the annexation to the Kingdom of Sardinia.

To explore the possibility of an annexation of these two territories, Dabormida went to Paris, where he negotiated directly with Napoleon III, who rejected the possibility of annexation. The emperor, however, said he was willing to renounce compensation for war expenses if Sardinia ceded Savoy to France. Although he was out of the government, Cavour spoke out in favour of annexing Tuscany and Modena for annexations, and on 16 January 1860 Vittorio Emanuele II invited him to form a cabinet, causing the La Marmora government to fall.

== Later years ==
On 22 April 1860 Dabormida was appointed member of the examination commission at the Royal Academy of Turin; from 24 June of that year to 26 October 1866 he was president of the artillery committee; from 8 July 1862 to 10 January 1866 he was president of the Superior Council of Military Institutes and on 22 February 1863 he was awarded the title of count. On 22 May 1866 he received the honor of grand officer of the Crown of Italy. Forced to retire on 26 October of the same year due to a stroke, he died in Buriasco on 19 August 1869.

== Honours ==
Giuseppe Dabormida was decorated with many honours, both civilian and military, by Sardinia, Italy and other states.

=== Italian honours ===
Grande ufficiale dell'Ordine militare di Savoia - ribbon for ordinary uniform

Grand Officer of the Military Order of Savoy

Gran cordone dell'Ordine dei SS. Maurizio e Lazzaro - ribbon for ordinary uniform

Grand cordon of the Order of Saints Maurice and Lazarus
— 26 March 1853

Grande ufficiale dell'Ordine della Corona d'Italia - ribbon for ordinary uniform

Grand Officer of the Order of the Crown of Italy
— 22 April 1868

=== Foreign honours ===
Gran Croce dell'Ordine della Legion d'onore (Francia) - ribbon for ordinary uniform

Grand Cross of the Legion of Honour (France)
— 14 December 1860

Gran cordone dell'Ordine di Leopoldo (Belgio) - ribbon for ordinary uniform

Grand cordon of the Order of Leopold (Belgium)
— 12 January 1860

Gran croce dell'Ordine di S. Benedetto d'Avis di Portogallo - ribbon for ordinary uniform

Grand Cross of the Military Order of Aviz (Portugal)
— 17 February 1856

Gran cordone dell'Aquila Rossa (Prussia) - ribbon for ordinary uniform

Grand cordon of the Order of the Red Eagle (Prussia)
— 28 January 1860

Cavaliere dell'Ordine S. Stanislao (Russia) - ribbon for ordinary uniform

Knight of the Order of Saint Stanislaus (Russia)
— 6 March 1833

Cavaliere di prima classe dell'Ordine di S. Anna (Russia) - ribbon for ordinary uniform

Knight First Class of the Order of Saint Anna (Russia)
— 27 May 1856

Cavaliere dell'Ordine di Sant'Andrea (Russia) - ribbon for ordinary uniform

Knight of the Order of St. Andrew (Russia)
— 1859

Cavaliere di prima classe dell'Ordine del Mejidiyye (Impero ottomano) - ribbon for ordinary uniform

Knight First Class of the Order of the Medjidie (Ottoman Empire)
— 5 July 1855
