= Alfonso Ferrero La Marmora =

Italian general and politician (1804–1878)

Alfonso La Màrmora
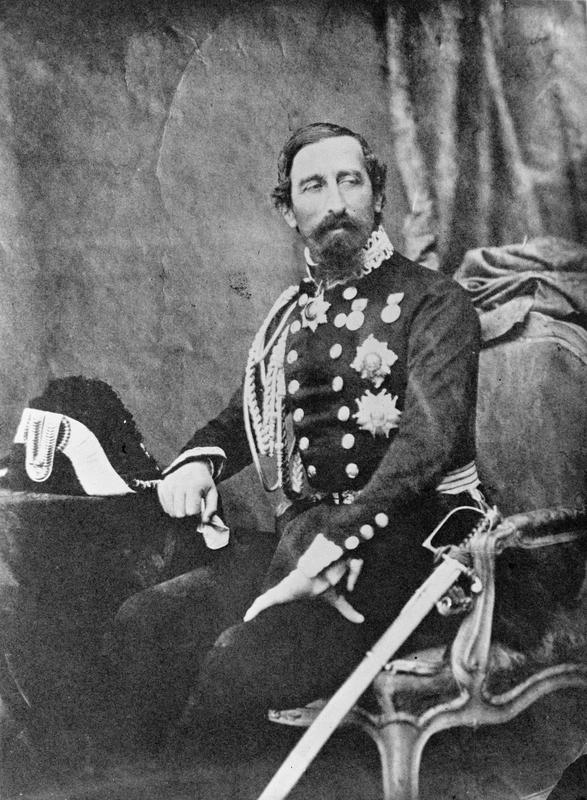

Prime Minister of Italy
- In office 28 September 1864 – 20 June 1866
- Monarch: Victor Emmanuel II
- Preceded by: Marco Minghetti
- Succeeded by: Bettino Ricasoli

Prime Minister of Sardinia
- In office 19 July 1859 – 21 January 1860
- Monarch: Victor Emmanuel II
- Preceded by: Count of Cavour
- Succeeded by: Count of Cavour

Minister of War of Sardinia
- In office 28 October – 16 December 1848
- Monarch: Charles Albert
- Prime Minister: Ettore Perrone di San Martino
- Preceded by: Giuseppe Dabormida
- Succeeded by: Ettore de Sonnaz
- In office 2 February – 9 February 1849
- Monarch: Charles Albert
- Prime Minister: Vincenzo Gioberti
- Preceded by: Ettore De Sonnaz
- Succeeded by: Agostino Chiodo
- In office 3 November 1849 – 2 April 1855
- Monarch: Victor Emmanuel I
- Prime Minister: Massimo d'Azeglio; Camillo Benso
- Preceded by: Eusebio Bava
- Succeeded by: Giacomo Durando
- In office 16 January 1856 – 15 January 1858
- Monarch: Victor Emmanuel I
- Prime Minister: Camillo Benso
- Preceded by: Giacomo Durando
- Succeeded by: Giacomo Durando
- In office 19 July 1859 – 21 January 1860
- Monarch: Victor Emmanuel I
- Prime Minister: Himself
- Preceded by: Giacomo Durando
- Succeeded by: Manfredo Fanti

Minister of Foreign Affairs of Sardinia
- In office 12 July – 15 September 1851
- Monarch: Victor Emmanuel I
- Prime Minister: Massimo d'Azeglio
- Preceded by: Massimo d'Azeglio
- Succeeded by: Massimo d'Azeglio

Minister of the Navy of Italy
- In office 28 September – 21 December 1864
- Monarch: Victor Emmanuel I
- Prime Minister: Himself
- Preceded by: Efisio Cugia
- Succeeded by: Diego Angioletti

Personal details
- Born: 18 November 1804 Turin, French Empire
- Died: 5 January 1878 (aged 73) Florence, Kingdom of Italy
- Party: Independent

Military service
- Allegiance: Kingdom of Sardinia; Kingdom of Italy
- Branch/service: Royal Italian Army
- Years of service: 1823–1866
- Battles/wars: First Italian War of Independence; Crimean War; Siege of Sevastopol; Battle of the Chernaya; Second Italian War of Independence; Brigantaggio; Third Italian War of Independence; Battle of Custoza

Alfonso Ferrero La Marmora (Italian pronunciation: [alˈfɔnso la ˈmarmora]; 18 November 1804 – 5 January 1878) was an Italian general and statesman. His older brothers include a soldier and a naturalist Alberto della Marmora and Alessandro Ferrero La Marmora, founder of the branch of the Italian army now called the Bersaglieri.

== Biography ==
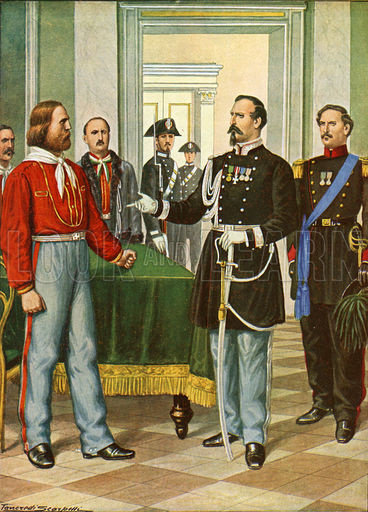
Garibaldi and General La Marmora

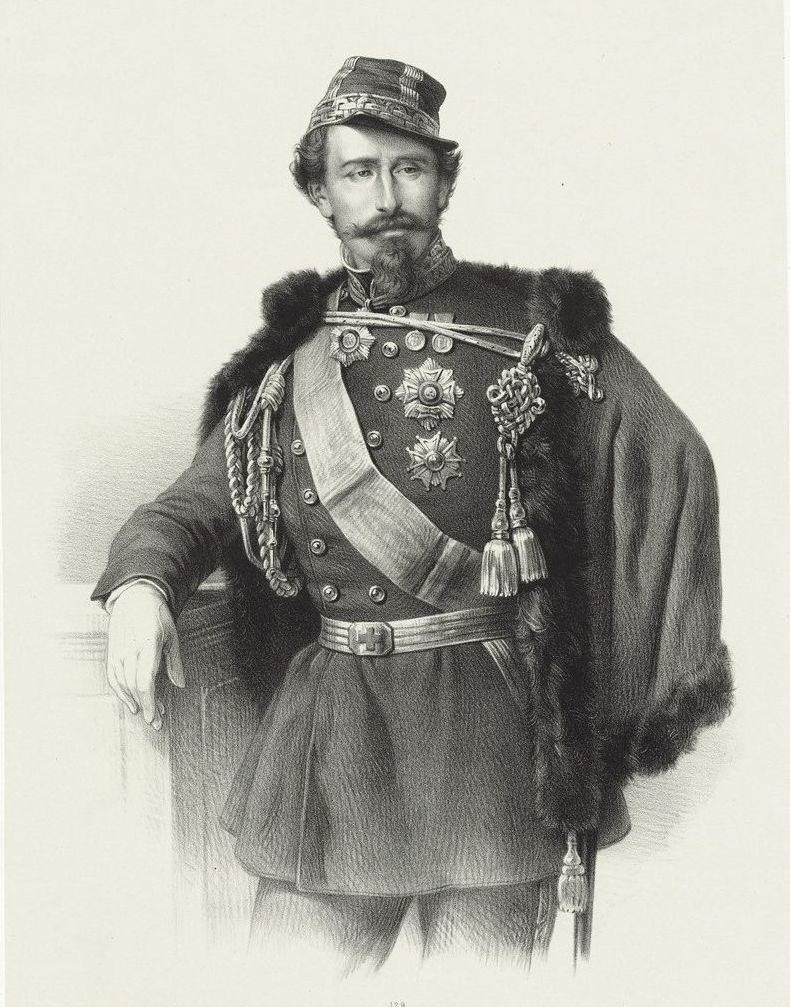
Portrait of La Marmora

Born in Turin, he entered the Sardinian army in 1823, and was a captain in March 1848, when he gained distinction and the rank of major at the siege of Peschiera. On 5 August 1848, he liberated Charles Albert of Sardinia from a revolutionary mob in Milan, and in October was promoted general and appointed Minister of War. After suppressing the revolt of Genoa in 1849, he again assumed in November 1849 the portfolio of war, which, save during the period of his command of the Crimean expedition (where he commanded at the siege of Sevastopol and the battle of the Chernaya), he retained until 1859.

He took part in the war of 1859 against Austria; and in July of that year succeeded Cavour in the premiership. In 1860 he was sent to Berlin and Saint Petersburg to arrange for the recognition of the kingdom of Italy and subsequently he held the offices of governor of Milan and royal lieutenant at Naples, until, in September 1864, he succeeded Marco Minghetti as premier. In this capacity, he modified the scope of the September Convention by a note in which he claimed for Italy full freedom of action in respect of national aspirations to the possession of Rome, a document of which Visconti-Venosta afterwards took advantage when justifying the Italian occupation of Rome in 1870.

In April 1866, La Marmora concluded a military alliance with Prussia against Austria-Hungary, and, on the outbreak of the Third Italian War of Independence in June, took command of an army corps. He is largely credited of the hesitant conduct of the first phases of the Italian invasion, which, despite the large Italian superiority, led to the defeat in the battle of Custoza on 23 June. Accused of treason by his fellow countrymen, in particular by other high-rank generals, and of duplicity by the Prussians, he eventually published in defence of his tactics (1873) a series of documents entitled Un po' più di luce sugli eventi dell'anno 1866 ("More light on the events of 1866"), a step which caused irritation in Germany, and exposed him to the charge of having violated state secrets.

Meanwhile, he was sent to Paris in 1867 to oppose the French expedition to Rome, and in 1870, after the occupation of Rome by the Italians, was appointed lieutenant-royal of the new capital. He died in Florence on 5 January 1878. La Marmora's writings include Un episodio di risorgimento italiano (1875) and Il segreto di stato nel governo costituzionale (1877).

Political offices
Preceded by Marco Minghetti	Prime Minister of Italy; 1864–1866	Succeeded by Bettino Ricasoli
Preceded by Emilio Visconti-Venosta	Italian Minister of Foreign Affairs; 1864–1866	Succeeded by Emilio Visconti-Venosta
Preceded by Efisio Cugia	Italian Minister of the Navy; 1864–1864	Succeeded by Diego Angioletti
