= Neo-Guelphism =

Neo-Guelphs Neoguelfi
- Leader: Vincenzo Gioberti
- Founded: 1843
- Dissolved: 1852
- Ideology: Confederalism; Theocratic monarchism Christian liberalism
- Political position: Centre
- Religion: Roman Catholicism
- National affiliation: Moderates

Neo-Guelphism (Italian: Neoguelfismo) was a 19th-century Italian political movement, started by Vincenzo Gioberti, which wanted to unite Italy into a single kingdom with the Pope as its king. Despite little popular support, the movement raised interests among intellectuals, journalists and Catholic reformist politicians. They were also linked both to ontologism, a philosophical movement, and to rationalist-leaning theology.

== Philosophy and platform ==
As modern political parties were not present in Italy in the 19th century, the neo-Guelphs were only circles of intellectuals, aristocrats, journalists and businessmen with Catholic and unitarian tendencies. The movement was not too nationalist, preferring a confederation between the several Italian states led by the Pope. On social issues, the neo-Guelphs tended to support both reformist and law and order policies.

Many neo-Guelphists thought that Giovanni Mastai-Ferretti (elected pope Pius IX in 1846) would boost their cause, but he rejected their movement. This rejection was disheartening to Catholic liberals everywhere, and the anti-clerical left saw it as proof that the papacy was inherently reactionary—ready to sacrifice its very autonomy and an Italian state simply to protect narrow temporal interests, such as noble interests in the papal states. Popes generally came from this nobility, to say nothing of the curia and Vatican hierarchy in general.

In Piedmont-Sardinia, the movement gained enough influences to install two neo-Guelphs in government: Cesare Balbo, from March to July 1848, and Gioberti himself, from December 1848 to February 1849. However, the final defeat in the First War of Independence by Austria caused the decline of neo-Guelphism, seen as too moderate and "papist", in favor of parliamentary right-wing group, that purposed a mix of war and diplomacy to unify Italy under the House of Savoy.

After the Franco-Austrian War of 1859, which granted to Piedmont-Sardinia the control over Northern Italy (except for Veneto), neo-Guelphism was considered obsolete and unobtainable. In 1860, republican Giuseppe Garibaldi led his expedition in Southern Italy, which eventually led to Italian unification under Piedmont-Sardinia, however, leaving the Papacy as its own individual state. This eased the fears from Roman Catholic countries such as France who believed that a unified Italy could "corrupt" the Papacy.

=== Supporters ===
- Sardinian Prime Minister Vincenzo Gioberti
- Sardinian Prime Minister Cesare Balbo (briefly)
- Papal Prime Minister Pellegrino Rossi
- Papal Foreign Affairs Minister Terenzio Mamiani della Rovere
- Writer Alessandro Manzoni
- Monsignor Antonio Rosmini-Serbati
- Marquess Gino Capponi
- Physicist Carlo Matteucci
- Historian Luigi Tosti

== Bibliography ==
- Anzilotti, Antonio (1917). Dal neoguelfismo all'idea liberale. Florence: Società Dante Alighieri.
- Momigliano, Felice (1922). "Gli albori del neoguelfismo in Piemonte". Rivista d'Italia. 25 (11): 265–272.
- Scoppola, Pietro (1963). Dal neoguelfismo alla democrazia cristiana. Rome: Studium.
- De Rosa, Gabriele (1964). "Le associazioni cattoliche dal neoguelfismo all'Unità". In Paolo Brezzi (ed.). I cattolici dall'800 ad oggi. Brescia: Morcelliana.
- Fontana, Sandro (1968). La controrivoluzione cattolica in Italia: 1820-1830. Brescia: Morcelliana.
- De Rosa, Gabriele (1970). "La crisi del neoguelfismo e la questione romana". Studi Romani. 18 (3): 285–297.
- Ghisalberti, Carlo (1999). "The unitary state and federalism in Italy". Parliaments, Estates and Representation. 19 (1): 173–181. doi:10.1080/02606755.1999.9522081.
