= Claudio Gabriele de Launay =

Italian politician of the Kingdom of Sardinia (1786-1850)

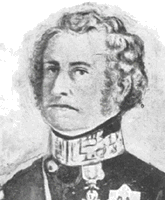

Prime Minister of Sardinia
- In office 27 March 1849 – 7 May 1849
- Monarch: Victor Emmanuel II
- Preceded by: Agostino Chiodo
- Succeeded by: Massimo d'Azeglio

Personal details
- Born: 6 October 1786 Duingt, Kingdom of Sardinia
- Died: 21 February 1850 (aged 63) Turin, Kingdom of Sardinia
- Political party: Independent

Claudio Gabriele de Launay (6 October 1786 – 21 February 1850) was an Italian military officer who served as Prime Minister of the Kingdom of Sardinia from 27 March to 7 May 1849. Previously he had been the last Viceroy of Sardinia from 1843 to 1848.

== Biography ==
De Launay, born in a noble family from the French-speaking region of Savoy, was the son of Count Luigi Filiberto de Launay and the French noblewoman Anne de la Balme. He too married a French noblewoman, Camille Angelique Caze de Méry.

He started his military career by participating to the sixth and seventh anti-French coalitions. After the fall of Napoleon, de Launay re-entered the Savoyard army and was promoted to the Maggiore grade in 1825, Colonel in 1831 and Luogotenente Generale in 1843, the same year in which he became the last Viceroy of Sardinia.

After the defeat in the First War of Independence in Italy, de Launay was elected Prime Minister of the Kingdom of Sardinia in 1849, holding at the same time the office of Foreign Minister, the first one after Vittorio Emanuele II's ascent to the throne. After the dissolution of the Parliament due to the overcoming of the Italian crisis, the king put in his place the moderate liberal Massimo d'Azeglio, before elections took place. De Launay was subsequently nominated Generale d'Armata and later retired to private life.

De Launay died in Turin in 1850.
