= Portrait of Massimo d'Azeglio =

Painting by Francesco Hayez

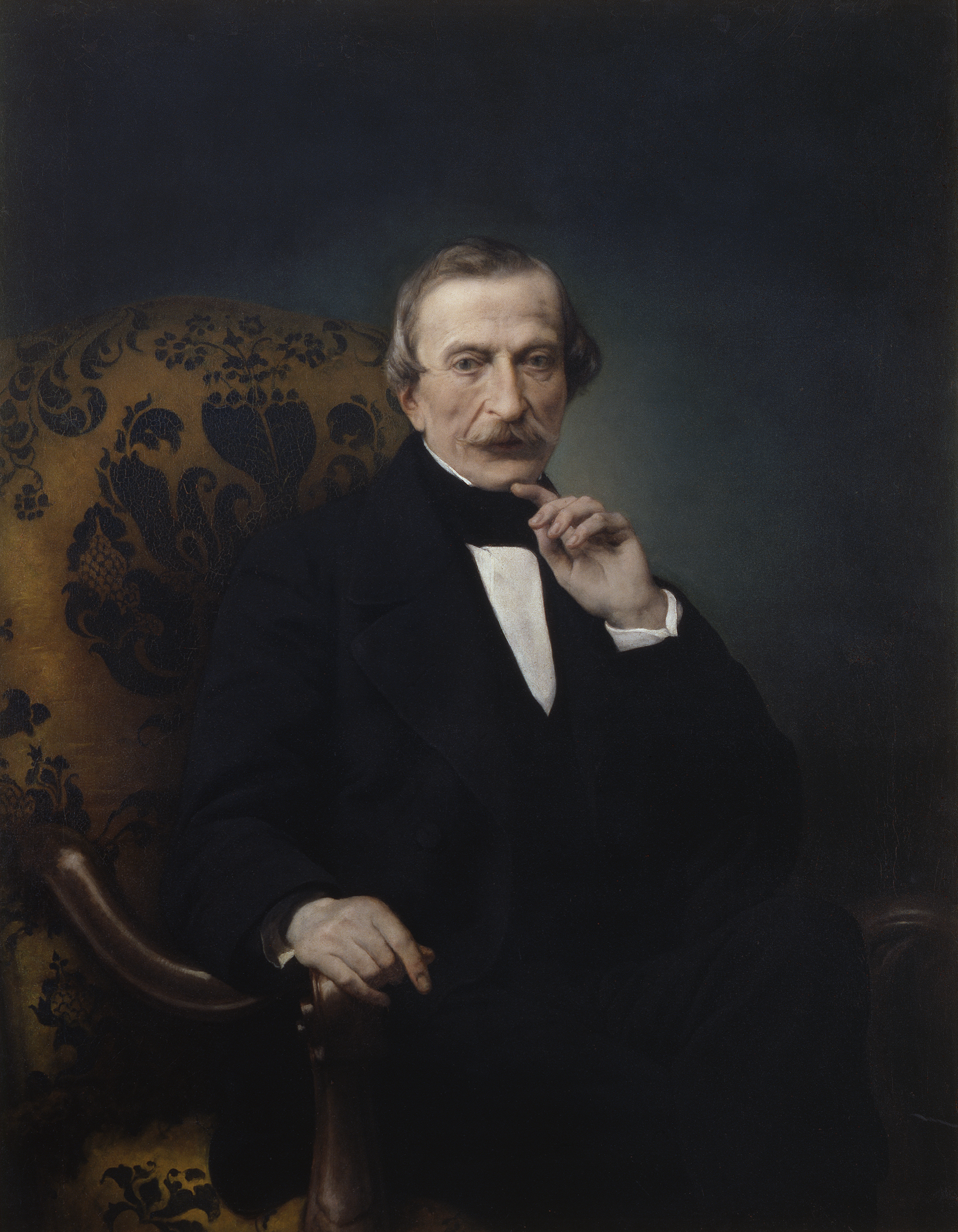
- Artist: Francesco Hayez
- Year: 1864
- Type: Oil on canvas, portrait painting
- Dimensions: 118 cm × 192 cm (46 in × 76 in)
- Location: Pinacoteca di Brera; Milan

Portrait of Massimo d'Azeglio (Italian: Ritratto di Massimo d’Azeglio) is an 1864 portrait painting by the Italian artist Francesco Hayez. It depicts Massimo d'Azeglio, a figure associated with the movement for Italian Unification who served as Prime Minister of Piedmont-Sardinia. He was a noted Romantic who produced novels and paintings that reflected his support of the liberation of Northern Italy from the Austrian Empire. He was the son-in-law of Alessandro Manzoni and a political rival of Count Cavour.

Hayez based the painting on an 1859 photograph of d’Azeglio by Charles Disdéri. Around the same time he also produced a portrait of Cavour. Yoday the painting is in the collection of the Pinacoteca di Brera in Milan.

== Bibliography ==
- Bertone, Virginia. Massimo d'Azeglio e l'invenzione del paesaggio istoriato. Edizioni GAM, 2002.
- Mazzocca, Fernando . Francesco Hayez: catalogo ragionato. F. Motta, 1994.
- Watts, Laura L. Italian Painting in the Age of Unification. Taylor & Francis, 2021.
