= Gabrio Casati =

Italian politician

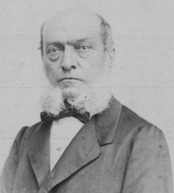

Prime Minister of Sardinia
- In office 28 July 1848 – 15 August 1848
- Preceded by: Cesare Balbo
- Succeeded by: Cesare Alfieri di Sostegno

4th Rector of Milan
- In office 1837–1848
- Preceded by: Antonio Durini
- Succeeded by: Franz Graf von Wimpffen

7th President of the Senate
- In office 2 November 1865 – 21 November 1870
- Preceded by: Giuseppe Manno
- Succeeded by: Vincenzo Fardella Torrearsa

Personal details
- Born: 2 August 1798; Milan, Cisalpine Republic
- Died: 13 November 1873 (aged 75); Milan, Kingdom of Italy
- Political party: Moderate Party (1848–1861); Historical Right (1861–1873)
- Profession: Politician

Gabrio Casati (2 August 1798 – 13 November 1873) was an Italian politician who served as the Prime Minister of the Kingdom of Sardinia from 28 July to 15 August 1848.

== Political career ==
During the Five Days of Milan he had a primary role and led the temporary government.

As Minister of Education, he passed the Casati law, which laid the ground for the unitarian Italy mass education system.

He was twice president of the Senate of Italy (8 November 1865 – 13 February 1867, 21 March 1867 – 2 November 1870).

== Death ==
Casati died in Milan and was interred in Mausoleo Casati Stampa in Muggiò urban cemetery.
