= Moderate Party (Italy) =

Political group active in the Kingdom of Sardinia

Moderate Party Partito Moderato
- Leader: Massimo d'Azeglio; Cesare Balbo; Camillo Benso di Cavour; Vincenzo Gioberti
- Founded: 1848
- Dissolved: 1861
- Preceded by: Neo-Guelphism
- Succeeded by: Historical Right
- Headquarters: Turin, Kingdom of Sardinia
- Ideology: Confederalism; Liberalism; Romantic nationalism
- Political position: Big tent

The Moderate Party (Italian: Partito Moderato), collectively called Moderates (Italian: Moderati), was an Italian pre-Unification political movement active during the Risorgimento (1815–1861). Moderates were never a formal party but only a movement of liberal-minded reformist patriots, usually secular, from politics, military, literature, and philosophy. As a big tent, Moderates generally supported confederalism, liberalism, and Romantic nationalism. Its factions, also informally divided between three main tendencies (neo-Guelphs, neutralists, and neo-Ghibellins), included both monarchists (with some supporting the House of Savoy and others supporting the pope), as well as a minority of republicans.

== History ==
Since the Congress of Vienna, inside the Italian Peninsula was diffused a reformist and Romantic moment, inspired from Jacobinism and Bonapartism, and exposed in the Revolutions of 1820 against the reactionary Congress System. Many patriots, soldiers, and intellectuals took part in the revolutions. Within this liberal movement, the idea of unifying the Italian states and making the peninsula independent from foreign domination developed strongly. With time, Moderates demarcated themselves from radical and republican organizations like Young Italy of Giuseppe Mazzini and Carboneria, among others. Moderates and radicals mainly disagreed on the methods to unite Italy: the former supported secret pacts and strategic alliances between the patriotic movement and the other European powers, whereas Mazzini's supporters called a popular revolution to establish a democratic republic. In contrast to the democrats and radicals, their reformist programme was based on legality. The Moderate Party was thus formed in Italy, representing all those personalities in favour of national unification but against revolutionary methods, especially after the failure of the uprisings of 1820–1821 and 1830–1831 organized by the Carboneria.

Preceded by neo-Guelphism, of which it was the practical development, among its main protagonists and propagandists were Cesare Balbo with Le spera d'Italia (1844) and Massimo d'Azeglio; Moderates aimed at the birth of a confederation between the states of the peninsula, a series of reforms, and then of liberal constitutions. The movement inspired the reformist movement of 1846–1847 but after the disappointments of 1848 suffered an eclipse; it recovered thanks to Camillo Benso, Count of Cavour, abandoned federalism, and completed national unification under the House of Savoy in 1859–1861. After the failure of the Revolutions of 1848 in the Italian states that had been attempted by Mazzinians and republicans, the republican ideas declined among Moderates. During this time, several politicians of other Italian states were members of the group. In the Kingdom of Sardinia, the leaders were d'Azeglio and Cavour, representing the parliamentary Right, and Urbano Rattazzi, representing the Left; in the Papal States, the movement was headed by Terenzio, Count Mamiani della Rovere, and Pellegrino Rossi, the last murdered by a republican plot in 1848; and in the Kingdom of the Two Sicilies, prominent Moderates were brothers Bertrando and Silvio Spaventa. When the Kingdom of Italy was founded in 1861, Moderates merged in the parliamentary Right and Left, the two Piedmontese parliamentary group that would monopolize the politics of the new Italian state for almost half-century. After the death of Cavour, they represented the Right, which governed the country until 1876.

== Tendencies and members ==
Differently by democrats and radical republicans, Moderates were only circles of intellectuals, aristocrats, soldiers, and businessmen with patriotic tendencies, being placed in among Romantic nationalists. The Moderate Party was not cohesive because its members were of different political ideologies, ranging from continental liberalism to soft conservatism. Initially, the movement was not too nationalist, preferring a federation or coalition between the several Italian states, and later supported its reformist policies within legalist means. When the possibility of an unified Italian state became real, a new question of division was the form that the new Italian state would have. The likes of Vincenzo Gioberti, Alessandro Manzoni, and Antonio Rosmini-Serbati supported a confederation of states led by the pope, while others, such as Francesco Domenico Guerrazzi and Giovanni Battista Niccolini, supported the Savoys, or simply claimed for a centralized state headed by a monarch, without differences if a Savoy or other. There were also those who switched sides, such as Balbo, and even a minority of republicans.

Neo-Guelphs

- Gino Capponi
- Vincenzo Gioberti
- Alessandro Manzoni
- Carlo Matteucci
- Antonio Rosmini-Serbati
- Pellegrino Rossi
- Terenzio della Rovere
- Luigi Tosti
- Carlo Troya

Neutral

- Cesare Alfieri di Sostegno
- Massimo d'Azeglio
- Gabrio Casati
- Carlo Filangieri
- Luigi Settembrini
- Ruggero Settimo
- Carlo Zucchi

Neo-Ghibellines

- Cesare Balbo (switched side)
- Carlo Cattaneo (left for Action Party)
- Santorre De Rossi, Count of Santarosa
- Francesco Domenico Guerrazzi
- Giovanni Battista Niccolini
- Florestano Pepe
- Guglielmo Pepe
- Gabriele Rossetti

== See also ==
- Italian nationalism
- Liberalism and radicalism in Italy
