= Alfonso Capecelatro =

His Eminence Alfonso Capecelatro C.O.
- Archbishop of Capua
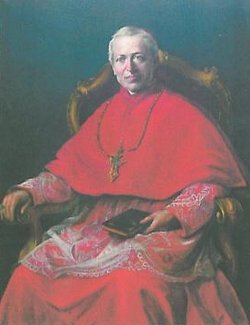
- Church: Roman Catholic Church
- Archdiocese: Capua
- See: Capua
- Appointed: 20 August 1880
- Installed: 21 November 1880
- Term ended: 14 November 1912
- Predecessor: Francesco Saverio Apuzzo
- Successor: Gennaro Cosenza
- Other post: Cardinal-Priest of Santa Maria del Popolo (1886–1912)
- Previous post: Cardinal-Priest of Santi Nereo ed Achilleo (1885–86)

Orders
- Ordination: 23 May 1847 by Sisto Riario Sforza
- Consecration: 28 October 1880 by Raffaele Monaco La Valletta
- Created cardinal: 27 July 1885 by Pope Leo XIII
- Rank: Cardinal-Priest

Personal details
- Born: Alfonso Capecelatro; 5 February 1824 Marseille, Kingdom of France
- Died: 14 November 1912 (aged 88) Capua, Kingdom of Italy
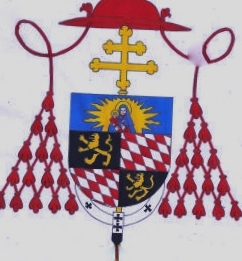
- Coat of arms

Styles of Alfonso Capecelatro
- Reference style: His Eminence
- Spoken style: Your Eminence
- Religious style: Monsignor
- Informal style: Cardinal
- See: Capua

Alfonso Capecelatro (Marseille, 5 February 1824 – 14 November 1912) was an Italian Archbishop of Capua, ecclesiastical writer, Vatican librarian, and Cardinal.

== Life ==
He was descended from the family of the dukes of Castelpagano. His father served under Joachim Murat, adopted the political principles of the Napoleonic period, and voluntarily exiled himself to Malta and Marseilles, when Ferdinand I of Naples, after his restoration by the Congress of Laibach, set about the repression of political Liberalism.

The family returned to Italy in 1826 and to Naples in 1830. At sixteen Alfonso entered the Oratory of St. Philip Neri at Naples. Ordained priest in 1847, he devoted himself to the confessional, preaching, and various charitable enterprises, but also to ecclesiastical studies, giving especial attention to ecclesiastical history. He was particularly drawn to Peter Damian, Catherine of Siena, Philip Neri, and Alphonsus Liguori, whose biographies he wrote.

He attacked Ernest Renan's "Life of Christ", then widely circulated in Italy, and afterwards himself published a "Life of Jesus Christ". He devoted three volumes to an exposition of Catholic doctrine and two to the Christian virtues, and published several volumes of sermons.

Meanwhile, he maintained personal relations with various persons, particularly priests and religious at Naples, among them the Franciscan Ludovico da Casoria, whose biography he wrote, and two priests Ignatius Persico and Casanova, with whom he often discussed methods of catechetical instruction. He corresponded with other Liberal Catholics, among them Manzoni, Cesare Cantu, Dupanloup, and Montalembert. Pope Leo XIII summoned him to Rome, together with Luigi Tosti, and made him assistant librarian, wishing thereby not only to honour a learned man, but also to make use of him for the work of reconciliation which occupied his mind until 1887.

In 1880, Capecelatro was appointed Archbishop of Capua. There he passed his life in the administration of his diocese, literary labours, and works of charity. He was made a cardinal by Leo XIII in 1885. He received some votes in the papal conclave of 1903.

In the pastoral letters and other minor works published in the last years of his life, he treats the great questions of modern times, especially those relating to public life in Italy. He had little influence in ecclesiastical politics, and in the end was overwhelmed by the course of events in the modernist crisis in the Catholic Church.

Records
Preceded by Anton Josef Gruscha	Oldest living Member of the Sacred College; 05 August 1911 – 14 November 1912	Succeeded by Angelo di Pietro
