= Cesare Alfieri di Sostegno =

Italian politician and diplomat

Count Cesare Alfieri di Sostegno
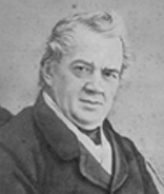

Prime Minister of Sardinia
- In office 19 August 1848 – 11 October 1848
- Monarch: Charles Albert
- Preceded by: Gabrio Casati
- Succeeded by: Ettore Perrone di San Martino

3rd President of the Senate
- In office 8 June 1855 – 28 December 1860
- Preceded by: Giuseppe Manno
- Succeeded by: Ruggero Settimo

Personal details
- Born: 13 August 1799 Turin, Kingdom of Sardinia
- Died: 16 April 1869 (aged 69) Florence, Kingdom of Italy
- Party: Moderate Party
- Parent(s): Carlo Emanuele and Carlotta Duchi della Cassa
- Occupation: Diplomat, politician

Cesare Alfieri di Sostegno (13 August 1799 – 16 April 1869) was an Italian politician and diplomat who served as Prime Minister of the Kingdom of Sardinia from 19 August to 11 October 1848.

== Biography ==
Born in Turin, the cousin of poet Vittorio Alfieri, he began his diplomatic career in 1816 in the State Secretary, then he was assigned to the embassy in Paris, where he father was the representative of the Kingdom of Sardinia. Later he worked in the embassies of The Hague and Berlin, and then he took part as assistant in the congresses of Aachen (1818), Troppau (1820) and Ljubljana (1821). This experience granted Alfieri the title of ambassador in St. Petersburg in 1824.

Two years later he returned to Turin, where he received the position of First Squire of the throne heir, Charles Albert. In 1838 he was made member of the newly created Council of State and in 1842 of the Agrarian Association of Turin. In 1847 Alfieri became the first holder of the Ministry of Public Instruction. Together with Luigi Des Ambrois and Giacino Borelli, he was one of the authors of the Statuto Albertino, the first Italian constitution. On 3 April 1848 he was elected Senator, and served as Prime Minister of Sardinia from August to October 1848. He was President of the Senate of Sardinia from 1855 to 1860.

He died in Florence in 1869.
