= Luigi Ferri =

Italian philosopher (1826–1895)

Luigi Ferri (15 June 1826 – 1895) was an Italian philosopher born in Bologna.

His education was obtained mainly at the École Normale Supérieure in Paris, where his father, a painter and architect, was engaged in the construction of the Théâtre Italien. From his twenty-fifth year, he began to lecture in the colleges of Évreux, Dieppe, Blois and Toulouse. Later, he was lecturer at Annecy and Casal-Montferrat, and became head of the education department under Mamiani in 1860.

Three years later, he was appointed to the chair of philosophy at the Istituto di Perfezionamento at Florence, and, in 1871, was made professor of philosophy in the University of Rome La Sapienza. On the death of Mamiani in 1885, he became editor of the Filosofia delle scuole italiane, whose title he changed to Rivista italiana di filosofia. He wrote both on psychology and on metaphysics, but is known especially as a historian of philosophy.

His original work is eclectic, combining the psychology of his teachers, Jules Simon, Saisset and Mamiani, with the idealism of Rosmini and Gioberti. Among his works may be mentioned:

- Studii sulla coscienza
- Il Fenomeno nelle sue relazioni con la sensazione
- Della idea del vera
- Della filosofia del diritto presso Aristotile (1885)
- Il Genio di Aristotile
- La Psicologia di Pietro Pomponazzi (1877)
- most important, Essai sur l'histoire de la philosophie en Italie au XIX' siècle (Paris, 1869)
- La Psychologie de l'association depuis Hobbes jusqu'à nos jours
