= Luigi Tosti =

Dom Luigi Tosti
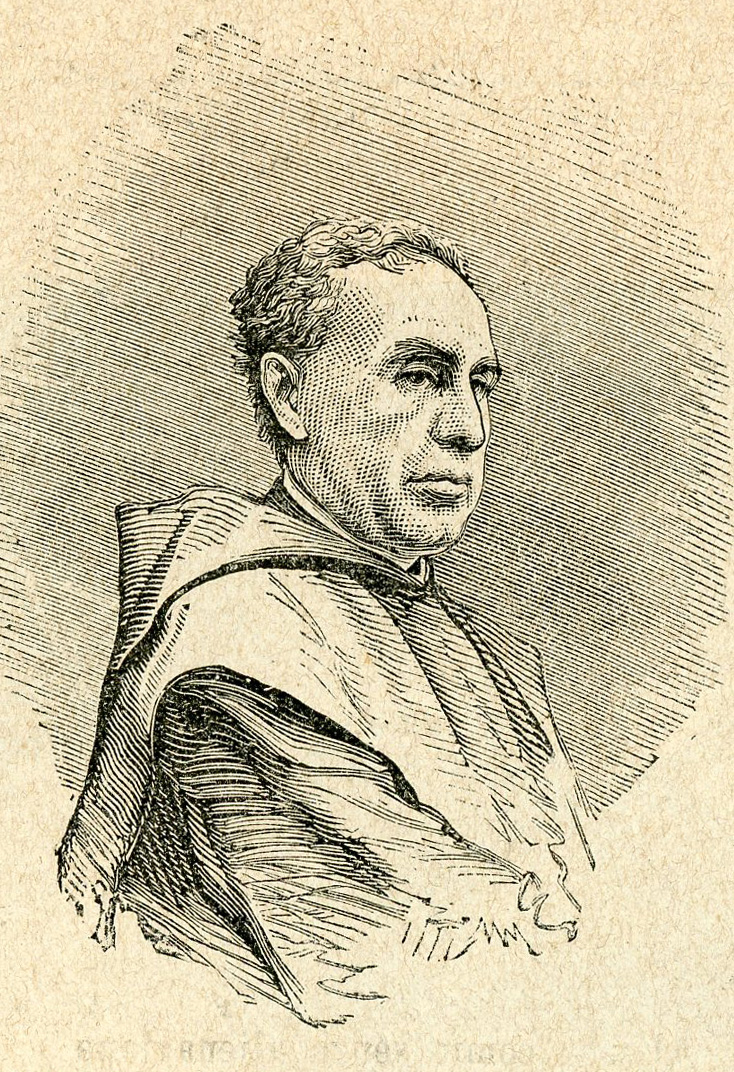
- Luigi Tosti
- Born: February 13, 1811; Naples, Kingdom of Naples
- Died: 24 September 1897 (aged 86); Monte Cassino, Kingdom of Italy
- Occupations: Benedictine monk; Historian; Political theorist
- Parent(s): Giovanni Tosti and Vittoria Tosti (née Corigliano)

Academic background
- Academic advisor: Carlo Troya

Academic work
- Discipline: Medieval history

Luigi Tosti OSB (Naples, 13 February 1811 – Monte Cassino, 24 September 1897) was a Benedictine historian.

== Life ==
His father, Count Giovanni Tosti, descended from an ancient Calabrian family, died young, and so his mother, Vittoria Corigliano, entrusted the child to his uncle, a monk at Monte Cassino. In 1819 Tosti became a pupil at the abbey, and was drawn early towards the monastic life.

He was sent to Rome to complete his studies, was ordained priest in 1833, and soon returned to Monte Cassino, where for twenty years he taught the doctrines of Aquinas. About 1829 he had begun a deep study of history, and in 1842 he published his Storia della badia di Monte Cassino, soon followed by the Storia di Bonifazio VIII (History of Pope Boniface VIII). His Storia della Lega Lombarda (History of the Lombard League), dedicated to Pius IX, appeared in 1848 and was a trumpet-call to the Neo-Guelph party. He worked so hard that in 1851 he published the Storia di Abelardo e dei suoi tempi, the Storia del Concilio di Constanza (History of the Council of Constance) in 1853, the Storia dell' origine dello scisma greco in 1856, La Contessa Matilde e i Romani pontefici in 1859, and in 1861 the Prolegomeni alla storia universale della Chiesa.

Tosti took part in the nationalist movement blessed by Pius IX. In 1844 he had planned a review, L'Ateneo italiano, for the purpose of raising the papacy to the head of his Risorgimento. The Neapolitan police authorities opposed the idea. They forbade Tosti to engage in the projected mediation between pope and triumvirs of the ephemeral Roman Republic; this mediation was being advocated by the French envoy, Comte d'Harcourt. Pius IX intervened personally to secure the liberation of the imprisoned Tosti, who, as Cardinal Alfonso Capecelatro relates, had been accused of belonging to a band of murderous conspirators. William Temple, the English ambassador at Naples, also opposed his imprisonment. Tosti sought consolation in the study of the Holy Scriptures and his book, Ricordi biblici, was the fruit of this experience.

He was sad to see convents threatened by a law of expropriation passed by the Parliament of the new Italian Kingdom and appealed to distinguished friends, such as the British statesman, William Gladstone, to obtain some exemption for Monte Cassino, which he likewise procured later for the Abbey of Grottaferrata, the Sacro Speco of Subiaco, etc. Pained by these events, Tosti refused a chair in the University of Pisa, but later became assistant archivist of the Vatican, under Leo XIII. This pope's allocution in May, 1887, inviting the Italian Government to make peace, presided over by the former revolutionary, Francesco Crispi, rekindled Tosti's patriotism.

Deputed by the pope to negotiate the restoration of St. Paul's to the Benedictines, Tosti hoped to effect an official reconciliation of the Vatican and the Quirinale. Crispi's impatience, mutual opposition, and the distrusts of French diplomats, thwarted his efforts, and he had to retract publicly his brochure La conciliazione. He withdrew to Monte Cassino and undertook his Della vita di S. Benedetto (Of the Life of St Benedict). Moved by the pope's appeal to the English in 1896, he renewed his efforts with Gladstone, in favour of a reunion of the Churches.

== Works ==
- History of Pope Boniface VIII and His Times: With Notes and Documentary. Translated by Eugene Joseph Donnelly. New York: Christian Press Association Publishing Company. 1911.
- Storia Della Badia Di Monte-Cassino. Vol. 1. Naples: Stabilimento Poligrafico. 1843.
- Storia della Lega lombarda. Monte Cassino: Tipografia dei benedettini. 1848.
- La contessa Matilde e i romani pontefici. Rome: L. Pasqualucci. 1887.
- La Conciliazione. Rome: L. Pasqualucci. 1887.
- Torquato Tasso e i benedettini cassinesi. Monte Cassino: Tipografia dei benedettini. 1877.

== Sources ==
Attribution

- Cites:
  - Bellesheim, A. (1899). "Don Luigi Tosti, Benediktiner auf Monte Cassino. 1811-1897". Der Katholik. 18 (2): 136–154.
  - Capecelatro, Alfonso (1899). Commemorazione di D. Luigi Tosti, Abate Cassinese. Monte Cassino.
  - Cipolla, Carlo (1900–1901). "Luigi Tosti e le sue relazioni col Piemonte". Atti della R. Accademia delle Scienze di Torino. XXXVI: 116–145.
  - D'Ovidio, Francesco (1898). "Don Luigi Tosti". Rivista d'Italia. I: 24–44.
  - Gay, Jules (1904). "Le père Tosti et la «Conciliation»". Revue de Paris. VI: 178–200.
  - Pistelli, Ermenegildo (1898). "Il padre Tosti". Archivio Storico Italiano. XXI: 241–254.
  - Quintavalle, Ferruccio (1907). La conciliazione fra l'Italia e il papato nelle lettere del padre Tosti e del sen. Gabrio Casati [The Reconciliation between Italy and the Papacy]. Milan: tip. L. F. Cogliati.
- Renan, Ernest (1859). "Dom Luigi Tosti ou le parti guelfe dans l'Italie contemporaine (1851)". Essais de morale et de critique. Paris. pp. 205–241.
- Buonaiuti, Ernesto (1928). "Padre Tosti e il rinnovamento cattolico". Ricerche Religiose. 4: 149–154.
- Amighetti, Paolo Maria (2019). "Un benedettino sul Carroccio alla vigilia del Quarantotto: Luigi Tosti e la Storia della Lega lombarda". Rassegna Storica del Risorgimento. CVI (1/2): 51–74. doi:10.1400/288670.
