= Cesare Balbo =

Italian writer and statesman (1789–1853)

The Honourable Count Cesare Balbo
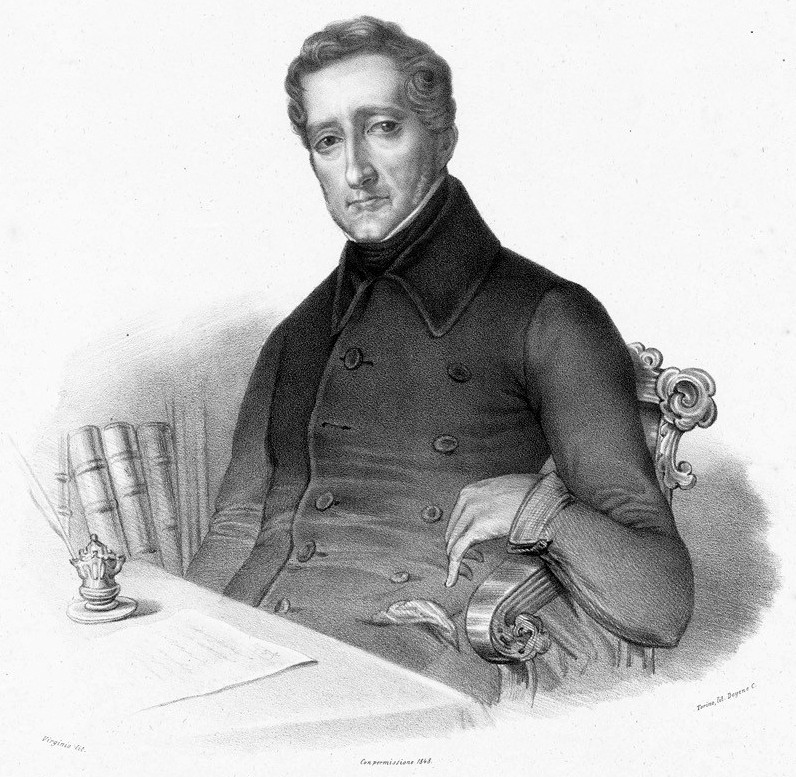

Prime Minister of Sardinia
- In office 18 March 1848 – 27 July 1848
- Monarch: Charles Albert
- Preceded by: Office created
- Succeeded by: Gabrio Casati

Personal details
- Born: 21 November 1789; Turin, Kingdom of Sardinia
- Died: 3 June 1853 (aged 63); Turin, Kingdom of Sardinia
- Political party: Neo-Ghibelline
- Parent(s): Prospero Balbo and Enrichetta Taparelli d'Azeglio
- Occupation: Writer, politician

Cesare Balbo, Conte di Vinadio (21 November 1789 – 3 June 1853) was an Italian writer, historian, and statesman from Piedmont. A prominent figure in the early stages of the Italian Risorgimento, he is best known for his political essays advocating a moderate and constitutional approach to unification under the leadership of the House of Savoy. Balbo served as the first constitutional Prime Minister of the Kingdom of Sardinia in 1848 and authored influential works such as Delle speranze d’Italia (1844), which shaped liberal-conservative thought in 19th-century Italy.

== Biography ==
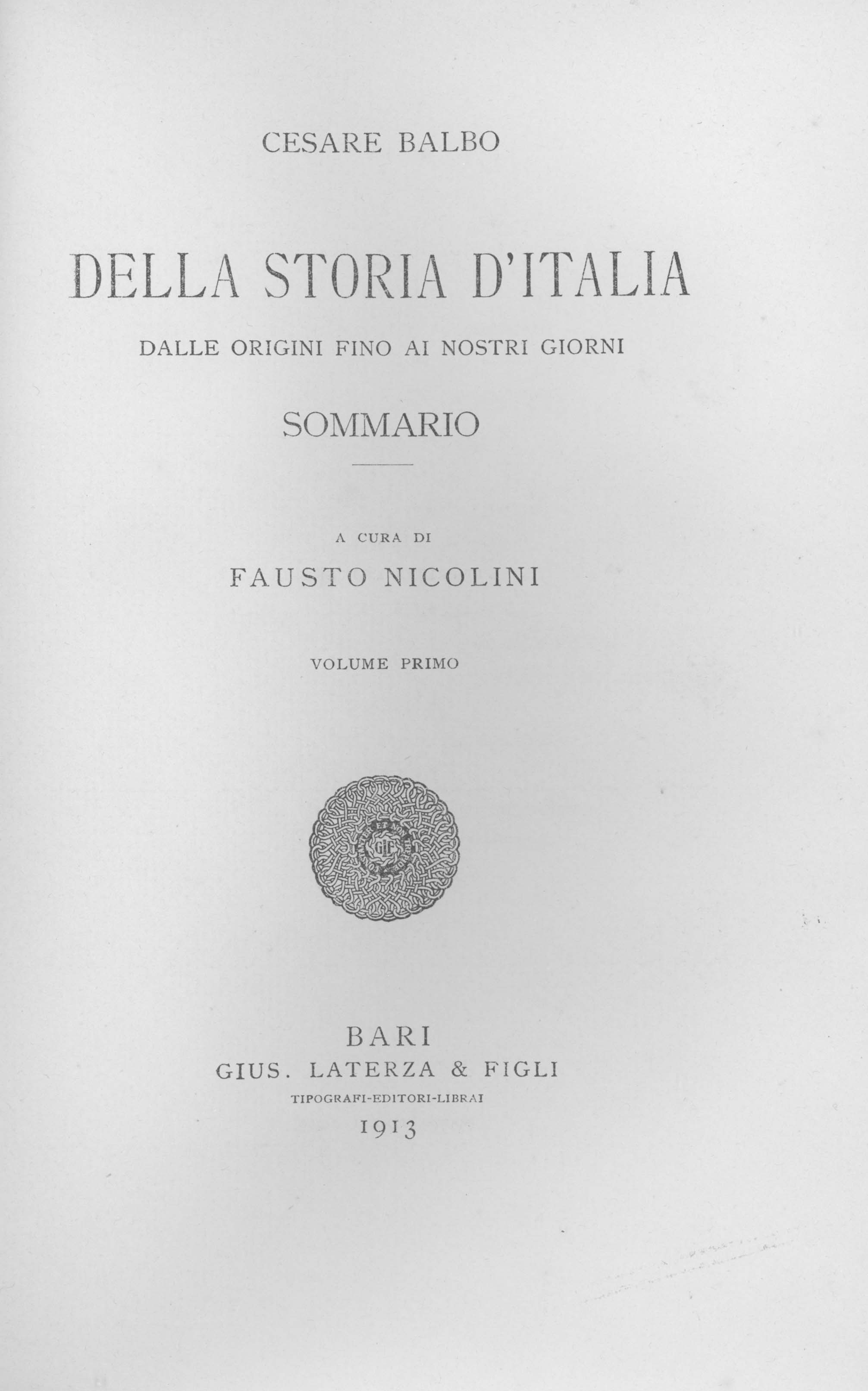
Storia d'Italia dalle origini fino ai nostri giorni, 1913

Balbo was born in Turin on 21 November 1789. His father, Prospero Balbo, a member of a noble Piedmontese family, held a high position at the court of the Kingdom of Sardinia and was serving as mayor of the capital at the time of Cesare's birth. His mother, Enrichetta Taparelli d'Azeglio, died when he was three years old; and he was brought up in the house of his great-grandmother, the countess of Bugino. In 1798 he joined his father at Paris. From 1808 to 1814 Balbo served in various capacities under the Napoleonic empire in Florence, Rome, Paris and in Illyria. On the fall of Napoleon, he entered the service of his native country. While his father was appointed minister of the interior, he entered the army, and undertook political missions to Paris and London. On the outbreak of the revolution of 1821, of which he disapproved, although he was suspected of sympathizing with it, he was forced into exile; and though not long after he was allowed to return to Piedmont, all public service was denied him.

Reluctantly, and with frequent endeavours to obtain some appointment, he gave himself up to literature as the only means left him to influence the destinies of his country. The great object of his labours was to help in securing the independence of Italy from foreign control. Of true Italian unity, he had no expectation and no desire, but he was devoted to the house of Savoy, which he foresaw was destined to change the fate of Italy. A confederation of separate states, not under the supremacy of the pope like Gioberti, but led by Piedmont, was the genuine ideal of Balbo. But Gioberti, in his Primato, seemed to him to neglect the first essential of independence, which he accordingly inculcated in his "Speranze or Hopes of Italy", in which he suggests that Austria should seek compensation in the Balkans for the inevitable loss of her Italian provinces. Balbo believed that the papacy could become an enemy of a large, united Italy (as it did, indeed, become for many years). Preparation, banter military and moral, alertness and patience were his constant theme.

He did not desire revolution, but reform; and thus he became the leader of a moderate party, and the steady opponent not only of despotism but of democracy. At last in 1848 his hopes were to some extent satisfied by the constitution granted by the king, known as the Statuto Albertino. He was appointed a member of the commission on the electoral law, and became the first constitutional prime minister of Piedmont, but only held office a few months. With the ministry of d’Azeglio, which soon after came to power, he was on friendly terms, and his pen continued the active defence of his political principles till his death on 3 June 1853. He published Quattro Novelle in 1829; Storia d’Italia sotto i Barbari in 1830; Vita di Dante, 1839; Meditazioni Storiche, 1842—1845; Le Speranze d’Italia, 1844; Pensieri sulla Storia d’Italia, 1858; Della Monarchia rappresentativa in Italia (Florence, 1857).

== Sources ==
- Isabella, Maurizio. "Aristocratic Liberalism and Risorgimento: Cesare Balbo and Piedmontese Political Thought after 1848." History of European Ideas 39#6 (2013): 835–857.
