= List of prime ministers of the Kingdom of Sardinia =

The prime minister of the Kingdom of Sardinia (Italian: primo ministro del Regno di Sardegna), officially known as the president of the Council of Ministers of the Kingdom of Sardinia (presidente del Consiglio dei ministri del Regno di Sardegna), was the head of government of the Kingdom of Sardinia, which was de facto based in Piedmont (de jure since the Perfect Fusion of 1847) and as a result is also known as Piedmont–Sardinia, and is the legal predecessor of the Kingdom of Italy and thus of the office of prime minister of Italy.

The office was created in 1730 as Grand Chancellor (gran cancelliere). After a brief break of two years in 1740 and another after 1745, the office was revived in 1756 as First Secretary of State (primo segretario di Stato). Following another break after 1763, the office reverted back to that of Grand Chancellor between 1768–1779 and 1789–1793. The office, known in English as prime minister, was revived with the granting of the Albertine Statute in 1848 until the proclamation of the Kingdom of Italy in 1861.

== Heads of government of the Kingdom of Sardina (1730–1848) ==
Grand Chancellor	Term start	Term end	Ref.
Giovanni Cristoforo Zoppi	1730	1740	
Carlo Vincenzo Ferrero d'Ormea	1742	1745	

First Secretary of State	Term start	Term end	Ref.
Giuseppe Osorio Alarcòn	1756	1763	

Grand Chancellor	Term start	Term end	Ref.
Carlo Luigi Caissotti	1768	1779	
Giuseppe Ignazio Corte	1789	1793	

== Prime ministers of the Kingdom of Sardinia (1848–1861) ==
- Political parties

Moderate Party
Military

- Governments

Rightist coalition

Prime ministers of the Kingdom of Italy (1861–1946)
Portrait	Name (Birth–death)	Term of office			Political party	Cabinet	Composition	Legislature (Election)	Monarch (Reign)	Ref.
Portrait	Name (Birth–death)	Took office	Left office	Time in office	Political party	Cabinet	Composition	Legislature (Election)	Monarch (Reign)	Ref.
	Count Cesare Balbo (1789–1853)	18 March 1848	27 July 1848	131 days	Moderate Party	Balbo	Moderate • Military	I 1848	Charles Albert (1831–1849)	
	Count and Baron Gabrio Casati (1789–1873)	27 July 1848	15 August 1848	19 days	Moderate Party	Casati	Moderate • Military	I 1848	Charles Albert (1831–1849)	
	Marquess and Count Cesare Alfieri di Sostegno (1799-1869)	15 August 1848	11 October 1848	57 days	Moderate Party	Alfieri	Moderate • Military	I 1848	Charles Albert (1831–1849)	
	Count Ettore Perrone di San Martino (1789–1849)	11 October 1848	16 December 1848	66 days	Military	Perrone	Moderate • Military	I 1848	Charles Albert (1831–1849)	
	Vincenzo Gioberti (1801–1852)	16 December 1848	21 February 1849	67 days	Moderate Party	Gioberti	Moderate • Military	I 1848	Charles Albert (1831–1849)	
	General Agostino Chiodo (1791–1861)	21 February 1849	27 March 1849	34 days	Military	Chiodo	Moderate • Military	II; January; 1849	Charles Albert (1831–1849)	
	Count Claudio Gabriele de Launay (1786–1850)	27 March 1849	7 May 1849	41 days	Military	De Launay	Moderate • Military	III; July; 1849	Victor Emmanuel II (1849–1861)	
	Marquess Massimo d'Azeglio (1798–1866)	7 May 1849	21 May 1852	3 years, 168 days	Moderate Party	D'Azeglio I	Moderate • Military	IV; December; 1849	Victor Emmanuel II (1849–1861)	
	Marquess Massimo d'Azeglio (1798–1866)	21 May 1852	22 October 1852	3 years, 168 days	Moderate Party	D'Azeglio II	Moderate • Military	IV; December; 1849	Victor Emmanuel II (1849–1861)	
	Count Camillo Benso di Cavour (1810–1861)	22 October 1852	4 May 1855	6 years, 270 days	Moderate Party	Cavour I	Cavour–Rattazzi Pact; Moderate • Military	V 1853	Victor Emmanuel II (1849–1861)	
	Count Camillo Benso di Cavour (1810–1861)	4 May 1855	19 July 1859	6 years, 270 days	Moderate Party	Cavour II	Cavour–Rattazzi Pact; Moderate • Military	VI; 1857	Victor Emmanuel II (1849–1861)	
	General Alfonso Ferrero La Marmora (1804–1878)	19 July 1859	21 January 1860	186 days	Military	La Mormora I	Moderate • Military	VI; 1857	Victor Emmanuel II (1849–1861)	
	Count Camillo Benso di Cavour (1810–1861)	21 January 1860	23 March 1861	1 year, 61 days	Moderate Party	Cavour III	Moderate • Military	VII; 1860	Victor Emmanuel II (1849–1861)	

== See also ==
- Council of Ministers
- Council of Ministers (Italy)
- Kingdom of Sardinia
- Kingdom of Sardinia (1324–1720)
- King of Italy
- List of prime ministers of Italy

== Bibliography ==
=== General ===
- Bartolotta, Francesco (1971). Parlamenti e governi d'Italia dal 1848 al 1970 (in Italian). Vol. 1. V. Bianco – via Google Books.
- Bartolotta, Francesco (1971). Parlamenti e governi d'Italia dal 1848 al 1970 (in Italian). Vol. 2. V. Bianco.
- Cariche del Piemonte e Paesi uniti colla serie cronologica delle persone che le hanno occupate ed altre notizie di nuda istoria dal fine del secolo decimo sino al dicembre 1798 con qualche aggiunta relativa anche al tempo posteriore (in Italian). Vol. 1. 1798 – via Google Books.

=== Individual prime ministers ===
- D'Entrèves, Ettore Passerin (1963). "Balbo, Cesare". Dizionario Biografico degli Italiani (in Italian). Vol. 5. Rome: Italian Encyclopedia Institute – via Treccani.
