= Giuseppe Manno =

Italian politician

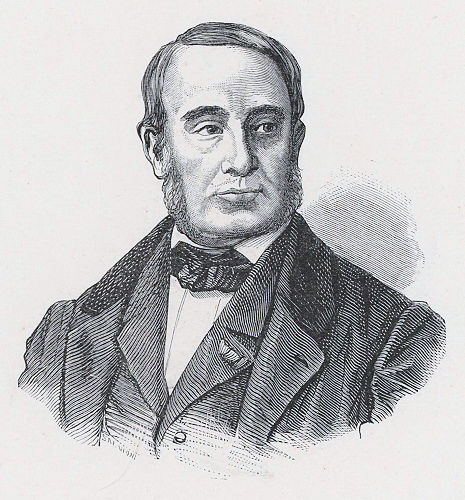
Giuseppe Manno

Giuseppe Manno (17 March 1786 – 25 January 1868) was an Italian magistrate, politician and historian. He was elected president of the Senate of the Kingdom of Sardinia, and later of the Kingdom of Italy.

== Biography ==
Manno was born in Alghero, Sardinia on 17 March 1786 to a noble family, his father was Antonio Manno and his mother was Caterina Diaz. He moved to Cagliari, where he graduated in Civil and Canon law in 1804; in 1805 he became a politician for the Reale Udienza as a substitute for the tax layer and in 1811 he collaborated for the realization of the magazine Foglio periodico di Sardegna, printed in Cagliari.

He moved to Turin in 1817, where he was appointed First official of the State Secretary for the Sardinian Affairs. He became the personal secretary of the King Charles Felix in 1821.

He was appointed as a member of the Supremo Consiglio di Sardegna (Supreme Council of Sardinia) in 1823, where he worked to modernize the legal system of the Kingdom. In 1826 he became a member of the Accademia delle Scienze di Torino, and in 1834 became Academic della Crusca.

On 14 October 1845, he was elected President of the Senate of Nice, and in 1847 was elected president of the Senate of Piedmont.

== Honours and awards ==
- Knight of the Order of Saints Maurice and Lazarus
- Comendador of the Order of Saints Maurice and Lazarus
- Knight of Grand Cross of the Order of Saints Maurice and Lazarus
- Knight of the Civil Order of Savoy
- Milite of the Military Order of Savoy

== Works ==
- Lettere di un sardo in Italia (1993 – 1816/1817), Quartu S. Elena, Astra.
- Storia di Sardegna, Torino, Alliana e Paravia, 1825–27, in 4 voll.
- De' vizi dei letterati , Torino, Alliana, 1828.
- Storia moderna della Sardegna, Torino, Favale, 1842.
- Legislation de l'ile de Sardaigne, Paris, De Fain et Thunot, 1844.
- Note sarde, Torino, Stamperia Reale, 1868.
