= Ettore Perrone di San Martino =

Italian noble and politician (1789–1849)

Ettore Perrone di San Martino The Honourable Count
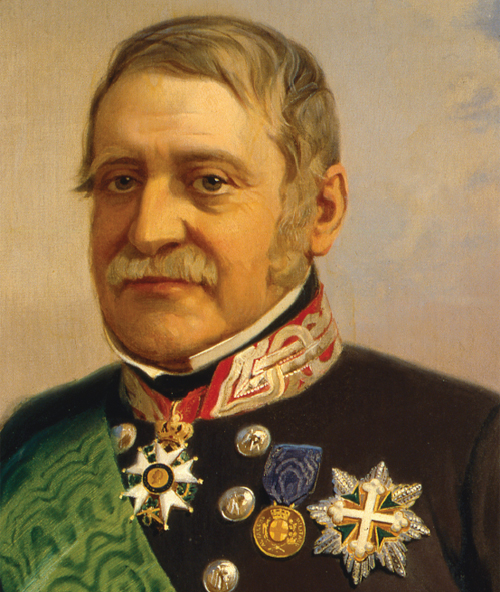

Prime Minister of Sardinia
- In office 11 October 1848 – 16 December 1848
- Monarch: Charles Albert
- Preceded by: Cesare Alfieri di Sostegno
- Succeeded by: Vincenzo Gioberti

Personal details
- Born: 12 January 1789 Turin, Kingdom of Sardinia
- Died: 29 March 1849 (aged 60) Novara, Kingdom of Sardinia
- Party: Independent
- Spouse: Jenny de Fay de La Tour-Maubourg (1837–1849)
- Children: Paolo Luigi (1834–1897); Roberto (1836–1900); Louise (1838–1880)
- Occupation: Military, politician

Ettore Perrone, Conte di San Martino (12 January 1789 in Turin – 29 March 1849) was an Italian politician and military leader.

== French military service ==
He enlisted as a volunteer soldier in the infantry in 1806, in the "Legion du Midi". He graduated from Saint-Cyr in 1806, and left the following year as second lieutenant of infantry, participating in the campaigns of 1807 and 1809. He was wounded at Battle of Wagram, earning the Legion of Honour. From 1810 to 1811, he was in Spain as a lieutenant in the Young Guard. On 24 June 1811, he joined the Grenadiers of the Old Guard. Although injured, he left for the Russian campaign using crutches. Promoted to Captain of Infantry, he fought at Lützen and Bautzen in May 1813 and was wounded with the bayonet three times at the Battle of Montmirail. On 15 March 1814, Napoleon appointed him commander of the 24th Infantry Battalion of the line. During the Hundred Days, he was appointed Adjutant to General Gérard.

== Italian unification ==
He was arrested on 3 March 1821 at the border, returning from Paris. He was involved in the Piedmont insurrection of 1821, was condemned to death but fled to France, where he joined the army and reached the rank of General. On 2 February 1833, during his exile in France, he married Jenny de Fay de La Tour-Maubourg, the granddaughter of the Marquis de La Fayette. Henry Clay attended the wedding.

== Italian military service ==
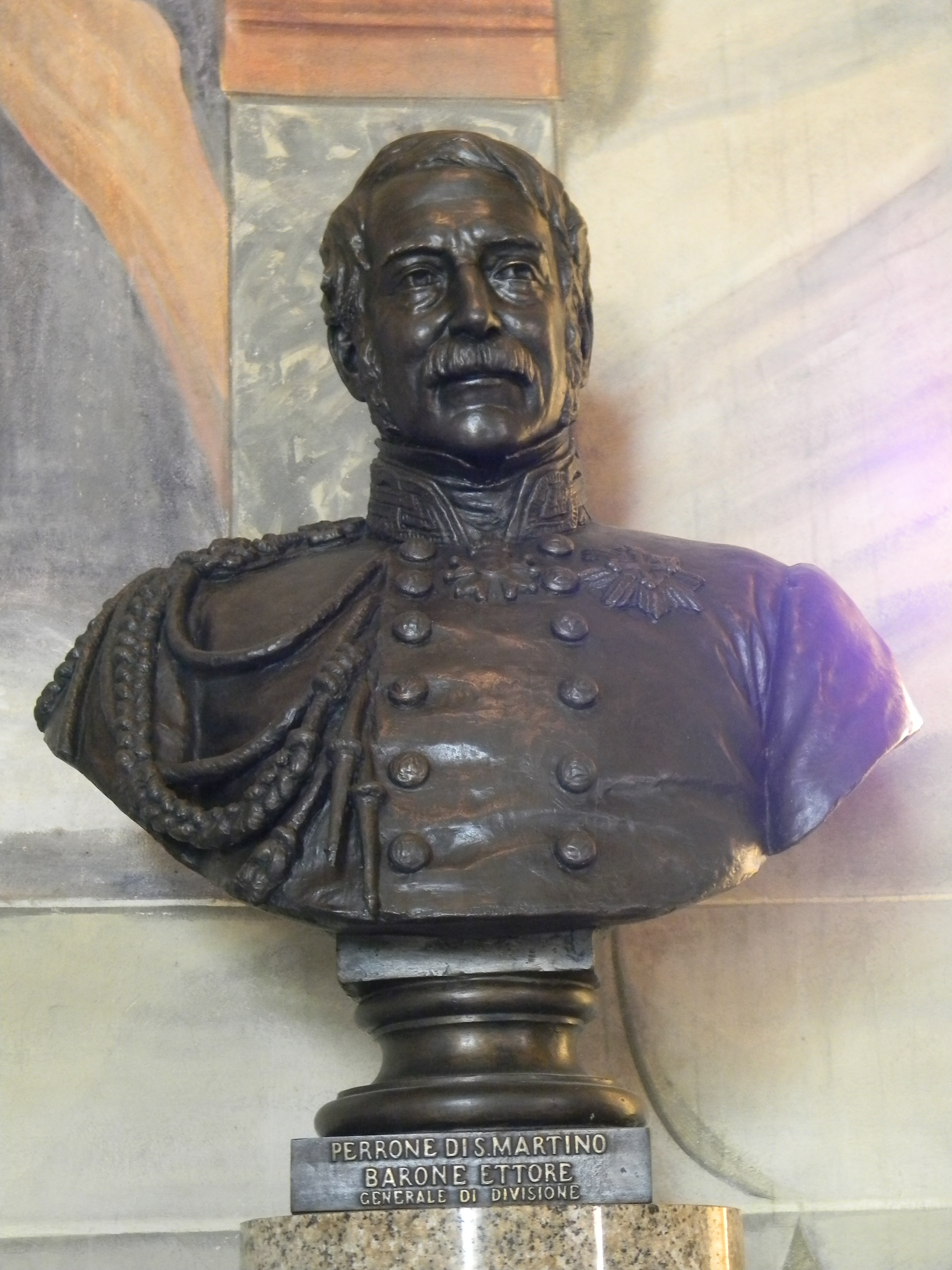
Perrone di San Martino's bust, 1850s.

In 1848 he was invited by the provisional government of Milan to join the Army of Lombardy. He became prime minister of the Kingdom of Sardinia from 11 October to 16 December 1848. He declined to send representatives to Giuseppe Montanelli's proposed Italian assembly.

He was mortally wounded at the Battle of Novara in the Piedmont, Italy, on 22 March 1849, where, as a Lieutenant-Général, he commanded the left division.

The barracks "Perrone", constructed between 1850–1852, was dedicated to him. Currently, the entire complex is used for the orientation centre of the University of the Piemonte.

== Family ==
His sister Caroline married Just Pons Florimond marquis de La Tour-Maubourg, in 1837.

Hector Perrone di San-Martino married Jenny de Fay de La Tour Maubourg, daughter of Juste-Charles de Fay de La Tour-Maubourg, and Anastasie de Lafayette.

Jenny and comte Hector Perrone di San-Martino had two sons, Paolo Luigi, comte Perrone di San Martino (1834–1897), and Roberto Perrone di San Martino (1836–1900), and a daughter, Louise Perrone Di San Martino (1 October 1838 - 14 November 1880), who married the comte Félix Rignon (1829–1914). Louise and Félix Rignon had two children, Édouard Rignon (1861–1932) and Maria Rignon (1858–1950).

His great-great-granddaughter is Paola Ruffo di Calabria, Queen of the Belgians.

== Sources ==
- Paul Ginsborg, Daniele Manin and the Venetian Revolution of 1848-49
- Howard McGaw Smyth, Piedmont and Prussia, the influence of the campaigns of 1848-1849 on the Constitutional Development of Italy, The American Historical Review, Vol LV, No.3, April 1950
- The Battle of Novaro, Forces in the Field, lastoria.org
