= Vincenzo Gioberti =

Italian philosopher and politician

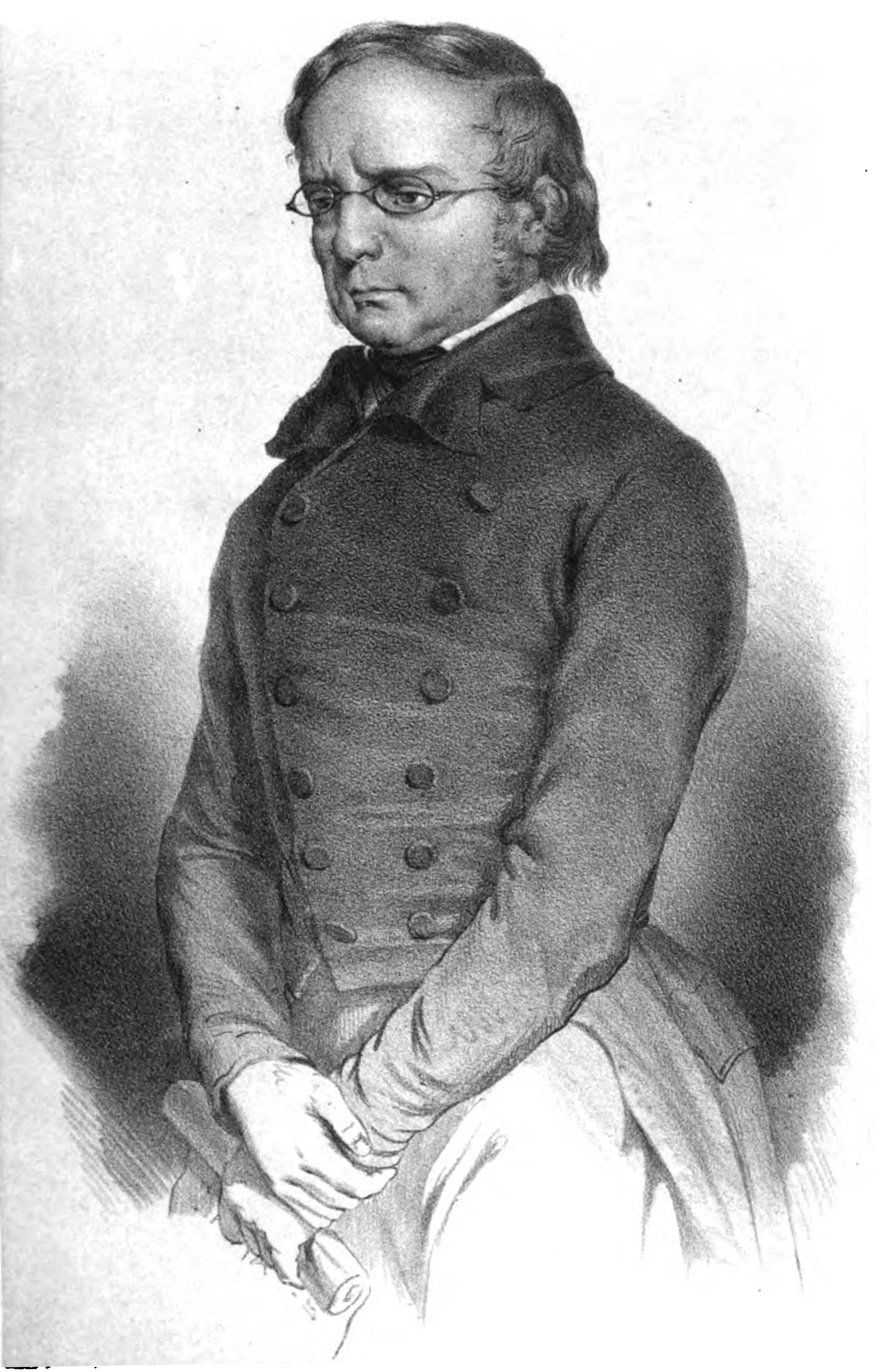

Prime Minister of Sardinia
- In office 16 December 1848 – 21 February 1849
- Monarch: Charles Albert
- Preceded by: Ettore Perrone di San Martino
- Succeeded by: Agostino Chiodo

Personal details
- Born: 5 April 1801 Turin, Kingdom of Sardinia
- Died: 26 October 1852 (aged 51) Paris, Second French Empire
- Party: Moderate Party
- Occupation: Priest, philosopher, politician
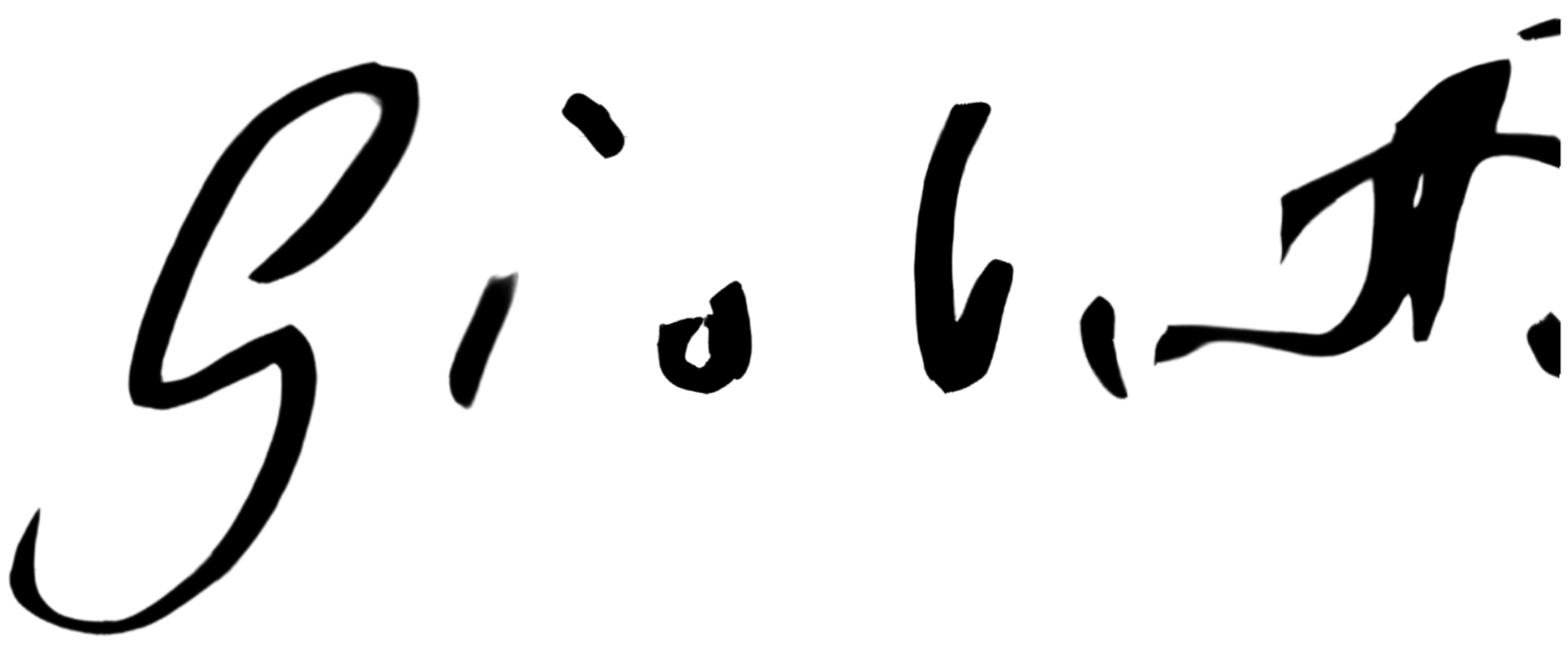
- Signature

Vincenzo Gioberti (Italian pronunciation: [vinˈtʃɛntso dʒoˈbɛrti]; 5 April 1801 – 26 October 1852) was an Italian Catholic priest, philosopher, publicist and politician who served as the Prime Minister of Sardinia from 1848 to 1849. He was a prominent spokesman for liberal Catholicism.

== Biography ==
Gioberti was born in Turin, Italy. When very young he lost his parents, and at the age of sixteen was admitted among the clerics of the court. He studied theology at the University of Turin, and obtained his doctorate there.

He was educated by the fathers of the Oratory with a view to the priesthood and ordained in 1825. In 1828, he made a journey through Lombardy, and became friendly with Alessandro Manzoni. Partly under the influence of Giuseppe Mazzini, the freedom of Italy became his ruling motive in life, its emancipation, not only from foreign masters, but from modes of thought alien to its genius, and detrimental to its European authority. This authority was in his mind connected with papal supremacy. Though in a way quite intellectual rather than political. This leitmotif informs nearly all his writings, and also his political position with respect to the ruling clerical party—the Jesuits—and the court of Piedmont after the accession of Charles Albert in 1831.

Gioberti was noticed by the king and made one of his chaplains. His popularity and private influence were reasons enough for the court party to mark him for exile: he was not one of them, and could not be relied upon. Knowing this, he resigned his office in 1833, but was suddenly arrested on a charge of conspiracy. Shortly after, he was imprisoned for four months and was banished without a trial. Gioberti first went to Paris, and a year later, to Brussels where he remained until 1845. In Brussels, he taught philosophy and assisted a friend in the work of a private school. He found time to write many works of philosophical importance, with special reference to his country and its position.

In 1841, on the appearance of his book "Del Buono", the Grand Duke of Tuscany offered him a chair at the University of Pisa, but King Charles Albert objected, and the offer came to nothing. His fame in Italy dates from 1843 when he published his "Del primato morale e civile degli Italiani", which he dedicated to Silvio Pellico. Starting with the greatness of ancient Rome he traced history down through the splendours of the papacy, and recounting all that science and art owed to the genius of Italy, he declared that the Italian people were a model for all nations, and that their then insignificance was the result of their weakness politically, to remedy which he proposed a confederation of all the states of Italy with the pope as their head.

An amnesty was declared by Charles Albert in 1846, and Gioberti (who was again in Paris) was at liberty to return to Italy but refused to do so until the end of 1847. On his entrance into Turin on 29 April 1848 he was received with the greatest enthusiasm. He refused the dignity of senator offered him by Charles Albert, preferring to represent his native town in the Chamber of Deputies, of which he was soon elected president. At the close of the same year, a new ministry was formed, headed by Gioberti. With the accession of Victor Emmanuel in March 1849, his active life came to an end. For a short time, he held a seat in the cabinet, though without a portfolio. An irreconcilable disagreement soon followed, and his removal from Turin was accomplished by his appointment on a mission to Paris, whence he never returned. There, refusing the pension which had been offered him and all ecclesiastical preferment, he lived frugally, and spent his days and nights as at Brussels in literary labour. He died suddenly, of apoplexy, on 26 October 1852.

== Works and philosophy ==
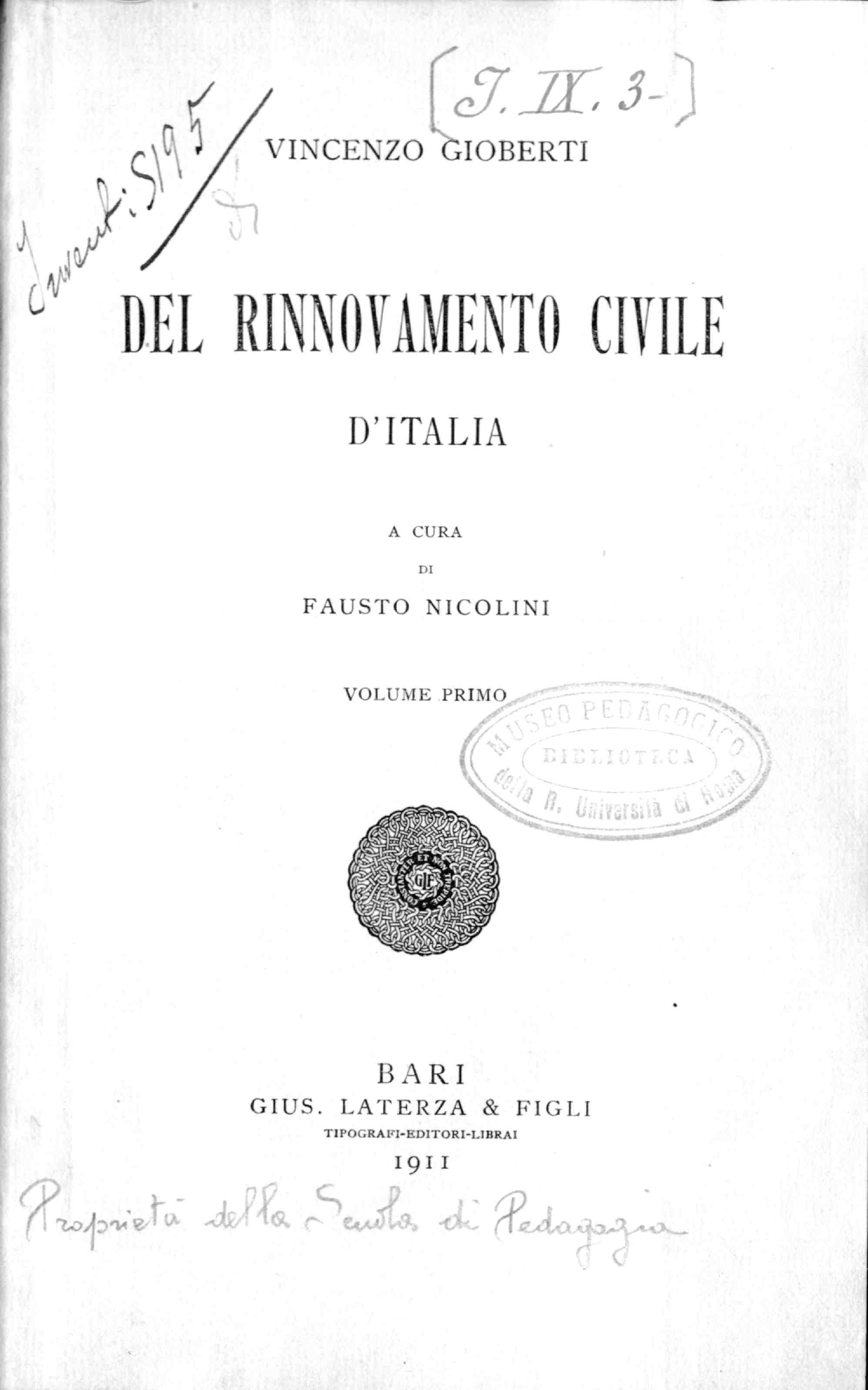
Del rinnovamento civile d'Italia, 1911

The following assessment is attributed to the Encyclopædia Britannica Eleventh Edition. Gioberti's writings are more important than his political career. In the general history of European philosophy, they stand apart. As the speculations of Rosmini-Serbati, against which he wrote, have been called the last link added to medieval thought, so the system of Gioberti, known as Ontologism, more especially in his greater and earlier works, is unrelated to other modern schools of thought. It shows a harmony with the Roman Catholic faith which caused Cousin to declare that Italian philosophy was still in the bonds of theology, and that Gioberti was no philosopher.

Method is with him a synthetic, subjective and psychological instrument. He reconstructs, as he declares, ontology, and begins with the ideal formula, the "Ens" creates ex nihilo the existent. God is the only being (Ens); all other things are merely existences. God is the origin of all human knowledge (called l'idee, thought), which is one and so to say identical with God himself. It is directly beheld (intuited) by reason, but in order to be of use it has to be reflected on, and this by means of language. A knowledge of being and existences (concrete, not abstract) and their mutual relations, is necessary at the beginning of philosophy.

Gioberti is in some respects a Platonist. He identifies religion with civilization, and in his treatise Del primato morale e civile degli italiani arrives at the conclusion that the church is the axis on which the well-being of human life revolves. In it, he affirms the idea of the supremacy of Italy, brought about by the restoration of the papacy as a moral dominion, founded on religion and public opinion. In his later works, the Rinnovamento and the Protologia, he is thought by some to have shifted his ground under the influence of events.

His first work, written when he was thirty-seven, had a personal reason for its existence. A young fellow-exile and friend, Paolo Pallia, having many doubts and misgivings as to the reality of revelation and future life, Gioberti at once set to work with La Teorica del sovrannaturale, which was his first publication (1838). After this, philosophical treatises followed in rapid succession. The Teorica was followed by Introduzione allo studio della filosofia in three volumes (1839–1840). In this work, he states his reasons for requiring a new method and new terminology. Here he brings out the doctrine that religion is the direct expression of the idea in this life, and is one with true civilization in history. Civilization is a conditioned mediate tendency to perfection, to which religion is the final completion if carried out; it is the end of the second cycle expressed by the second formula, the Ens redeems existences.

Essays (not published till 1846) on the lighter and more popular subjects, Del bello and Del buono, followed the Introduzione. Del primato morale e civile degli Italiani and the Prolegomeni to the same, and soon afterwards his triumphant exposure of the Jesuits, Il Gesuita moderno, no doubt hastened the transfer of rule from clerical to civil hands. It was the popularity of these semi-political works, increased by other occasional political articles, that caused Gioberti to be welcomed with such enthusiasm on his return to his native country. All these works were perfectly orthodox and aided in drawing the liberal clergy into the movement which has resulted since his time in the unification of Italy.

In the wake of the failure of the 1848 revolutions and the papacy's increasingly reactionary turn, Gioberti published Il Rinnovamento civile d’Italia, in which he bitterly attacked the Jesuits, Italy's reactionary clergy, and Piedmont's timid monarchy. Something of Gioberti's early optimism lived on among the liberal aristocrats and Catholic intellectuals such as Antonio Rosmini, Cesare Balbo, and Massimo d'Azeglio who afterwards turned to support the national aspirations of Piedmont's liberal monarchy.

The Jesuits, however, closed round the pope more firmly after his return to Rome, and in the end, Gioberti's writings were placed on the Index. The remainder of his works, especially La Filosofia della Rivelazione and Prolologia, give his mature views on many points.

== See also ==
- Giuseppe Mazzini
- Risorgimento

== Bibliography ==
- Rosmini, Antonio (1848). Vincenzo Gioberti e il panteismo. Milan.
- Smyth, Charles Bohun (1851). Christian Metaphysics. London: E. Palmer and son.
- Mauri, Achille (1853). Della vita e delle opere di Vincenzo Gioberti. Genoa: Grondona.
- Spaventa, Bertrando (1854). La Filosofia di Gioberti. Naples.
- Prisco, Giuseppe (1867). Gioberti e l'ontologismo. Naples: Accattoncelli.
- Luciani, Pietro (1866–1872). Gioberti e la filosofla nuova italiana. Naples: Guerrera.
- Berti, Domenico (1881). Di Vincenzo Gioberti riformatore politico e ministro. Florence.
- Gentile, Giovanni (1899). "Rosmini e Gioberti". Annali della R. Scuola Normale Superiore di Pisa. 13: I, III–XII, 1, 3–161, 163, 165–318. JSTOR 44867881.
- Haddock, Bruce (1998). "Political Union without Social Revolution: Vincenzo Gioberti's Primato". The Historical Journal. 41 (3): 705–723. JSTOR 2639900.

== See also ==
- Mariano, Raffaele (1866). La Philosophie contemporaine en Italie. Paris: Germer-Baillière.
- Ferri, Luigi (1869). L'Histoire de la philosophie en Italie au XIXe siècle. Paris: Durand.
- Werner, Karl (1885). Die italienische Philosophie des 19. Jahrhunderts. Vol. II. Vienna: Faesy.

Political offices
Preceded by None	President of the Italian Chamber of Deputies; 1848	Succeeded by Lorenzo Pareto
