= Massimo d'Azeglio =

Italian statesman, novelist, and painter (1798–1866)

Massimo d'Azeglio OSML, MOS, COS, LH
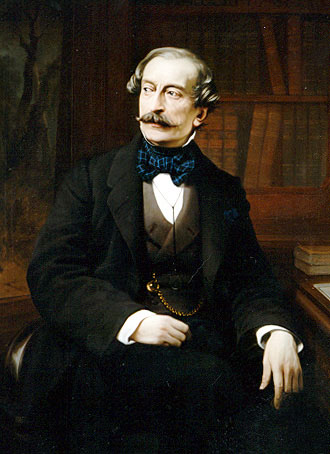
- Portrait of D'Azeglio by Francesco Gonin, 1850

Senator of the Kingdom of Italy
- In office 20 October 1853 – 15 January 1866
- Monarch: Victor Emmanuel II

Prime Minister of Sardinia
- In office 7 May 1849 – 4 November 1852
- Monarch: Victor Emmanuel II
- Preceded by: Claudio Gabriele de Launay
- Succeeded by: The Count of Cavour

Member of the Chamber of Deputies of the Kingdom of Sardinia
- In office 8 May 1848 – 20 October 1853
- Constituency: Strambino

Personal details
- Born: 24 October 1798 Turin, Kingdom of Sardinia
- Died: 15 January 1866 (aged 67) Turin, Italy
- Party: Historical Right
- Spouse: Giulia Claudia Manzoni (m. 1831; died 1834)
- Children: Alessandra Taparelli
- Parent(s): Cesare Taparelli and Cristina Morozzo
- Education: University of Turin
- Profession: Soldier, writer, painter
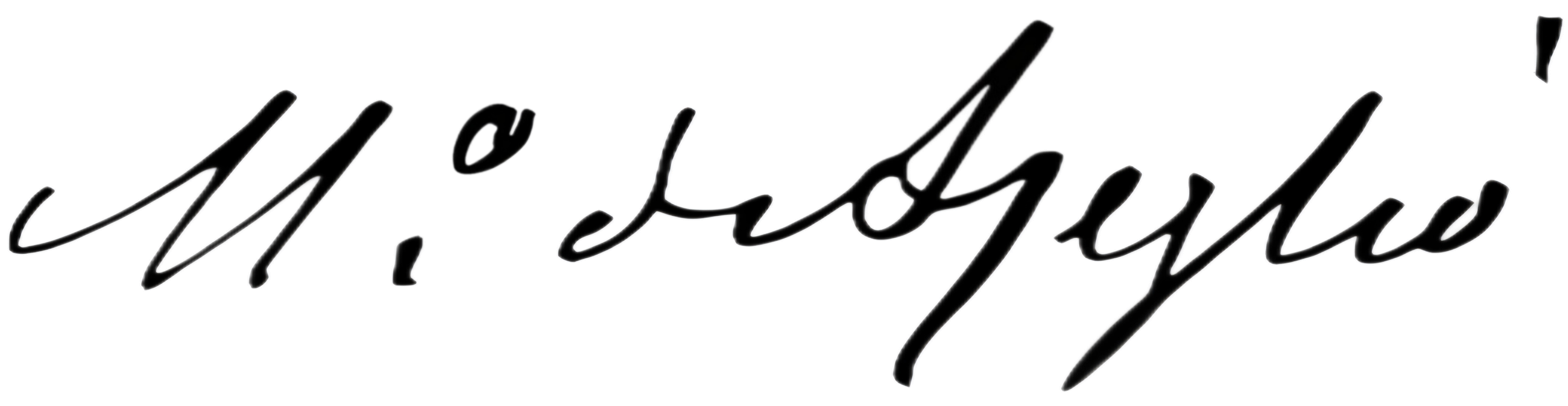
- Signature

Military service
- Branch/service: Royal Sardinian Army
- Years of service: 1815; 1848–1849
- Rank: Colonel
- Unit: 2nd Cavalry Regiment
- Battles/wars: First Italian War of Independence

Massimo Taparelli, Marquess of Azeglio (24 October 1798 – 15 January 1866), commonly called Massimo d'Azeglio (Italian: [ˈmassimo tapaˈrɛlli dadˈdzeʎʎo]), was a Piedmontese-Italian statesman, novelist, and painter. He was Prime Minister of Sardinia for almost three years until succeeded by his rival Camillo Benso, Count of Cavour. A moderate liberal and member of the Moderate Party associated with the Historical Right, d'Azeglio hoped for a federal union between Italian states.

As Prime Minister, d'Azeglio consolidated the parliamentary system, getting the young King Victor Emmanuel II to accept his constitutional status, and worked hard for a peace treaty with Austria. Although himself a Roman Catholic, he introduced freedom of worship, supported public education, and sought to reduce the power of the clergy in local political affairs. As a senator, following the annexation of the United Provinces of Central Italy, d'Azeglio attempted to solve the Roman Question through reconciliation between the Vatican and the new Italian Kingdom. His brother was Luigi Taparelli – Jesuit priest.

== Early life ==
Massimo Taparelli, Marquis d'Azeglio, was born in Turin on 24 October 1798. He was descended from an ancient and noble Piedmontese family. His father, Cesare d'Azeglio, an officer in the Royal Sardinian Army, held a high position at court. On the return of Pope Pius VII to Rome after the abdication of Napoleon, Cesare was sent as special envoy to the Holy See and took his son, then sixteen years of age, with him as an extra attaché. Young Massimo was given a commission in a cavalry regiment, which he soon relinquished on account of his health. During his residence in Rome, Massimo acquired a love for art and music and decided to become a painter, to the horror of his conservative, aristocratic family. His father reluctantly consented, and Massimo settled in Rome, devoting himself to art.

== Early political career ==
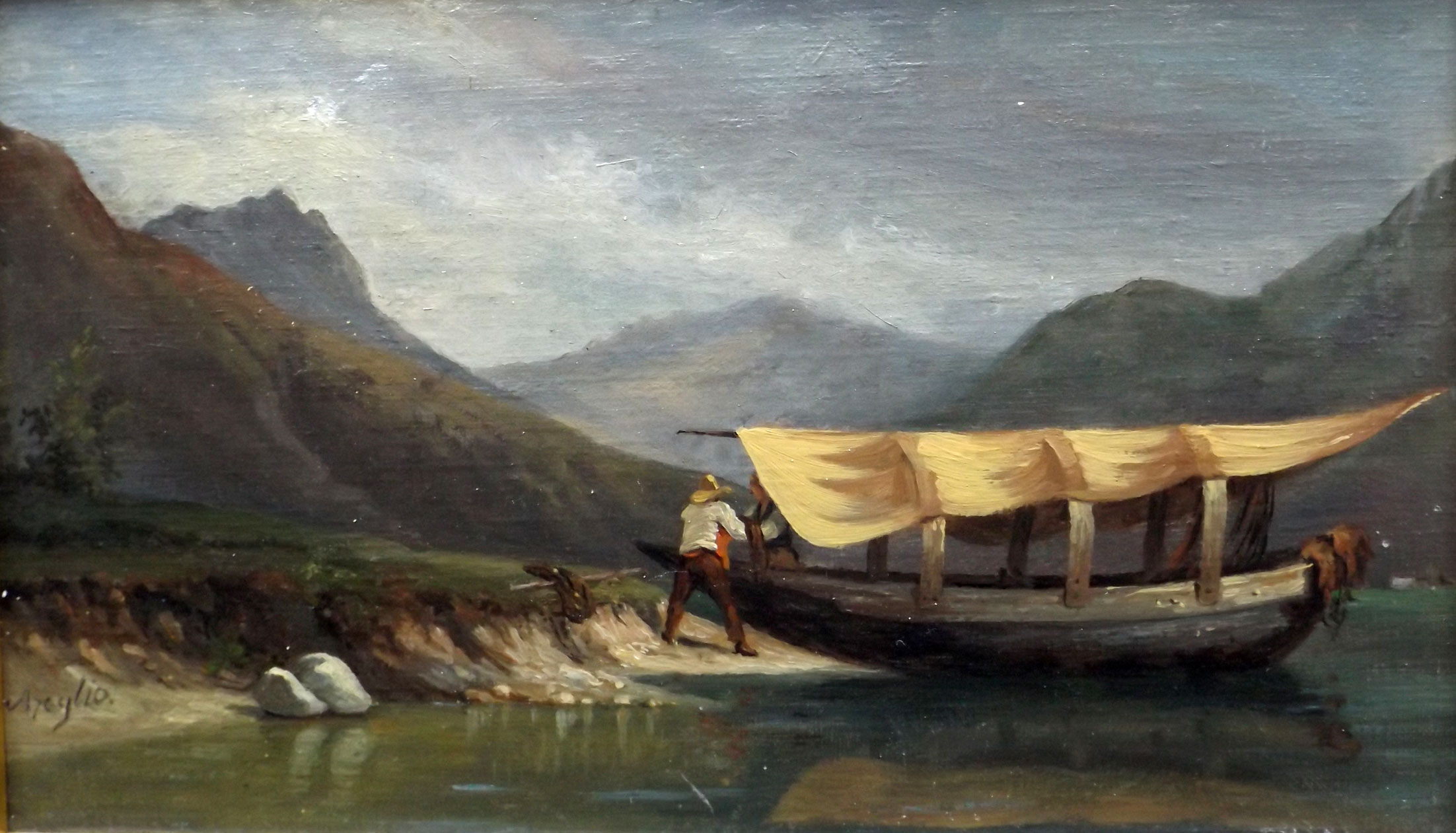
D'Azeglio in Life on the Lake with a Boat

He led an abstemious life in Rome, maintaining himself by painting Romantic landscapes which frequently included historical subjects. He also painted scenes for a self-composed opera. In 1830 he returned to Turin and, after his father's death in 1831, moved to Milan. He resided in Milan for twelve years, moving in the city's literary and artistic circles and, in 1834, helped to organise the Salotto Maffei salon, hosted by Clara Maffei. He became an intimate of Alessandro Manzoni the novelist, whose daughter he married. At that point, literature instead of art became his chief occupation; he produced two historical novels, Niccolò dei Lapi and Ettore Fieramosca, in imitation of Walter Scott. The novels had a strong political context, with d'Azeglio aiming to illustrate the evils of foreign domination in Italy and to reawaken national feeling.

In 1845, d'Azeglio visited Romagna as an unauthorized political envoy, to report on its conditions and the troubles which he foresaw would break out on the death of Pope Gregory XVI. The following year he published his famous pamphlet Degli ultimi casi di Romagna at Florence; as a consequence of this he was expelled from Tuscany. He spent the next few months in Rome, sharing the general enthusiasm over the supposed liberalism of the new pope, Pius IX; like Vincenzo Gioberti he believed in an Italian confederation under papal auspices and was opposed to the Radical wing of the Liberal party. His political activity increased and he wrote various other pamphlets, among which was I lutti di Lombardia (1848).

On the outbreak of the First Italian War of Independence, d'Azeglio donned the Papal uniform and took part under General Giovanni Durando in the defence of Vicenza, where he was severely wounded. He retired to Florence to recover, but as he opposed the ruling democrats he was expelled from Tuscany a second time. He was now a famous man, and early in 1849 King Charles Albert of Sardinia, invited him to form a cabinet. Realizing how impossible it was to renew the campaign, but "not having the heart to sign, in such wretched internal and external conditions, a treaty of peace with Austria" (Correspondance politique, by E Rendu), he refused.

== Prime Minister of Sardinia ==
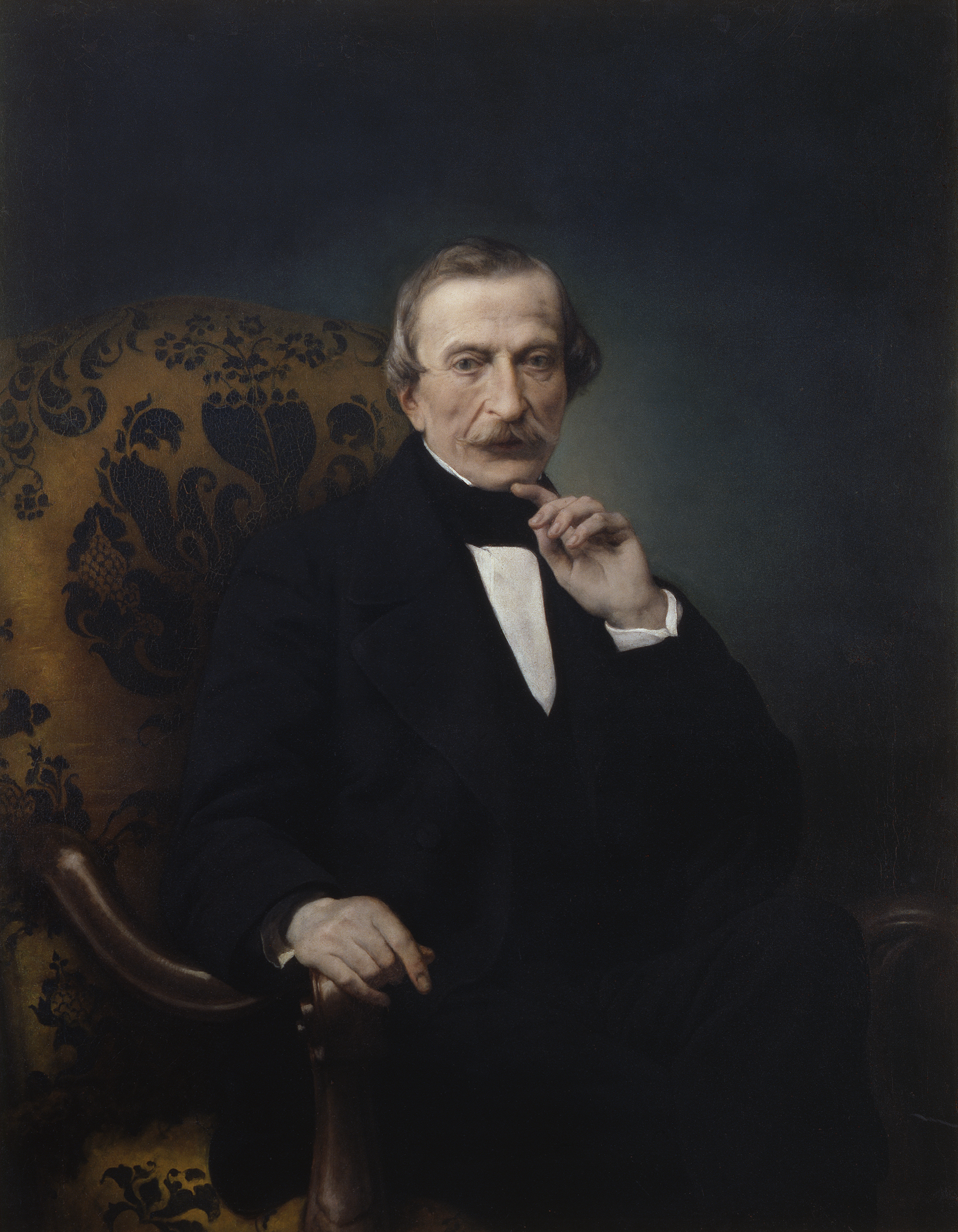
Portrait of Massimo d'Azeglio by Francesco Hayez, (1864)

After the defeat at the Battle of Novara (23 March 1849), Charles Albert abdicated and was succeeded by Victor Emmanuel II. D'Azeglio was again called on to form a cabinet; this time, although the situation was even more difficult, he accepted, concluded a peace treaty, dissolved the Chamber and summoned a new one to ratify it. The treaty was accepted and d'Azeglio continued in office for the next three years. While all the rest of Italy was prey to despotism, in Piedmont, the king maintained the constitution intact in the face of a general wave of reaction. D'Azeglio conducted the country's affairs with tact and ability, and improved its diplomatic relations. With his top aide Cavour taking the lead legislation passed weakening the powers of the Church to own land, control the schools and supervise marriage laws. When the bishops protested they were punished or exiled, inspiring liberal anticlerical elements across Italy.

D'Azeglio invited Camillo Benso, Count of Cavour, then a rising young politician, to enter the ministry in 1850. Cavour and Luigi Carlo Farini, also a member of the cabinet, made certain declarations in the Chamber (May 1852) which led the ministry in the direction of an alliance with Urbano Rattazzi and the Left. D'Azeglio disapproved of this and resigned office, but on the king's request formed a new ministry, excluding both Cavour and Farini. In October, however, owing to ill health and dissatisfaction with some of his colleagues, and for other reasons not quite clear, he resigned once more and retired, suggesting to the king that Cavour should be his successor.

== Retirement ==
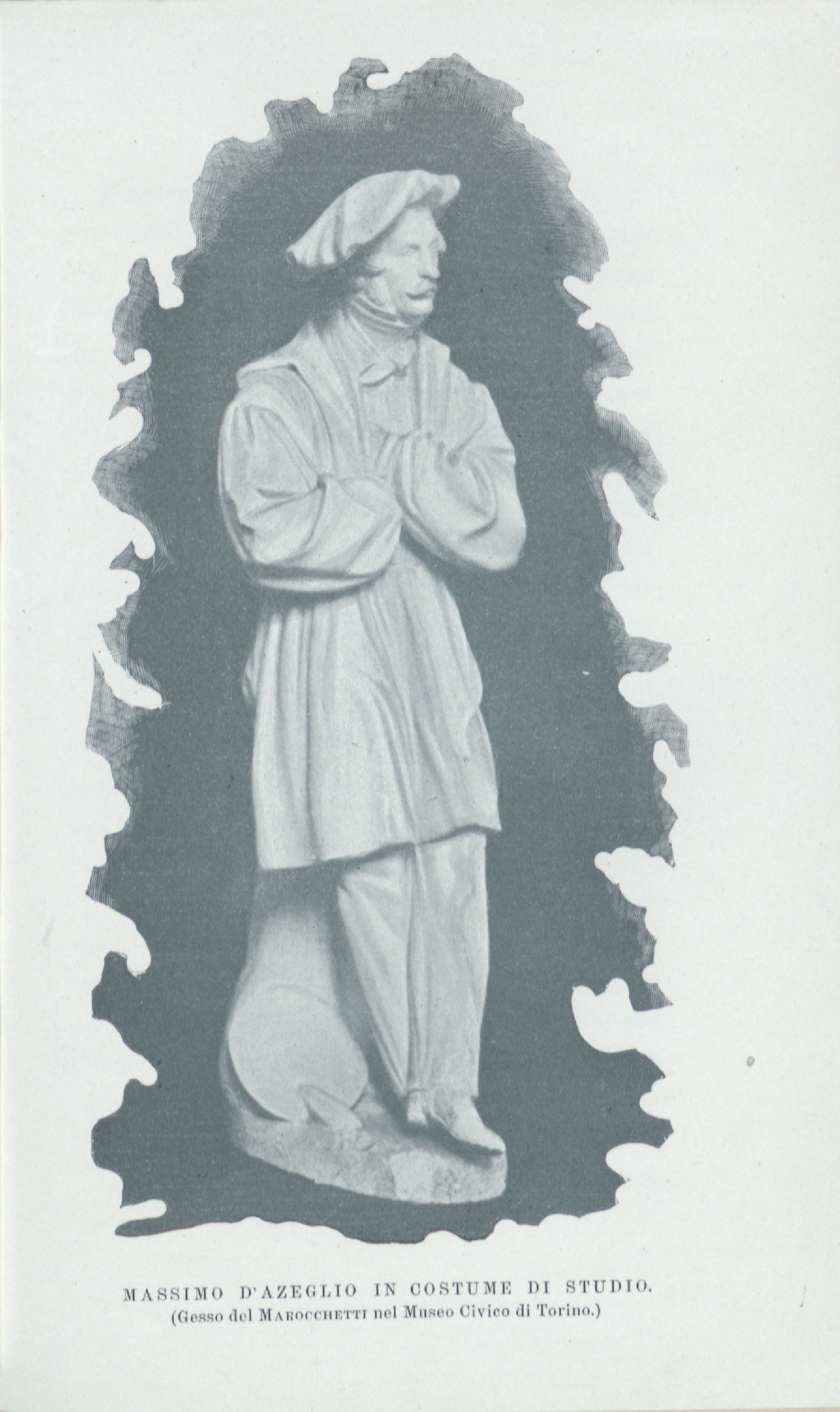
D'Azeglio at Museo Civico di Torino

For the next four years he lived modestly at Turin, devoting himself once more to art, although he also continued to take an active interest in politics. Cavour continued to consult him. In 1855 d'Azeglio was appointed director of the Galleria Sabauda. In 1859 he was given various political missions, including one to Paris and London to prepare the basis for a general congress of the powers on Italian affairs. When war between Piedmont and Austria appeared inevitable, he returned to Italy and was sent by Cavour as royal commissioner to Romagna, whence the papal troops had been expelled.

After the Armistice of Villafranca, d'Azeglio was recalled with orders to withdraw the Piedmontese garrisons, but saw the danger of allowing papal troops to reoccupy the province, and after a severe struggle left Bologna without the troops and interviewed the king. The latter approved of his action and said that his orders had not been accurately expressed; thus Romagna was saved. That same year d'Azeglio published a pamphlet in French entitled De la Politique et du droit chrétien au point de vue de la question italienne, with the object of inducing Napoleon III to continue his pro-Italian policy. Early in 1860, Cavour appointed him governor of Milan, evacuated by the Austrians after the Battle of Magenta, a position which he held with great ability. However, disapproving of the government's policy with regard to Garibaldi's Expedition of the Thousand and regarding the occupation by Piedmont of the Kingdom of the Two Sicilies as inopportune, he resigned office.

The deaths of his two brothers in 1862 and of Cavour in 1861 caused d'Azeglio great grief; he subsequently led a comparatively retired life, but continued to take part in politics, both as deputy and writer, his two chief subjects of interest being the Roman question and the relations of Piedmont (now the Kingdom of Italy) with Mazzini and the other revolutionaries. In his opinion Italy needed to be unified using the Franco-Piedmontese army alone, avoiding any connection with the other armies. He continued to hold that the pope should enjoy nominal sovereignty over Rome with full spiritual independence, with the capital of Italy being established elsewhere but the Romans being Italian citizens. He strongly disapproved of the September Convention of 1864 between the Italian government and the pope. The last few years of d'Azeglio's life were spent chiefly at his villa of Cannero, where he wrote his memoirs. He died of fever in Turin on 15 January 1866.

== Role as politician ==
D'Azeglio played a significant role in the rehabilitation of Piedmont after the chaos of the 1848–49 revolutions. He had a low opinion of the people of Italy, who, he declared "were 20 per cent stupid rascally and bold, 80 per cent stupid, honest and timid, and such a people has the government it deserves." He became Prime Minister in 1849, despite a lack of experience or enthusiasm. Bored by debates in Parliament, he had unexpected strengths. He was honest and clear-sighted, widely admired both at home and abroad, displaying wisdom and moderation that were crucial for consolidating the parliamentary system in his kingdom. He convinced the king to accept constitutional government, with the proviso the King could control military and foreign policy without parliamentary interference.

== Writings and publications ==
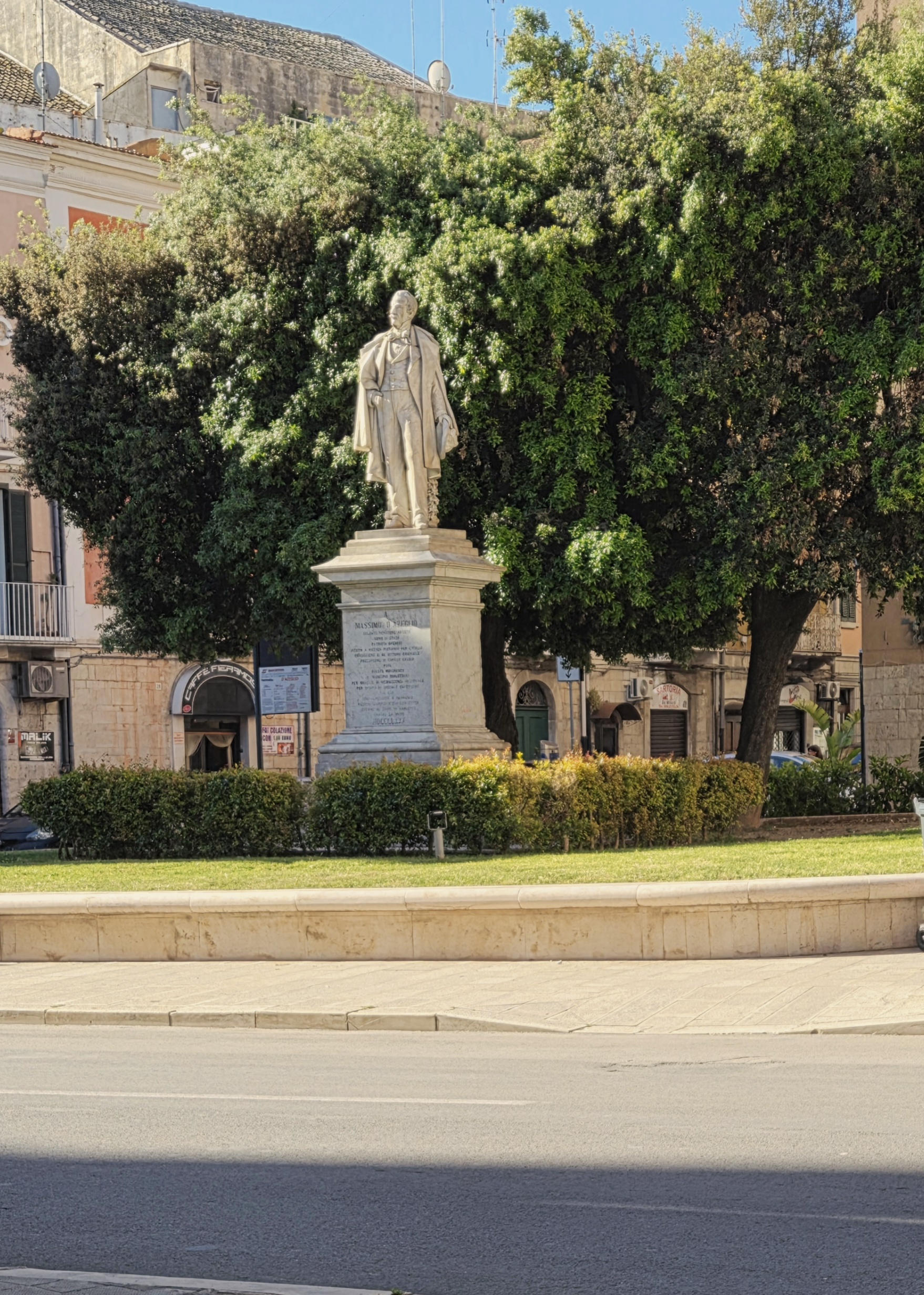
D'Azeglio monument at Barletta, the City of the Challenge

Besides a variety of newspaper articles and pamphlets, d'Azeglio's chief works are the two novels Ettore Fieramosca (1833) and Niccolò dei Lapi (1841), as well as a volume of autobiographical memoirs entitled I Miei Ricordi (D'Azeglio Memoirs – p. 1867), a work published after his death, in 1866, but unfortunately incomplete. A quote from his memoirs is "L'Italia è fatta. Restano da fare gli italiani", translated colloquially as "We have made Italy. Now we must make Italians." His landscape paintings influenced Salvatore Mazza and Luigi Riccardi.

== Memory ==
A prestigious Liceo classico founded in 1831 in his hometown of Turin was later renamed in his honour. The Liceo classico Massimo d'Azeglio has a notable place in Italian history as the alma mater of author Primo Levi, novelist Cesare Pavese, screenwriter Tullio Pinelli, and anti-fascist intellectuals such as publisher Giulio Einaudi (son of future President Luigi Einaudi), Norberto Bobbio, and writer and teacher Leone Ginzburg. Juventus Football Club was founded by its students in 1897. There is a poetry contest organized by a cultural organization in Puglia (Italian region) named after D'Azeglio.

== Honours ==
- Grand Cordon of the Order of Leopold, 1851.
- Knight Grand Cross of the Order of Saints Maurice and Lazarus.

== Gallery ==
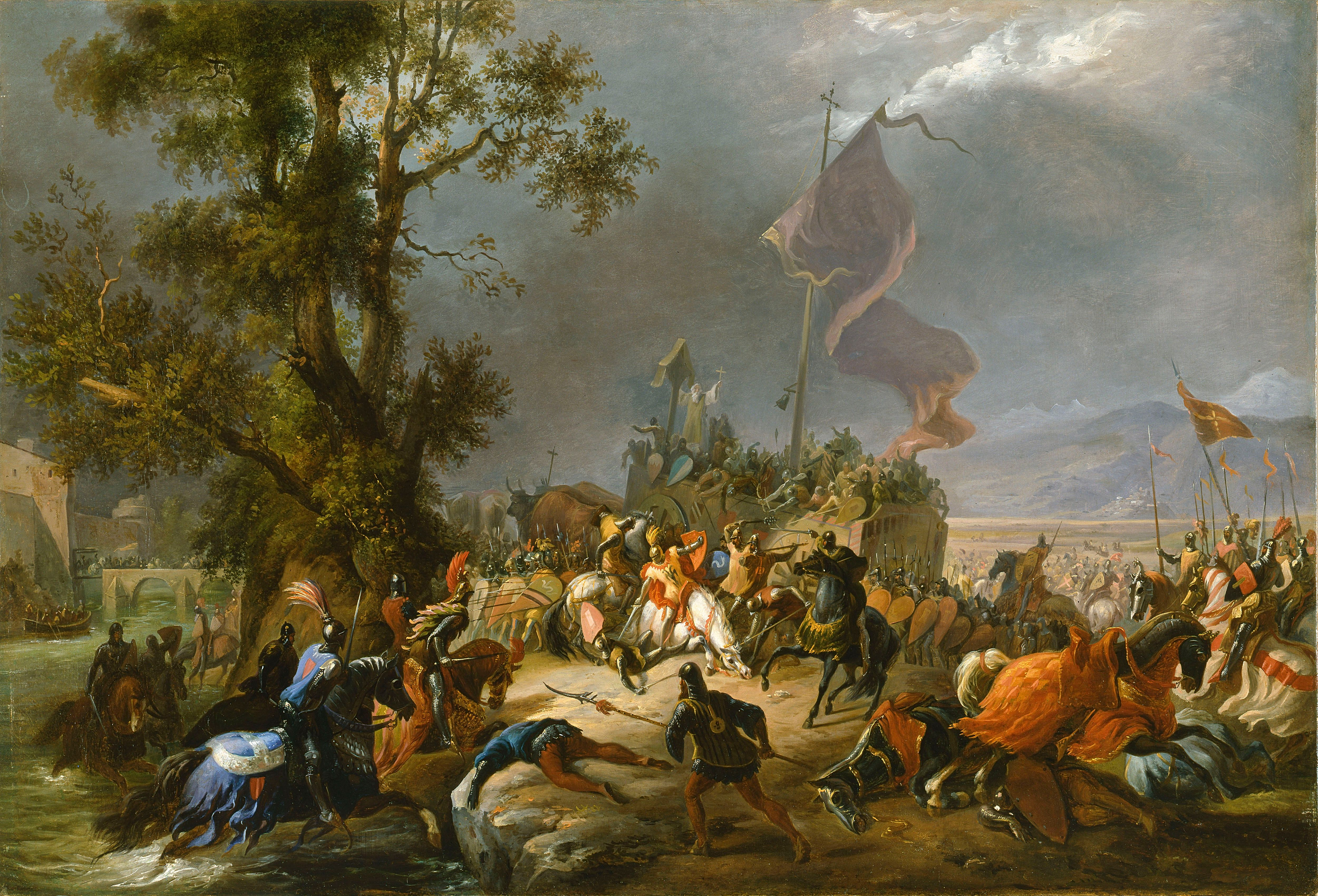
The Battle of Legnano, 1831

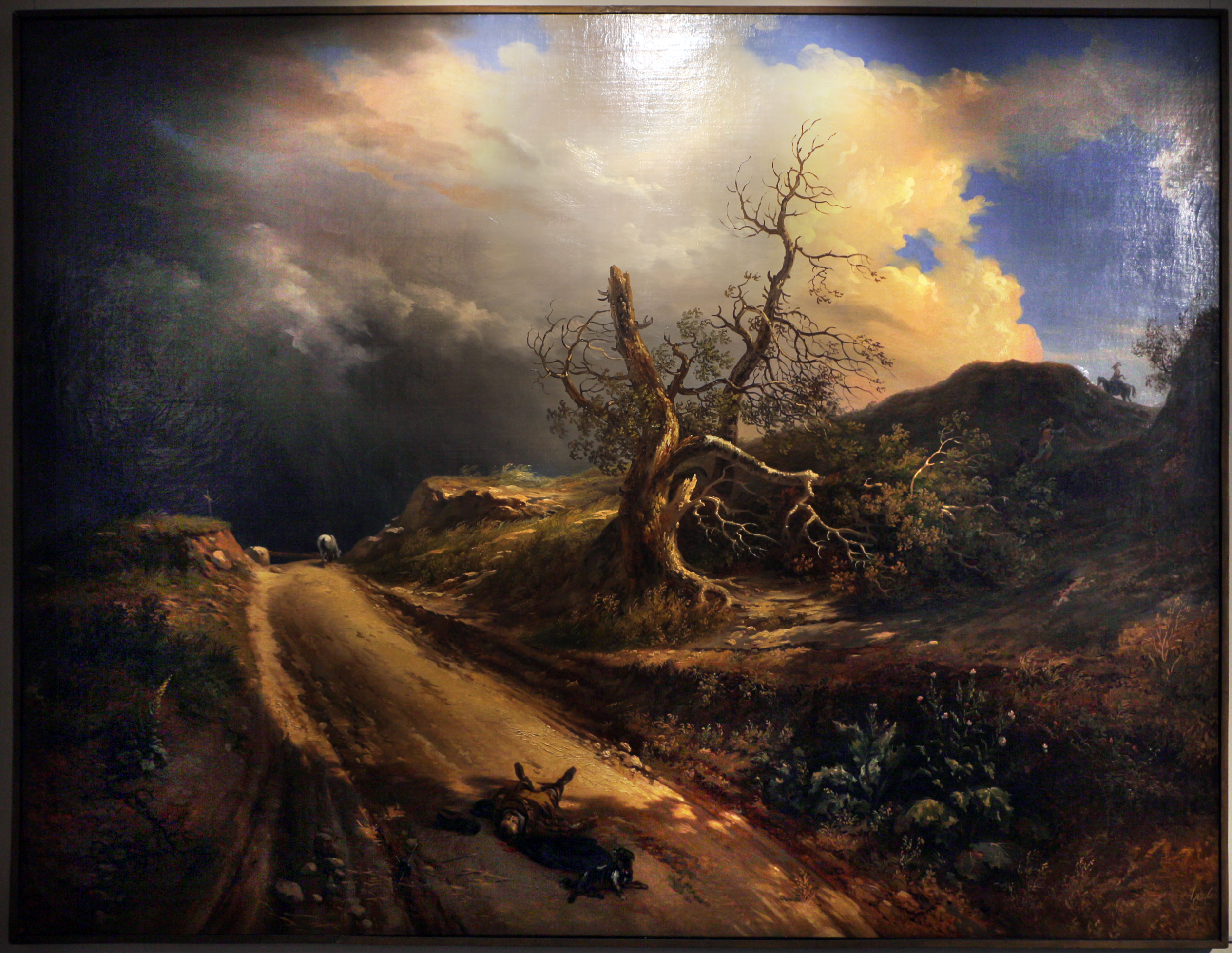
Una Vendetta, 1835

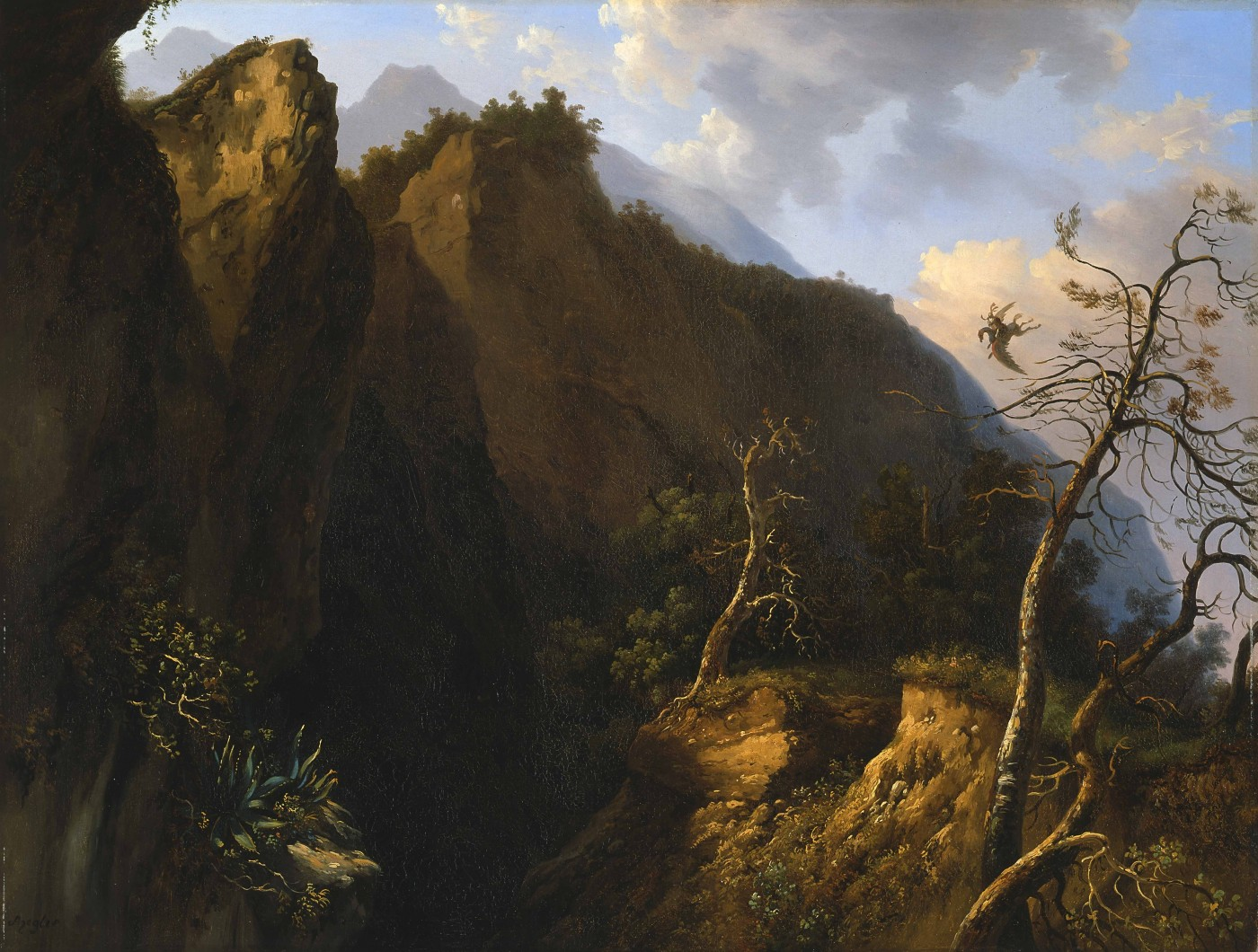
Astolfo debella le arpie, 1835

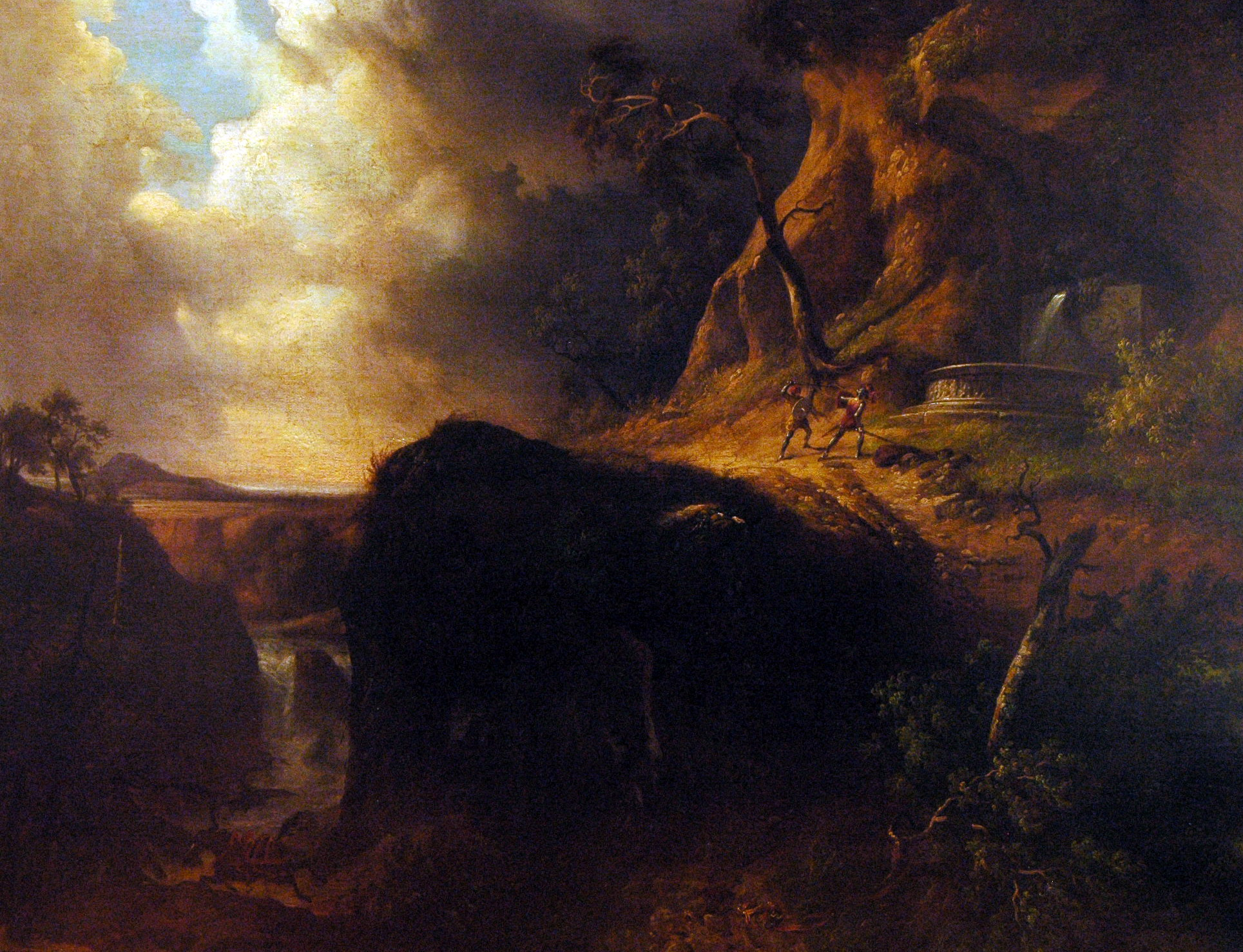
Combattimento di Rinaldo e Gradasso, 1839

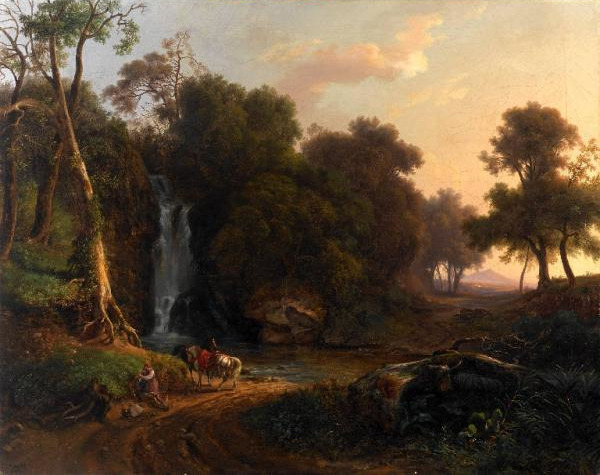
The Death of Zerbino, 1839

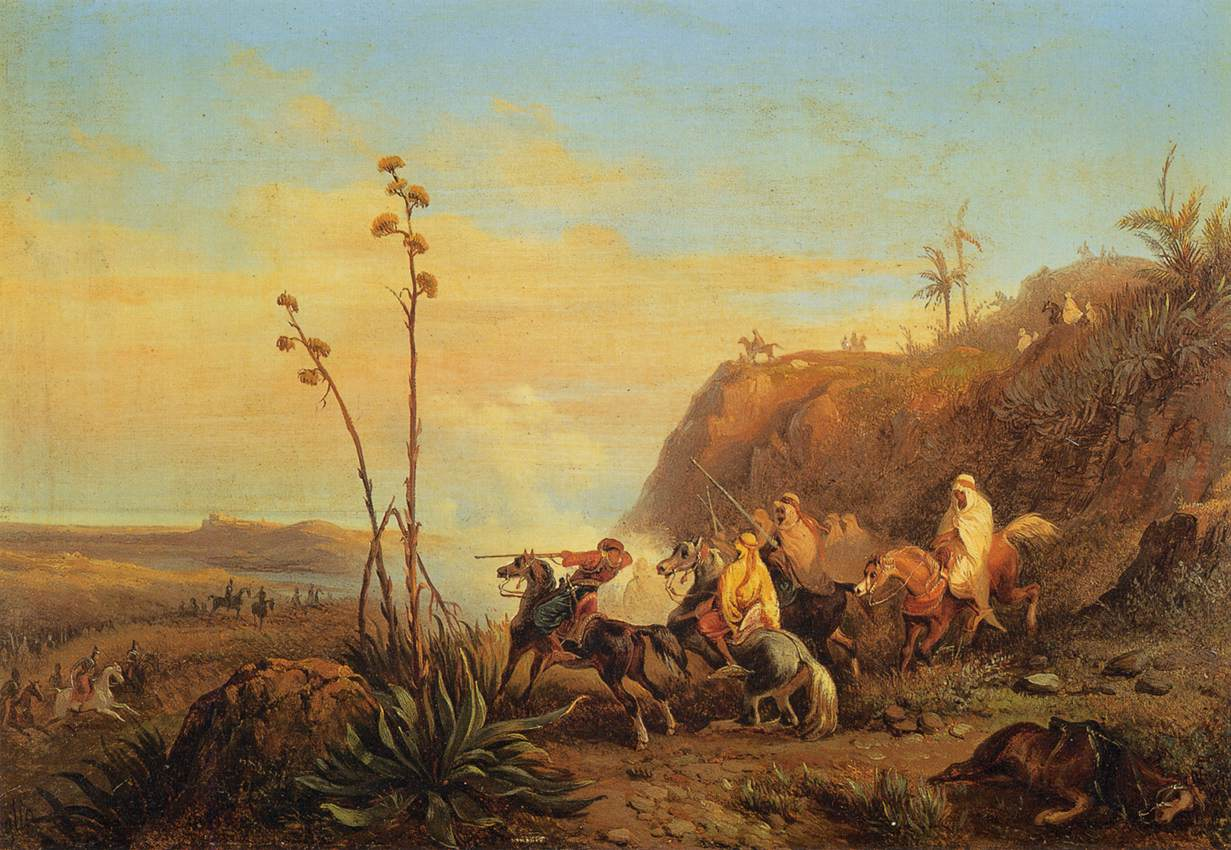
Arabs on Horseback, 1840

== See also ==
- List of Prime Ministers of the Kingdom of Sardinia
- Luigi Taparelli (1793–1862), his brother, an Italian Jesuit scholar who coined the term social justice
