= Agostino Chiodo =

Italian politician

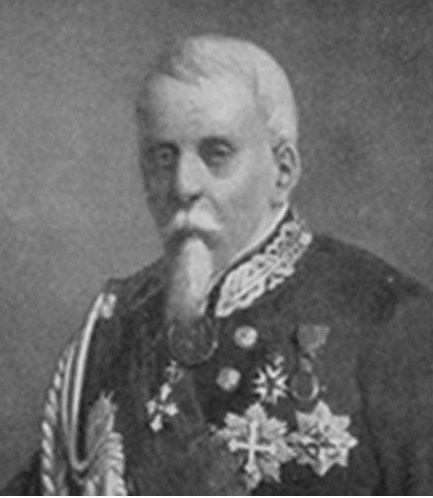
Agostino Chiodo Portrait

Agostino Chiodo (16 April 1791 – 25 February 1861) was an Italian military officer who served as Prime Minister of the Kingdom of Sardinia from 21 February to 27 March 1849.
