= Taparelli =

Taparelli is an Italian surname that may refer to:

- Aimone Taparelli (died 1495), Italian priest and friar
- Cesare Taparelli d'Azeglio (1763–1830), Italian writer
- Roberto Taparelli d'Azeglio (1790–1862), Italian painter
- Luigi Taparelli d'Azeglio (1793–1862), Italian political theorist
- Massimo Taparelli d'Azeglio (1798–1866), Italian statesman, novelist and painter
- Vittorio Emanuele Taparelli d'Azeglio (1816–1890), Italian diplomat

== See also ==
- Tavarelli, a surname
