= D'Azeglio =

D'Azeglio is an Italian surname that may refer to:

- Cesare Taparelli d'Azeglio (1763–1830), Italian writer
- Roberto d'Azeglio (1790–1862), Italian painter
- Luigi Taparelli d'Azeglio (1793–1862), Italian political theorist
- Massimo d'Azeglio (1798–1866), Italian statesman, novelist and painter
- Vittorio Emanuele Taparelli d'Azeglio (1816–1890), Italian diplomat

== See also ==
- Azeglio
- Azeglio (name)
- Liceo Classico Massimo d'Azeglio, a high school in Turin, Italy
