= Edward Dering =

Edward Dering may refer to:

- Edward Dering (priest) (c. 1540–1576), Church of England priest and evangelical preacher
- Sir Edward Dering, 1st Baronet (1598–1644), English Member of Parliament for Hythe and Kent
- Sir Edward Dering, 2nd Baronet (1625–1684), English Member of Parliament for Kent, East Retford and Hythe
- Sir Edward Dering, 3rd Baronet (1650–1689), English Member of Parliament for Kent
- Sir Edward Dering, 5th Baronet (1705–1762), British Member of Parliament for Kent
- Sir Edward Dering, 6th Baronet (1732–1798), British Member of Parliament for New Romney
- Sir Edward Dering, 8th Baronet (1807–1896), British Member of Parliament for Wexford, New Romney and Kent East
- Edward Heneage Dering (1826–1892), English novelist
