= Rebecca Dulcibella Orpen =

British painter (1829 or 1830–1923)

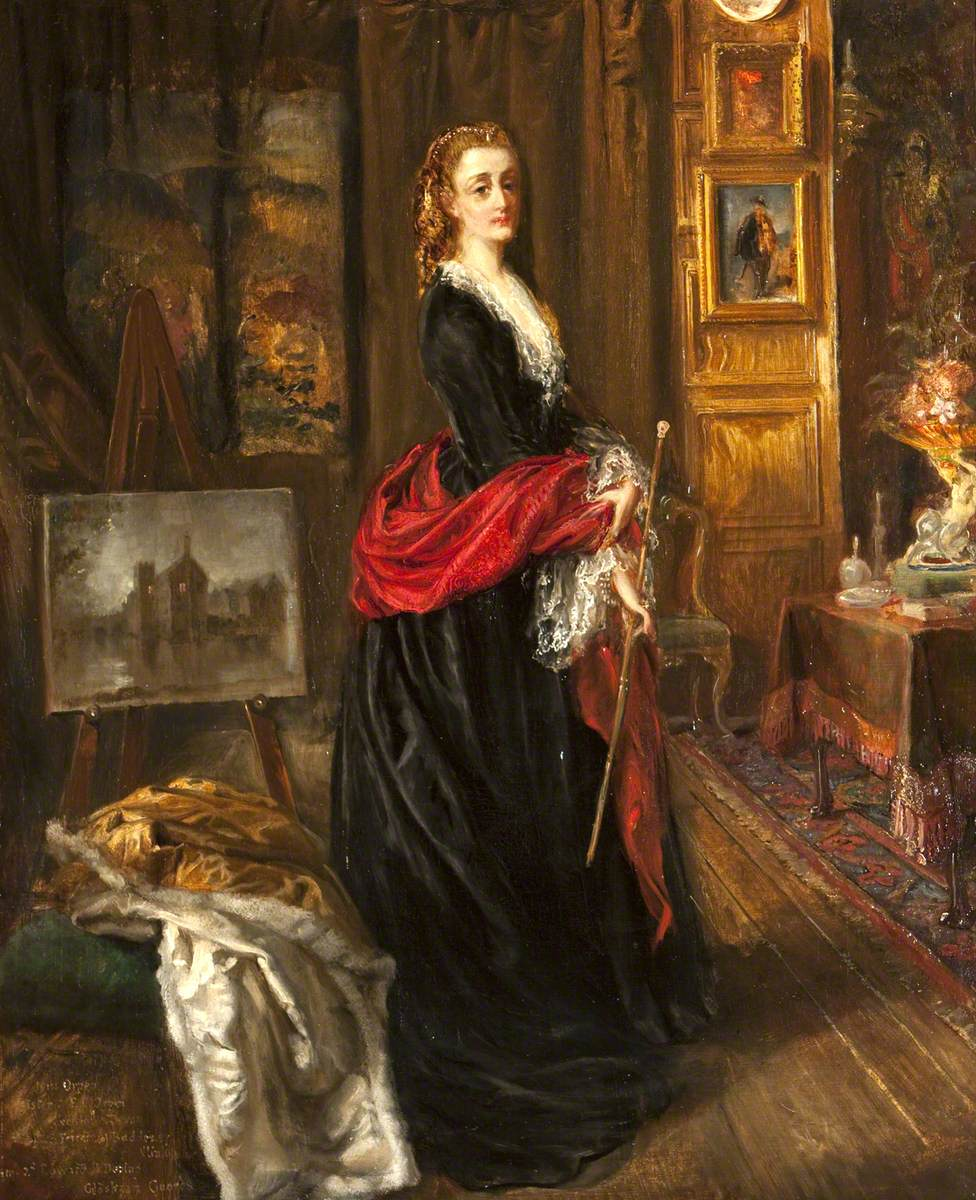
- Self Portrait in the Painting Room at Baddesley Clinton, 1885, by Rebecca Orpen
- Born: 1829 or 1830
- Died: 12 September 1923
- Spouse(s): Marmion Edward Ferrers (1867-1884); Edward Heneage Dering (1885-1892)
- Relatives: Georgiana Chatterton

Rebecca Dulcibella Orpen (1830?-1923) was a 19th-century artist. As she married twice, she is occasionally referred to as Rebecca Dulcibella Orpen Ferrers, Mrs Edward Henege Dering, or Rebecca Dering.

== Life ==
Rebecca Dulcibella Orpen was born either in 1829 or 1830, the historical record is murky as to which, in County Cork, Ireland. She was the daughter of Abraham Edward Orpen and Martha Chatterton. She appears to have spent much of her youth with her aunt, Lady Georgiana Chatterton and her husband, Sir William Chatterton, and may have eventually gone to live with them.

Orpen was schooled in London, where she would have studied art and literature. Furthermore, her aunt's diaries suggest that Orpen was taught French by a governess in Paris and also knew German.

In 1859, Lady Georgiana married Edward Heneage Dering. It has been suggested that Dering was actually intending to propose to Rebecca but, as a result of a misunderstanding, came to be engaged to Lady Georgiana, who was much older than him. However, that story does not appear to have strong historical substantiation. After the pair wed, Orpen and the couple travelled Europe, sketching and drawing as they went. A great many pieces Rebecca produced during this time are held by the National Trust.

At the age of 37, on 18 July 1867, Rebecca Dulcibella Orpen married Marmion Edward Ferrers of Baddesley Clinton. Two years later, Lady Georgiana and her husband, Edward Heneage Dering, moved in with Rebecca and Marmion at Baddesley Clinton. The foursome, who became known as The Quartet, immersed themselves in the arts and in the restoration of Baddesley Clinton. Their other interests also included novel-writing, music, poetry, and embroidery.

The Quartet were also Catholics, a not-uncommon feature of Baddesley Clinton. The Ferrers family that held the estate had historically been Catholics, and the estate had even been used to shelter Catholics when their presence in England was not legal. The diary of John Henry Newman suggests that Edward Dering, Lady Georgiana, and Rebecca Orpen were received into the Church of Rome in 1865. The Quartet were responsible for the addition of a chapel to the house's first floor, Rebecca providing paintings for it. (In the 1940s, Undine Ferrers, the wife of a distant relative of Marmion, ripped out the shrubbery had added the house, apparently feeling that the dark foliage represented "the dark forces of Catholicism.")

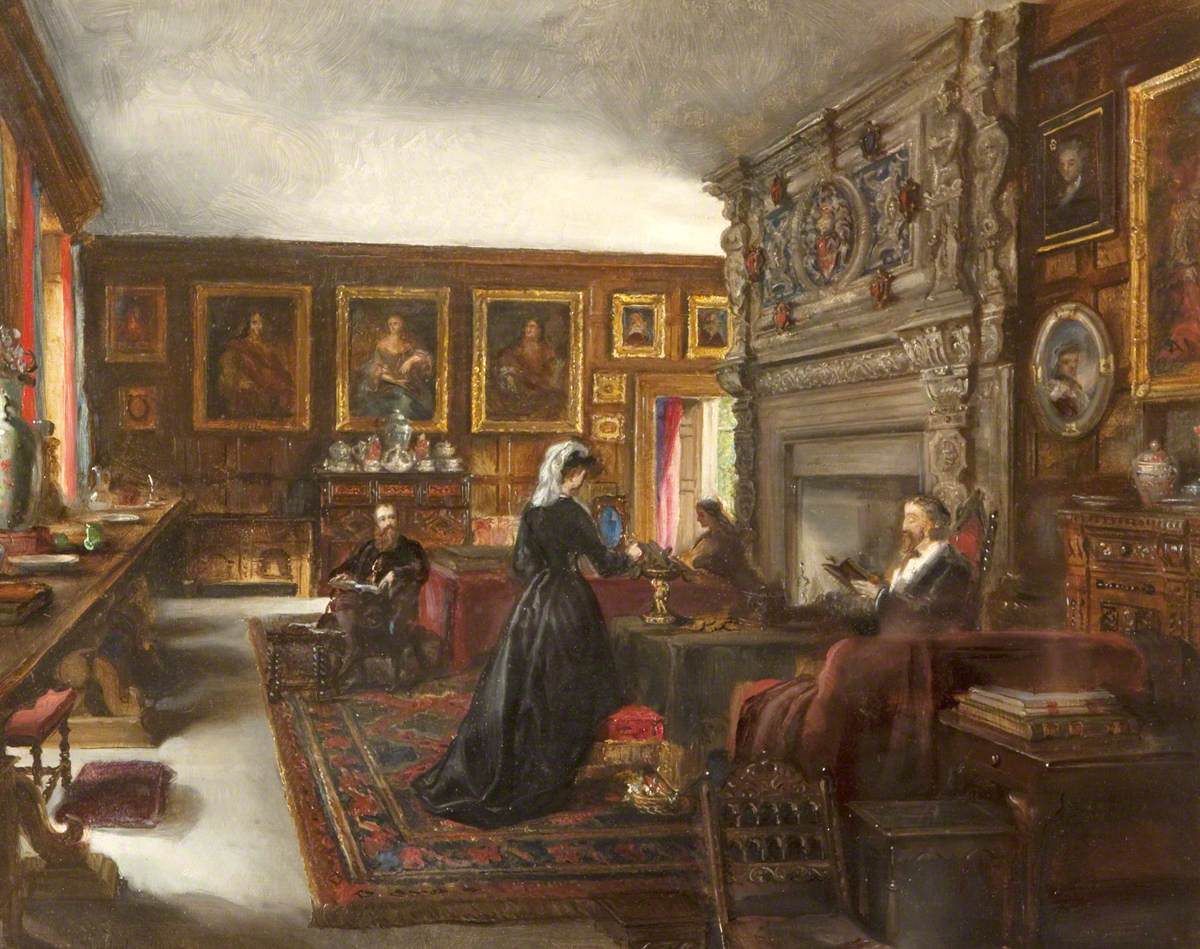
The Great Hall, Baddesley Clinton, with Mr and Mrs Marmion Ferrers, Edward Heneage Dering and Lady Chatterton (Mrs Dering) by Rebecca Dulcibella Orpen (1870)

After the foursome had lived together for seven years, Lady Georgiana died in 1876. She left Rebecca money in trust. In 1884, Marmion died as well. He left his wife everything that he owned, including the tenancy on Baddesley Clinton until she died. Rebecca Orpen and Edward Dering, the surviving members of the foursome, remained together at Baddesley Clinton; however, because it was not socially acceptable for an unmarried man and woman to live together alone, a local priest came to stay with them for 13 months. 21 September 1885, the two surviving members of the Quartet married.

Her second husband died 22 November 1892. After his death, she continued her painting and involvement in local affairs, and she remained a staunch Catholic. She may have had old-fashioned sensibilities in some regards. For example, she "steadfastly maintained what Country Life described as “the regime of mid-Victorian England modified by the wistful love of Elizabethan manners” and she declined to have electricity installed in the house. According to an account left by her last servant, "There was no electric light or lamps, only candles, rather trying in the winter, but we got used to it and managed quite well, but at times it was quite scary." (Her objections to innovations did not, it seems, extend to rejecting photography.)

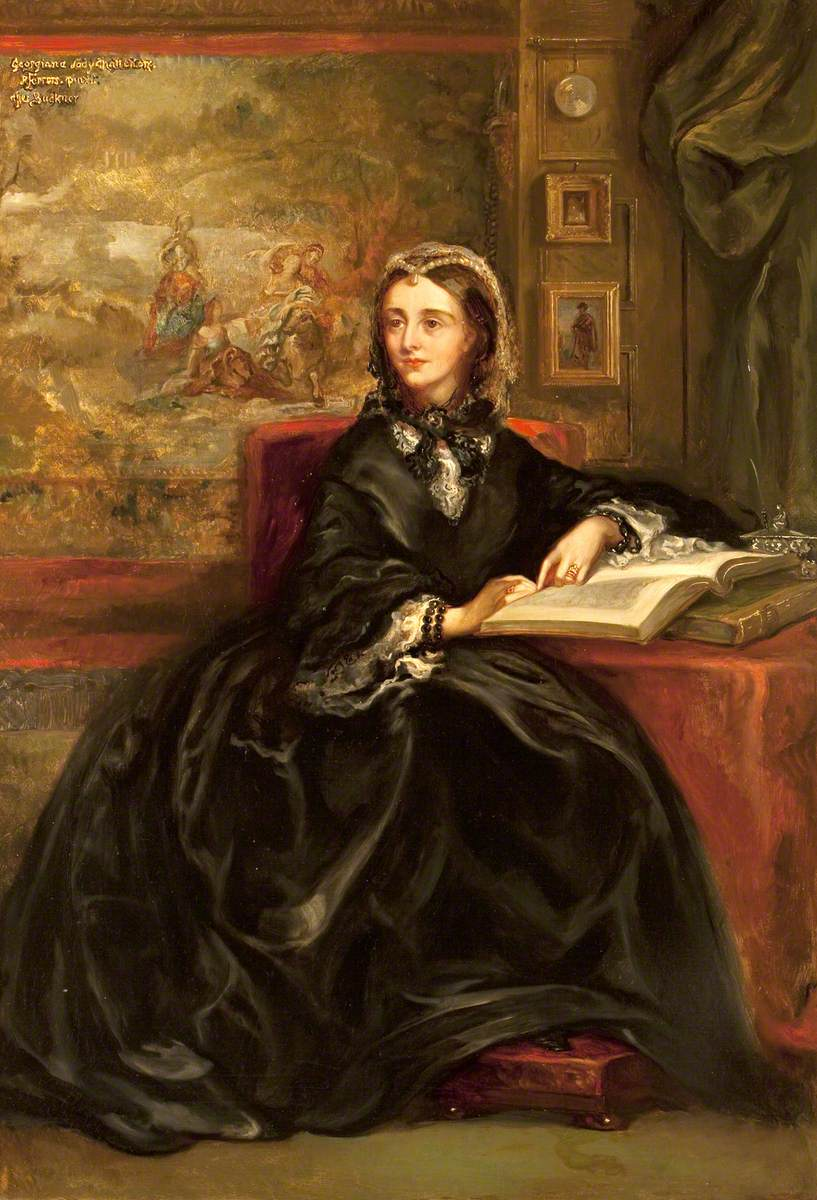
Henrietta Georgiana Marcia Lascelles Iremonger (1806–1876), Lady Chatterton (Mrs Edward Heneage Dering) (after Richard Buckner) by Rebecca Dulcibella Orpen (c. 1859)

Rebecca Orpen was not a supporter of the suffrage movement. In a letter to Miss Mary Grafton from 1907, the year of the Mud March, Rebecca wrote "Don’t please encourage women[‘s] suffrage! Think what it would be for poor old me!" Unlike some in the period, she did not take a moral objection to suffrage. Instead, she seems to have regarded extending suffrage in the UK as impractical: "I drive to the Poll with a lot of rough people + force my way with the crowd. As it is the carriage has to go all day carrying my tenants as voters to the poll, + if women also, where would end the fatigue and bother. This is a low view to take I know, but one has to consider how things work in practise." She seems to have contented herself instead with soft power, influencing local politics by guiding the votes of 'her people,' for she tells Miss Grafton, "I got all my people to vote right + secured the thanks of the member Sir A Muntz," who was the local MP.

Rebecca remained at Baddesley Clinton until her own death, 31 years later on 12 September 1923.

== Art ==
She was a prolific artist, working in both oil paints and watercolor. 78 of Rebecca Orpen's paintings are known to still survive. She also made sketchbooks full of sketches and preparatory drawings for her larger pieces. These pieces include self-portraits and portraits of both her aunt and their husband. Much of her art remains at the house to this day. She painted the Stations of the Cross at St Mary Immaculate Church, Warwick consisting of 14 paintings on canvas in decorated blind openings, installed in 1897. She continued painting until she was 90—even after she was confined to her room, she had her paints and easel brought up.

== Legacy ==
Orpen had no children with either of her husbands. She left behind, instead, a legacy of art and contributions to the maintenance of an historic English home. Baddesley Clinton is now a National Trust property, and many of Rebecca Orpen's effects, including many paintings, are now held by the Trust. Some of her sketches and letters are also had by the Shakespeare Birthplace Trust.
