= Hans Schlitte =

German merchant (died c. 1557)

Hans Schlitte was a salesman from Goslar, Germany. He was born in the second half of the 15th century, and died around 1557. In an unfortunate deal in Pskov, he lost a large sum of money, and then traveled to Moscow in order to attempt legal means of recovering the loss. There, he was approached by the tsar to hire Western experts, which led to the later case against him.

== Case of Schlitte ==
The Case of Schlitte is a trial against Hans Schlitte which was held in 1548 in Lübeck. Russian tsar Ivan the Terrible asked Hans Schlitte to hire a lot of masters and doctors in order to bring European technologies and knowledge back to Russia.

Schlitte managed to hire around 300 men. The first of the men tried to come to Russia through Livonia, but were kept in Wenden (now Cēsis, Latvia). The rest of hired men tried to reach Russia by sea, but also failed to do it.

== Literature ==
- К делу Ганса Шлитте // Копенгагенские акты, относящиеся к русской истории. Первый выпуск 1326—1569 гг. / Пер. Ю. Н. Щербачёва // Чтения в обществе истории и древностей Российских при Московском университете. — № 4. — Moscow, 1915.
- Bernhard Diestelkamp, Eine versuchte Annäherung Zar Iwans IV., des Schrecklichen, an den Westen? Ein Reichskammergerichtsprozess, der dies Nahelegt. In: Reich, Regionen und Europa in Mittelalter und Neuzeit. Festschrift für Peter Moraw. Berlin 2000, lk 305–322.
- P. Pierling S. I., Papes et tsars (1547-1597) d'après des documents nouveaux, Parigi Retaux-Bray, 1890, citato in La Civiltà Cattolica, serie XIV, volume V, fascicolo 959, 1890, pag. 714-715. Google Books
- Rusakovskiy, Oleg (2017). Das erste russische Militärrecht für fremde Söldner? [The first Russian military law for foreign mercenaries?] (in German). OCLC 1199724316.
