= Antonio Spadaro =

Italian Jesuit priest, journalist and writer

The Reverend Dr. Antonio Spadaro SJ
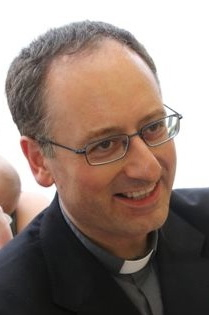
- Born: 6 July 1966 (age 60); Messina, Sicily, Italy
- Education: University of Messina; Pontifical Gregorian University
- Occupations: Official of the Holy See and Vatican City State
- Organization: Society of Jesus
- Title: Editor of La Civiltà Cattolica
- Term: 1 October 2011 — present
- Predecessor: Gianpaolo Salvini
- Successor: incumbent

Antonio Spadaro, SJ (born 6 July 1966) is an Italian Jesuit priest, journalist and writer.

== Career ==
Spadaro has been the editor in chief of the Jesuit-affiliated journal La Civiltà Cattolica since 2011. He is also a consultor to both the Pontifical Council for Culture and the Secretariat for Communications (previously known as the Pontifical Council for Social Communications).

He is described as being very close to Pope Francis, who was also a Jesuit. The pope named him as the incoming secretary of the Dicastery for Culture and Education in September 2023.

== Controversy ==
In July 2017, Spadaro co-wrote, an article entitled "Evangelical Fundamentalism and Catholic Integralism," in which he and Argentine Presbyterian Marcelo Figueroa criticized the supporters of United States president Donald Trump. The article was approved by the Cardinal Secretary of State, Pietro Parolin, and published in the Jesuit journal La Civiltà Cattolica. Spadaro and Figueroa described American political life as Manichaean and said the Trump administration was responsible for promoting an "apocalyptic geopolitics", comparing American conservative Christians to ISIS. Spadaro also criticized American Catholics who supported the conservative movement and Trump in particular.

Spadaro later published an article in which he criticized Trump advisor Steve Bannon for his ideological ties to Calvinist theologian R. J. Rushdoony. He also singled out Church Militant for "shocking rhetoric." Spadaro said that American Catholics and Protestants both promoted an "ecumenism of conflict" over abortion, same-sex marriage, and religious education in schools that also included a "xenophobic and Islamophobic vision", transforming it into an intolerant "ecumenism of hate." The article also criticized conservatives for being uncritical of militarism, capitalism and the arms industry and for disregarding the environment.

Spadaro's critiques were praised by progressive Catholic publications in the United States, such as the National Catholic Reporter and Commonweal. He was rebuffed, however, by P.J. Smith in First Things and the retired Archbishop of Philadelphia, Charles J. Chaput, who described the criticisms as inaccurate and biased. In 2026, it was revealed that Bannon—a major target of Spadaro's critiques—had attempted to collaborate with sex offender Jeffrey Epstein to "take down" Pope Francis.
