= St Mary Immaculate Roman Catholic Church, Warwick =

St Mary Immaculate, Warwick
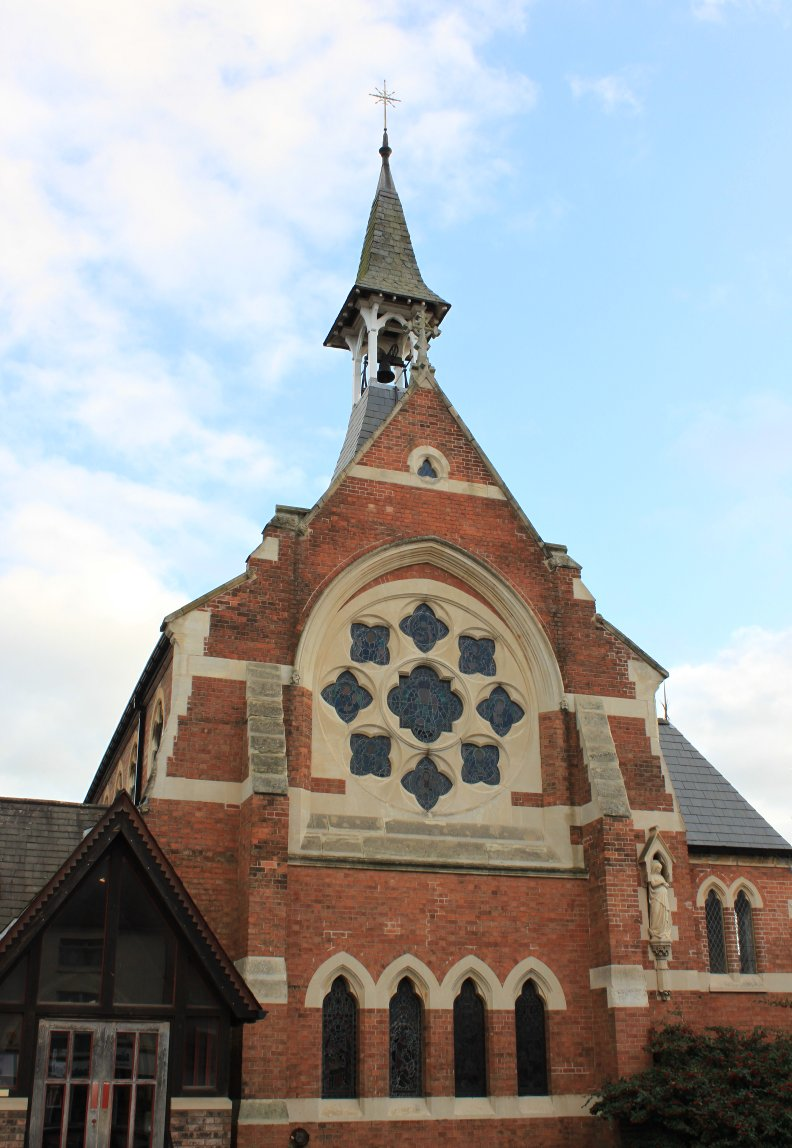
- St Mary's Church from West Street

- Location within Warwickshire
- 52.2785°N 1.5916°W
- OS grid reference: SP 27960 64565
- Location: Warwick, Warwickshire
- Country: England
- Denomination: Roman Catholic
- Website: https://www.stmary-immaculate.org.uk/

Architecture
- Functional status: Active
- Heritage designation: Grade II
- Designated: 24 February 1993
- Architect: E. W. Pugin
- Style: Decorated Gothic

Administration
- Province: Birmingham
- Diocese: Birmingham

St Mary Immaculate is an active Roman Catholic parish church in the town of Warwick, England. It lies to the south west of the town on West Street outside the West Gate. The church was opened on 12 May 1860. The architect was Edward Welby Pugin, eldest son of Augustus Pugin. The church is built in red brick and Bath stone in the Decorated Gothic style and is a Grade II listed building. The builder was William Gascoyne (1827–1902) of Leamington. St Mary Immaculate was one of the first churches in England to be dedicated to the Immaculate Conception after the definition of the dogma in 1854. It was the first permanent Roman Catholic church in Warwick. The church was consecrated on 15 June 1939. The presbytery was built at the same time as the church but has been altered.

During the First World War (1914–1918) J. R. R. Tolkien, the author of over 56 books, including The Lord of the Rings, married parishioner Edith Mary Bratt in the church on 22 March 1916. A blue plaque commemorating the marriage was unveiled in July 2018.

The church is linked to St Mary Immaculate Catholic Primary School which was originally in the building next to the church, built in 1905. This building is now the church hall. Since 1973 St Mary Immaculate Catholic Primary School occupies a much larger site next to Priory Park.

Glass

The three stained glass windows in the centre of the east window in the apse were completed in 1861 by Hardman & Co of Birmingham.

The West Window, a rose window above the gallery, was designed and produced by John Hardman Studios in the 1960s. A large round window depicting Christ the King is surrounded by eight small windows depicting saints.

All of the other stained glass windows were by designed by a parishioner who was at the time living and working in Smith Street, Warwick, the French-born artist, Tony (Antoine) Dury (1819–96).

The Sanctuary

The painting of Our Lady of Perpetual Succour in the centre and 18 other roundels were painted by Thomas Fisher Norman (previously thought to be by Alphege Pippet) of Hardman & Co in 1893.

Font

The stone baptismal font dated bears two brass plates, dated 1860, in memory of parishioners John and Elizabeth Norman, the parents of Thomas Fisher Norman of Hardman & Co.

Stations of the Cross

The Stations of the Cross consist of 14 paintings on canvas in decorated blind openings, painted by Rebecca Dulcibella Orpen (1830–1923) of Baddesley Clinton Hall and installed in 1897.

Bell Turret

The bell turret behind the west gable consists of a timber bellcote with a slate spire and a wrought iron cross. In front of the turret is a stone cross. On the east gable is a wrought iron cross. Taylor's of Leicester, a bell foundry since the 14th century, have records showing that the bell had been cast in 1860 by John Murphy of Dublin.

Church Hall Bell

The bell in the Hall's bellcote is inscribed John Taylor & Co and with the words ‘Ave Maria’. Taylor's records say that it was15 inches in diameter, sounded the note ‘C’ and weighed ‘2 quarters and 2 pounds’, and that it had been ordered on 27 September 1904 and despatched by the company on 14 October. Taylor's restored it in 2019.
