= Azeglio (name) =

- Pronunciation: IPA: [adˈdzeʎʎo]
- Gender: Male

Origin
- Region of origin: Italy

Other names
- Variant form: Azelio

Azeglio, or less commonly Azelio, is an Italian masculine given name. Famous people with this given name include:

- Carlo Azeglio Ciampi (1920–2016), Italian politician, President of Italy 1999–2006
- Azelio Manzetti (1929–2013), Italian priest
- Azeglio Terreni (1895–?), Italian racing cyclist
- Azeglio Vicini (1933–2018), Italian football coach
