= Don't Make Any Plans for Tonight =

- Directed by: Gianluca Maria Tavarelli
- Written by: Gianluca Maria Tavarelli
- Starring: Luca Zingaretti; Giorgio Tirabassi; Andrea Renzi; Giuseppe Battiston; Donatella Finocchiaro
- Cinematography: Roberto Forza
- Music by: Luigi Seviroli
- Release date: 2006
- Running time: 96 minutes
- Country: Italy
- Language: Italian

Don't Make Any Plans for Tonight (Italian: Non prendere impegni stasera) is a 2006 Italian drama film written and directed by Gianluca Maria Tavarelli.

It was screened in the Horizons section at the 63rd Venice International Film Festival, in which Micaela Ramazzotti won the Wella Award.

== Plot ==
The film follows the misguided, troubled lives of four men in their 40's living in a cold, aloof Rome.

== Cast ==
- Luca Zingaretti as Andrea
- Giorgio Tirabassi as Pietro
- Andrea Renzi as Alessandro
- Alessandro Gassmann as Giorgio
- Giuseppe Battiston as Vittorio
- Micaela Ramazzotti as Veronica
- Donatella Finocchiaro as Paola
- Valeria Milillo as Irene
- Francesca Inaudi as Mariella
- Paola Cortellesi as Cinzia
- Valerio Binasco as Nanni
- Rocco Papaleo as Nicola
- Michela Cescon as Iole
- Zoe Tavarelli as Elena
- Valeria Sabel as Medium

== See also ==
- List of Italian films of 2004
