= Baddesley Clinton (village) =

Village in Warwickshire, England

Coordinates: 52.352°N 1.695°W

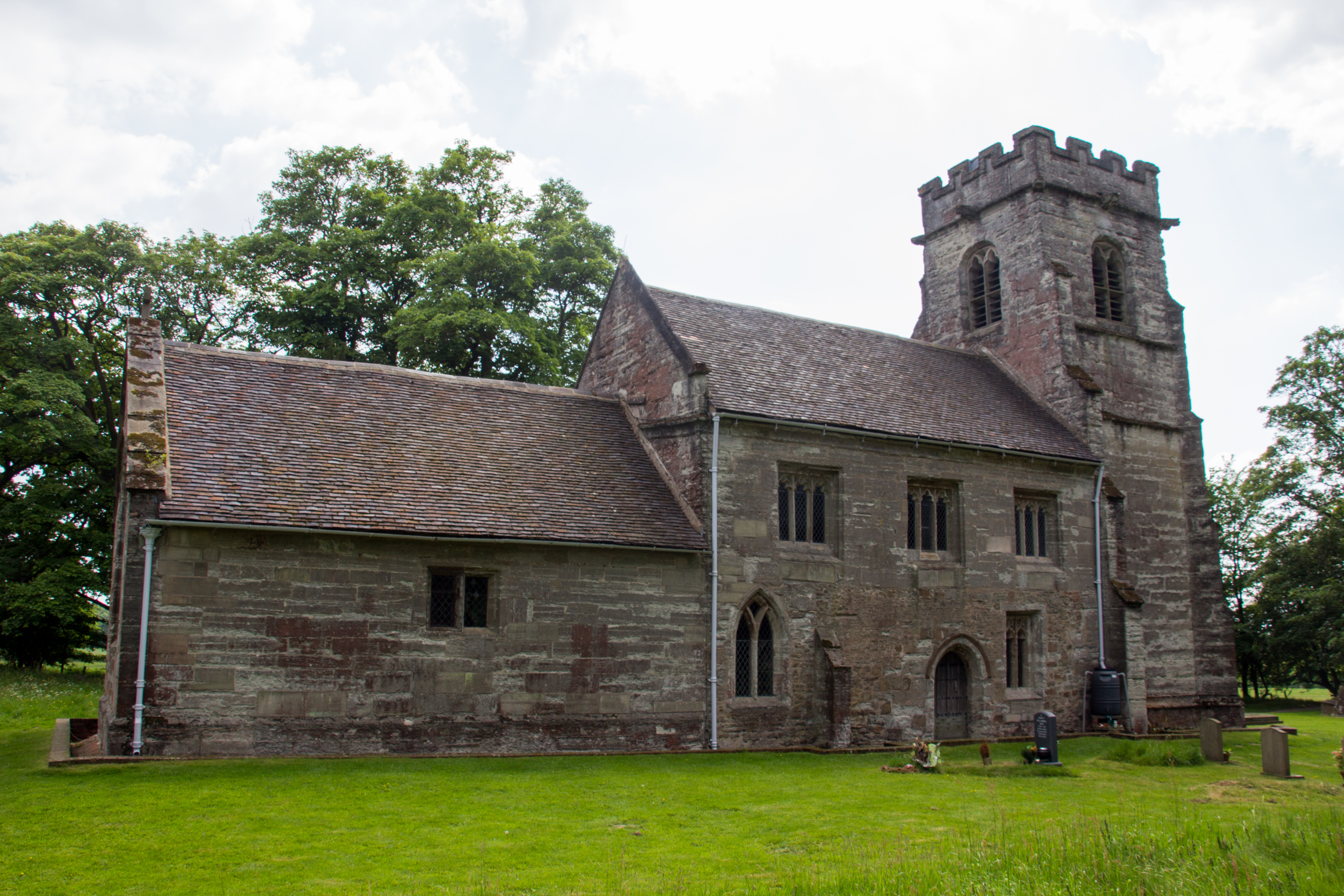
- St Michael's Church, Baddesley Clinton

- Location within Warwickshire
- Area: 5.519 km^{2} (2.131 sq mi)
- Population: 182 (2011 census)
  - Density: 33/km^{2} (85/sq mi)
- Civil parish: Baddesley Clinton
- District: Warwick
- Shire county: Warwickshire
- Region: West Midlands
- Country: England
- Sovereign state: United Kingdom
- Post town: Solihull
- Postcode district: B93

Baddesley Clinton is a village and civil parish in Warwickshire, England, about 5 1/2 miles (9 km) southeast of Solihull. The village has Anglo-Saxon origins. It is believed that at some point it was settled by an Anglo-Saxon called Baeddi, Badde or Bade as a clearing in the Forest of Arden to graze cattle. Such a clearing was called a leah or ley – hence Badde's Ley which became Baddesley. Through most of the medieval era, the village was part of Hampton in Arden. In 1290 it passed to the de Clinton family. The de Clintons were a powerful Norman family of the area and held Maxstoke Castle, Brandon Castle and Kenilworth Castle at various times. It was at this point that it became known as Baddesley Clinton. The village is famed for its National Trust property, Baddesley Clinton. The village also has a Grade II listed church dedicated to St Michael, which shares a Rector with St Mary the Virgin's church in the nearby parish of Lapworth.
