= Tavarelli =

Tavarelli is a surname. Notable people with the surname include:

- Gianluca Maria Tavarelli (born 1964), Italian director and screenwriter
- Ricardo Tavarelli (born 1970), Paraguayan footballer
- Zoe Tavarelli (born 1996), Italian actress
