= Georgiana Chatterton =

English aristocrat and author (1806–1876)

Henrietta Georgiana Marcia Lascelles Chatterton
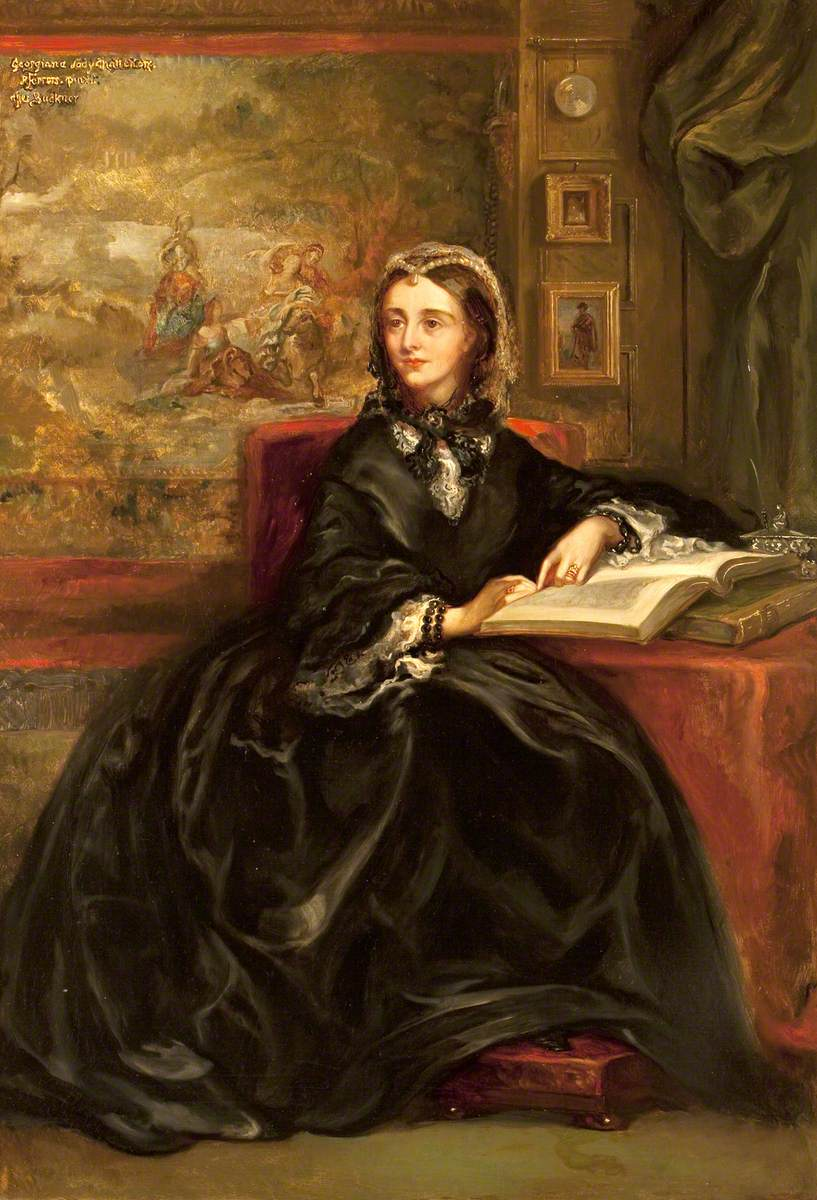
- Portrait of Lady Chatterton, c. 1859, by her niece Rebecca Orpen
- Born: 11 November 1806
- Died: 6 February 1876 (aged 69)

Georgiana, Lady Chatterton, later Mrs Dering (née Iremonger; 11 November 1806 – 6 February 1876) was an English aristocrat, traveller, and author. Her first travelogue, Rambles in the South of Ireland, was published in 1839.

== Life ==
Henrietta Georgiana Marcia Lascelles Iremonger was born at 24 Arlington Street, Piccadilly, London, on 11 November 1806, the only child of the Rev. Lascelles Iremonger (died 6 January 1830), a prebendary of Winchester Cathedral, and his second wife, the former Harriett Gambier, youngest sister of Admiral Lord James Gambier. Her mother's family had been acquainted with Samuel Johnson, William Wilberforce, Madame de Staël, Sir Joshua Reynolds, and Hannah More, among other public figures, who visited their seat at Barham Court. According to parish records, Georgiana was baptised on 2 December 1805 at St George's Hanover Square Church, suggesting that her reported year of birth may be inaccurate. Georgiana's family travelled frequently, visiting various relatives. They more commonly stayed with her Uncle William Pitt Morgan and Aunt Margaret, who often had lunch with King George III.

On 3 August 1824, Georgiana was presented before the Court to the King and Queen in a formal ceremony. At her debutante's ball, she met Sir William Abraham Chatterton, 2nd Baronet of Castle Mahon, County Cork, who was 18 years her senior. She married him aged 17 on 3 August 1824 at St George's Hanover Square Church. They spent their early married years at his home in Castle Mahon, Cork, Ireland, and in Winchester with Georgiana's parents. While living in County Cork, Georgiana's poor health caused her to move to Florence, Italy, a city which at the time was expanding with cultural and social diversity and ideas. This increased her interest in writing novels. She spent several subsequent winters abroad.

After her father's death, the couple moved to Seamore Place in Mayfair where they were known for their wealth and were regular guests of King William IV. Georgiana often visited Princess Victoria at Tunbridge Wells. There she wrote her first work of fiction, entitled Aunt Dorothy's Tales, and published it anonymously. Soon after, in 1839, she published a second novel, Rambles in South Ireland, which was well received, selling out within weeks. She would continue writing novels every two years, while keeping up a thriving social life with London's literary intelligentsia.

In 1845–1851, the Great Irish Famine deprived her husband of his rents and forced them to move back to England and stay in Rolls Park in Essex until 5 August 1855, when Sir William Chatterton died. After two years of grieving, Georgiana and Rebecca Orpen, Sir William's niece, who was in her care, decided to resume regularly attending parties and social gatherings. Soon after, Georgiana met a fellow novelist, Edward Heneage Dering, (born 1827, youngest son of John Dering, rector of Pluckley, Kent, and prebendary of St Paul's Cathedral). Edward's intention was to marry Rebecca, but due to poor hearing Lady Chatterton assumed the proposal was made to her. On 1 June 1859, the widow married Dering and they took up residence in 1869 with Rebecca and her husband Marmion, the last old squire of Baddesley Clinton Hall, Warwickshire. There Marmion and Dering took to wearing 17th-century costume.

Within six years of their marriage, Dering was received into the Roman Catholic Church. Georgiana herself wavered, but after a correspondence with William Bernard Ullathorne, Roman Catholic Bishop of Birmingham, she converted as well in August 1875. Her husband stated that she lived by three principles during her lifetime: to know the will of God and do it; to see everything exactly how it was, without reference to her own wishes; and never to turn aside from a difficulty, however easily avoided.

Georgiana Dering died at Baddesley Clinton Hall on 6 February 1876, aged 69. She was a successful author, and died extremely wealthy, leaving an estate valued at just under £40,000. She was buried at the Catholic Church of St Francis of Assisi, where Edward Dering, Rebecca Ferrers and her husband Marmion would later be buried as well.

== Writings ==
Lady Chatterton's first book, Aunt Dorothy's Tales (1837), was published anonymously in two volumes. Two years later came Rambles in the South of Ireland, whose first edition sold out in weeks. Many other tales, novels, poems and travel accounts followed, under the name Georgiana Chatterton. Despite the extreme success of her first two novels, Georgiana would often remark that her books never made "a hit".

In her novel Allanson, or The Infidel (1843), she explains how she feared she might appear a different person to others than she really was: "Most of us try to be blind to our own inconsistencies, and this, perhaps, makes us less aware of the inconsistency of others". Later, she noted how there were good men that would not commit a bad act even when tempted and bad men who would never do a good act when tempted. While writing this book, Lady Chatterton kept up a self-enforced solitude.

Chatterton's poem "Leonore" (1864) indicated her kindness to others. Her behaviour towards strangers and friends is described in her writings: "The most agreeable persons are certainly those who have the greatest faith in the goodness of others. By appealing to the best feelings of those with whom we converse, by giving them credit for good qualities... [we bring] these good feelings into play."

Lady Chatterton, in Spain and the Pyrenees, wrote of her adventures and travels around the world, making observations and telling stories. One such is a disagreement with the Pope, in a short story that explains how marriage is banned on pain of excommunication. Cardinal John Henry Newman praised her refinement of thought in her later fiction. More recently, however, her work has been described as banal and called "uniformly unmemorable".

== Legacy: sketches found ==
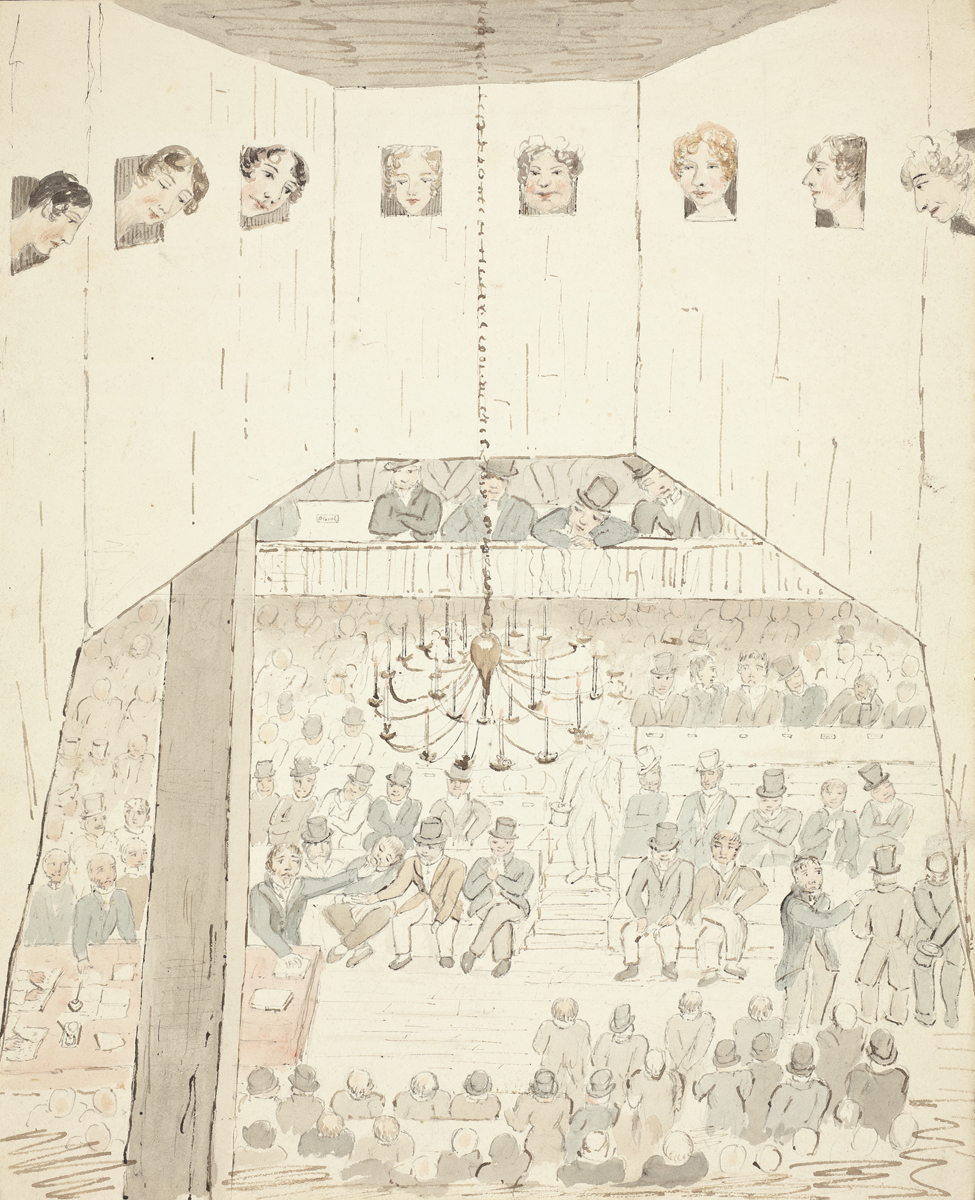
Lady Chatterton's drawing in Rebecca's sketchbook.

In 2015, an archivist from the Dering collection at the Shakespeare Birthplace Trust found a sketch in one of Rebecca Dering's sketchbooks that was drawn by Georgiana herself. It was found with two tickets to Westminster Hall for 11 July 1821, about nine years before Rebecca Dering was born. The sketch itself is a drawing of eight women with their heads sticking through the windows of the Parliament building while it is in session. Women used to gather in the space above the ceiling and listen in, since they were not allowed to participate and be present during a session. The drawing is presented from Georgiana's point of view as she is able to see the other women at her level also looking down on the structure beneath. The assumption that Georgiana drew this sketch is due to her elevated social position, allowing her to travel to Westminster and acquire tickets to enter the House of Commons. This drawing is significant because it shows how women politically engaged, whether it was from listening from a ventilator in the ceiling or persuading men to vote for local leaders. Though such women as Lady Chatterton were often able to influence politics, they could only do so indirectly, still managing to make their mark on a world almost a hundred years before female suffrage was achieved in the United Kingdom.

== Publications ==
- Aunt Dorothy's Tale anonymous, 1837
- Rambles in the South of Ireland 1839
- A Good Match, The Heiress of Drosberg, and The Cathedral Chorister 1840; another edition, 1868
- Home Sketches and Foreign Recollections 1841
- The Pyrenees, with Excursions into Spain 1843
- Allanston, or the Infidel 1843
- Lost Happiness, or the Effects of a Lie a tale, 1845
- Reflections on the History of the Kings of Judah 1848
- Extracts from Jean Paul F. Richter 1851
- Compensation anonymous, 1856
- Life and its Realities 1857
- The Reigning Beauty 1858
- Memorials of Admiral Lord Gambier 1861
- Selections from the Works of Plato 1862
- The Heiress and her Lovers 1863
- Leonore, a Tale, and other Poems 1864
- Quagmire ahead privately printed, 1864
- Grey's Court edited by Lady Chatterton, 1865
- Oswald of Deira a drama, 1867
- A Plea for Happiness and Hope privately printed, 1867
- Country Coteries 1868
- The Oak original tales and sketches by Sir J. Bowring, Lady Chatterton, and others, 1869
- Lady May a pastoral poem, 1869
- The Lost Bride 1872
- Won at last 1874
- Extracts from Aristotle's Work privately printed, 1875
- Misgiving privately printed, 1875
- Convictions privately printed, 1875
- The Consolation of the Devout Soul by J. Frassinetti, translated by Lady Chatterton, 1876
