= Matteo Liberatore =

Italian Jesuit philosopher and theologian (1810–1892)

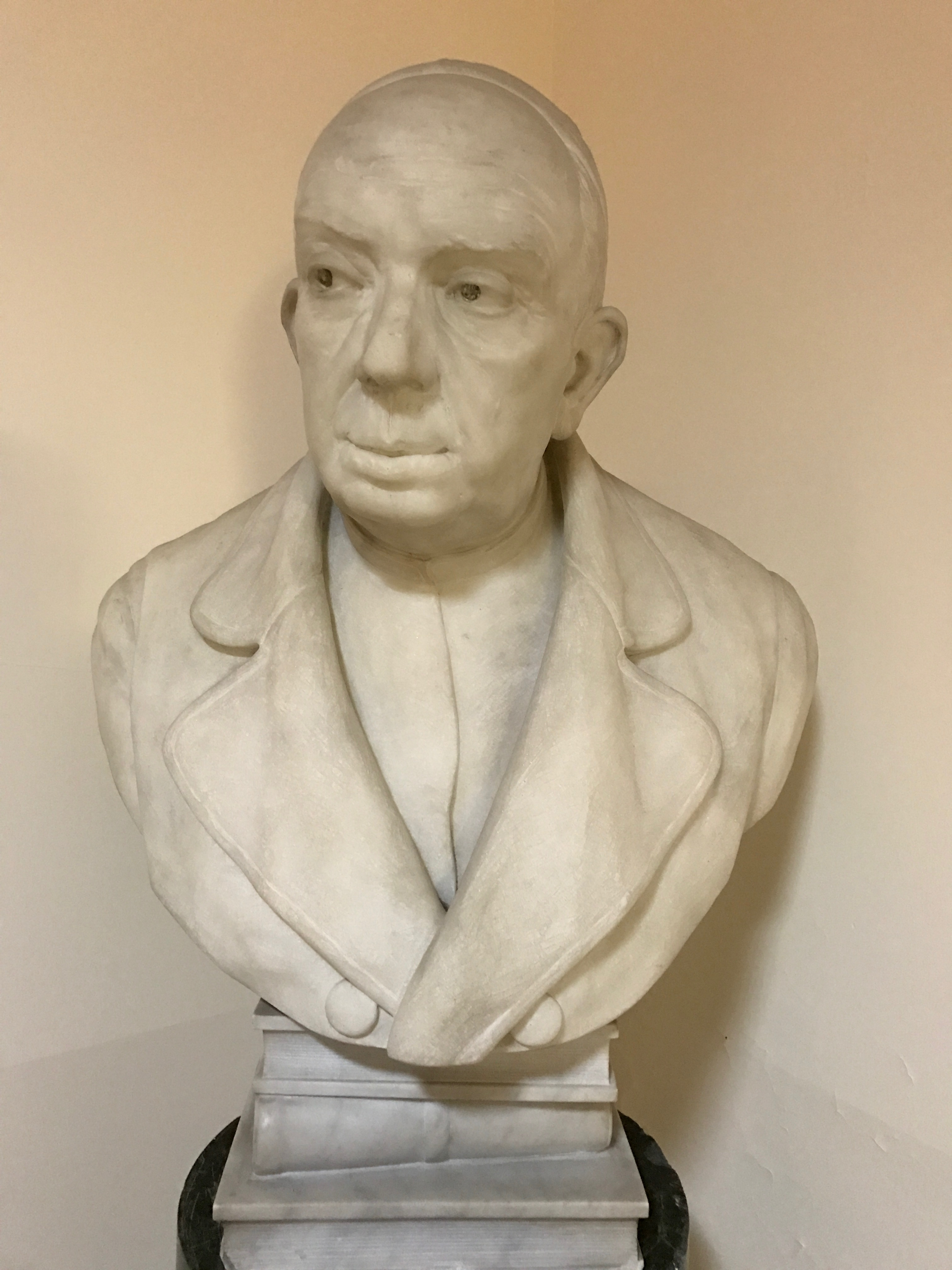
Matteo Liberatore

Matteo Liberatore, SJ (born at Salerno, Italy, 14 August 1810; died at Rome, 18 October 1892) was an Italian Jesuit philosopher, theologian, and writer. He helped popularize the Jesuit periodical Civiltà Cattolica in close collaboration with the papacy in the last half of the 19th century and was the primary author of the 1891 encyclical, Rerum novarum.

== Life ==
Matteo was the son of Nicola Liberatore, a magistrate, and Caterina De Rosa who was from a noble Albanian family of Barile. He studied at the College of the Jesuits at Naples in 1825, and a year later applied for admission into the Society of Jesus, entering the novitiate on 9 October 1826. He taught philosophy at the Jesuit college of Naples for eleven years, from 1837 until the Revolution of 1848 drove him to Malta.

On returning to Italy he was appointed to teach theology, but gave up his professorship in 1850 to cofound Civiltà Cattolica, a periodical founded by the Jesuits to defend the cause of the Church and the papacy, and to spread the knowledge of the doctrine of Thomas Aquinas. Liberatore's helped bring about the revival of the scholastic philosophy of Aquinas, publishing his own course of philosophy in 1842. This movement he promoted in the classroom, by textbooks on philosophy, by articles in Civiltà Cattolica and other periodicals, by larger and more extensive works, and also by his work as a member of the Accademia Romana by appointment of Leo XIII. In 1879 he contributed to Leo XIII's encyclical Aeterni Patris on scholastic philosophy, promoting the teaching of Thomism in all Catholic schools. He also collaborated in the writing of the encyclical Immortale Dei (1885) and wrote the first draft and several revisions of Leo's ground-breaking social encyclical Rerum novarum (1891).

For 42 years, from 1850 to 1892, Liberatore published over 390 articles, many apologetic in defense of the Holy See, drawing attention to Civiltà Cattolica. He predicted a more universal role for the papacy with the loss of temporal power. He was a close collaborator with Pius IX and Leo XIII and taught a philosophy course at the Pontifical Gregorian University where his students included Ambrogio Ratti, the future Pope Pius XI.

== Works ==
Sommervogel records more than forty of his published works, and gives the titles of more than nine hundred of his articles (including reviews) which appeared in Civiltà Cattolica alone. His works include:

- Institutiones Philosophicæ (1842)
- Le Commedie Filosofiche (1863)
- Chiesa e Stato (1871)
- Spicilegio 1878)
- Della Conoscenza Intellettuale: volume 1 (1857), volume 2 (1858)
- Del Composto Umano (1880)
- Degli Universali (1885)
- Compendium ethicae et iuris naturae (1886)
- Of ecclesiastical public law (1887)
- Principles of political economy (1889)
- Compendium logicae et metaphysicae (1891)

English translations of Degli universali and Principii di economia politica were published by Edward Heneage Dering.

== Sources ==
- Discepolo, Salvatore (2005). "LIBERATORE, Matteo". Dizionario Biografico degli Italiani (in Italian). Vol. 65: Levis–Lorenzetti. Rome: Istituto dell'Enciclopedia Italiana. ISBN 978-88-12-00032-6.

- ; the entry cites:
  - "Il P. Matteo Liberatore," Civiltà Cattolica, Vol. IV, 1892, pp. 352–380;
  - "P. Matteo Liberatore, S.J." American Ecclesiastical Review, Vol. VII, 1892, pp. 441–445;
  - Sommervogel, Carlo (1893). "Liberatore, Matthieu." In: Bibliothèque des Écrivains de la Compagnie de Jésus, Vol. IV. Bruxelles: Oscar Schepens, pp. 1774–1803.
