= Baddesley Clinton =

Moated manor house near Warwick, England

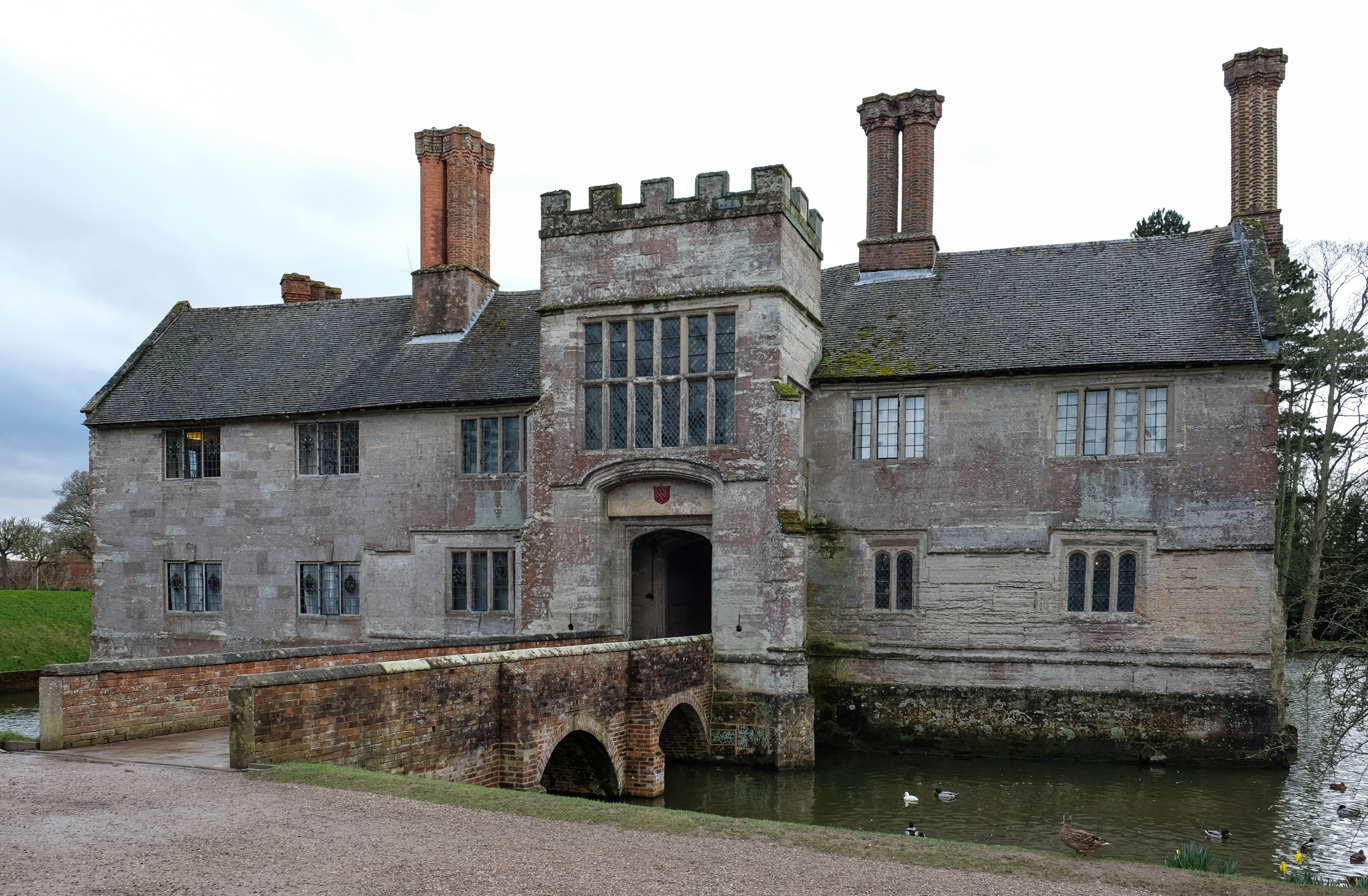
- Interactive map of Baddesley Clinton
- Location: Baddesley Clinton, Warwickshire, England
- Coordinates: 52.34101°N 1.70860°W
- OS grid reference: SP199714

Listed Building – Grade I
- Official name: Baddesley Clinton House and bridge over moat
- Designated: 11 April 1967
- Reference no.: 1035136

Listed Building – Grade II
- Official name: Baddesley Clinton House, Stables approximately 10 metres north east
- Designated: 11 April 1967
- Reference no.: 1364991

Listed Building – Grade II
- Official name: Baddesley Clinton House, the Cottage and Coachhouse approximately 90 metres east
- Designated: 13 November 1974
- Reference no.: 1035100

Listed Building – Grade II
- Official name: Baddesley Clinton House, Barn approximately 60 metres east
- Designated: 16 February 1990
- Reference no.: 1364969

Scheduled monument
- Official name: Baddesley Clinton Hall moated site and fishponds
- Designated: 17 July 1995
- Reference no.: 1013155

National Register of Historic Parks and Gardens
- Official name: Baddesley Clinton Hall
- Type: Grade II
- Designated: 1 February 1986
- Reference no.: 1001186

Baddesley Clinton is a moated manor house, about 8 miles (13 km) north-west of the town of Warwick, in the village of Baddesley Clinton, Warwickshire, England. The house probably originated in the 13th century, when large areas of the Forest of Arden were cleared for farmland. The site is a Scheduled Ancient Monument and the house is a Grade I listed building. The house, park and gardens are owned by the National Trust and open to the public; they lie in a civil parish of the same name.

== History ==
The history of Baddesley Clinton begins with a saxon named Badde, although spelling is variable, who sheltered cattle in a clearing in the wood known as a leah or ley. From this, we have Badde's Ley.

After the Norman Conquest beginning in 1066, Baddesley was granted to Geoffrey de Wirce. Next it was transferred to Walter de Bisege and remained with his family until his great-granddaughter Mazera inherited the property and it became the property of the Clinton family through her marriage to Sir Thomas Clinton in 1290. This is when the estate became known as Baddesley Clinton.

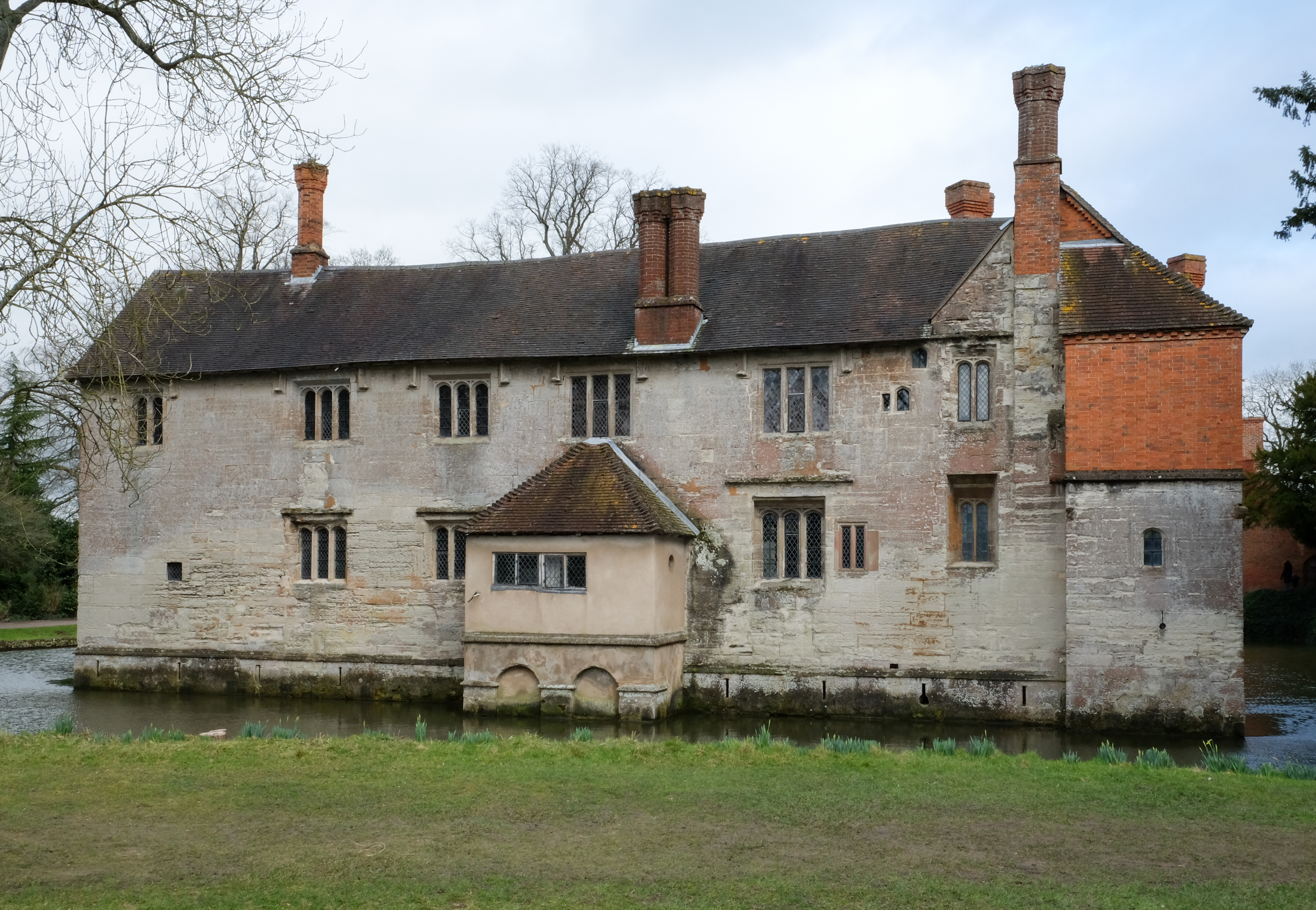
Baddesley Clinton rear (south-west) elevation

In 1438, John Brome, Under-Treasurer of England, purchased the manor, which passed to his son, Nicholas Brome (d.1517), who rebuilt the nearby parish church dedicated to St Michael, as a penance for having murdered the parish priest, a crime reputed to have been committed inside the house. The house from this period was equipped with gun-ports, and possibly a drawbridge over the moat. When Nicholas Brome died in 1517, the house passed to his daughter, who in 1500 had married Sir Edward Ferrers, Sheriff of Warwickshire.

Henry Ferrers (1549–1633), "The Antiquary", believed to have built the great hall, made many additions to Baddesley Clinton, including starting the tradition of installing stained glass to represent the family's coat of arms. Such glass survives in many rooms. In the 18th century the great hall was rebuilt in brick and the east range was extended, though with great care to continue the style of the original building.

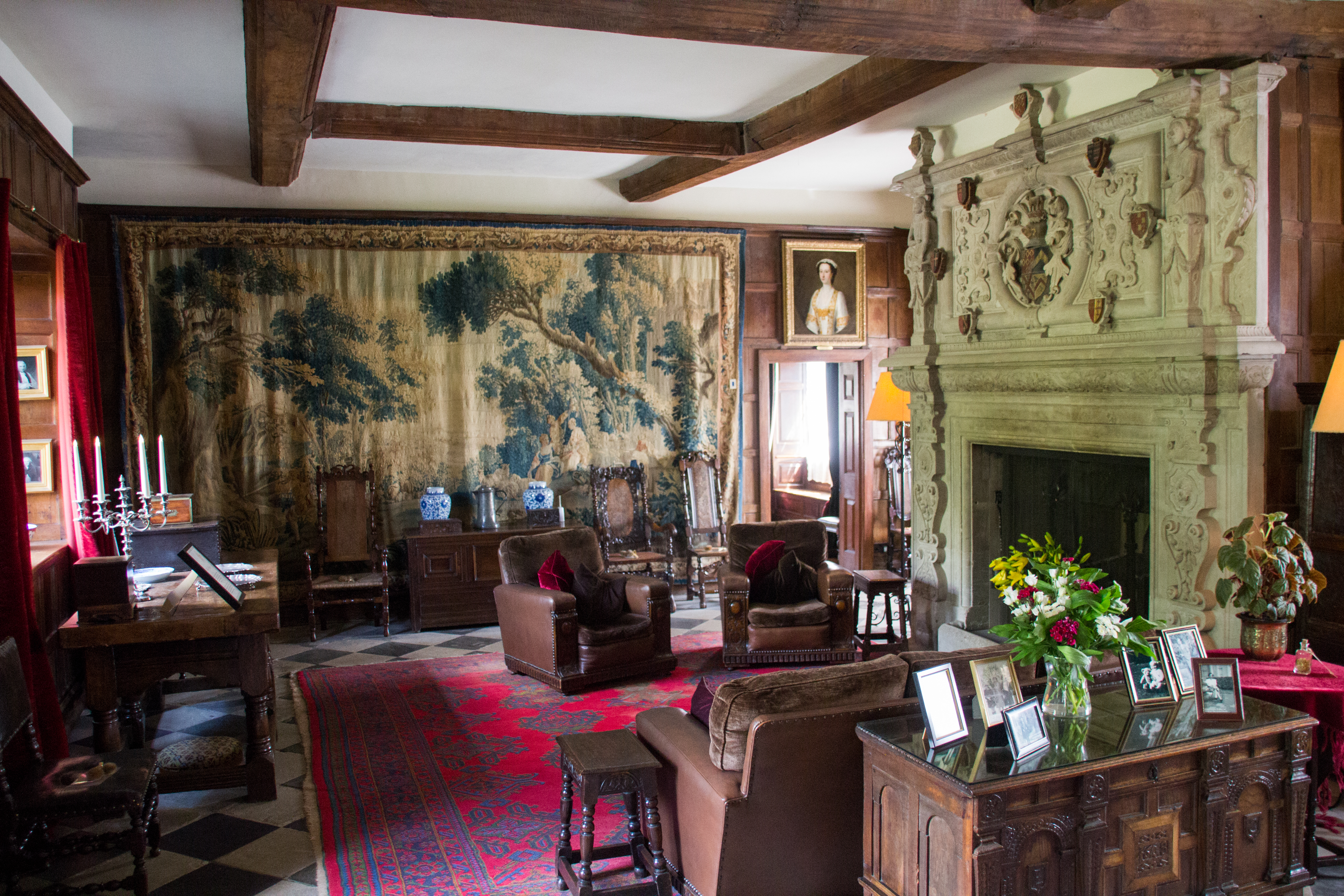
Interior of Baddesley Clinton

The house was inhabited in the 1860s by the novelists Georgiana Chatterton and her second husband Edward Heneage Dering, who both converted to Roman Catholicism. The house's Catholic chapel was rebuilt, and the house was generally refurbished. Major interior changes took place up until the 1940s, with the first floor outside the chapel being completely altered. The interior comprises a great hall, parlour and library, with other rooms, and contains much 16th century carving and furniture and 19th century accessories used by later inhabitants. The house is surrounded by extensive formal gardens and ponds. Many of the farm buildings were built in the 18th century.

The house remained in the Ferrers family until 1940, when it was purchased by Thomas Walker, a relative of the family who changed his name to Ferrers. His son, who inherited it in 1970, sold the estate in 1980 to the National Trust, which now manages it.

== Relationship with Catholicism ==
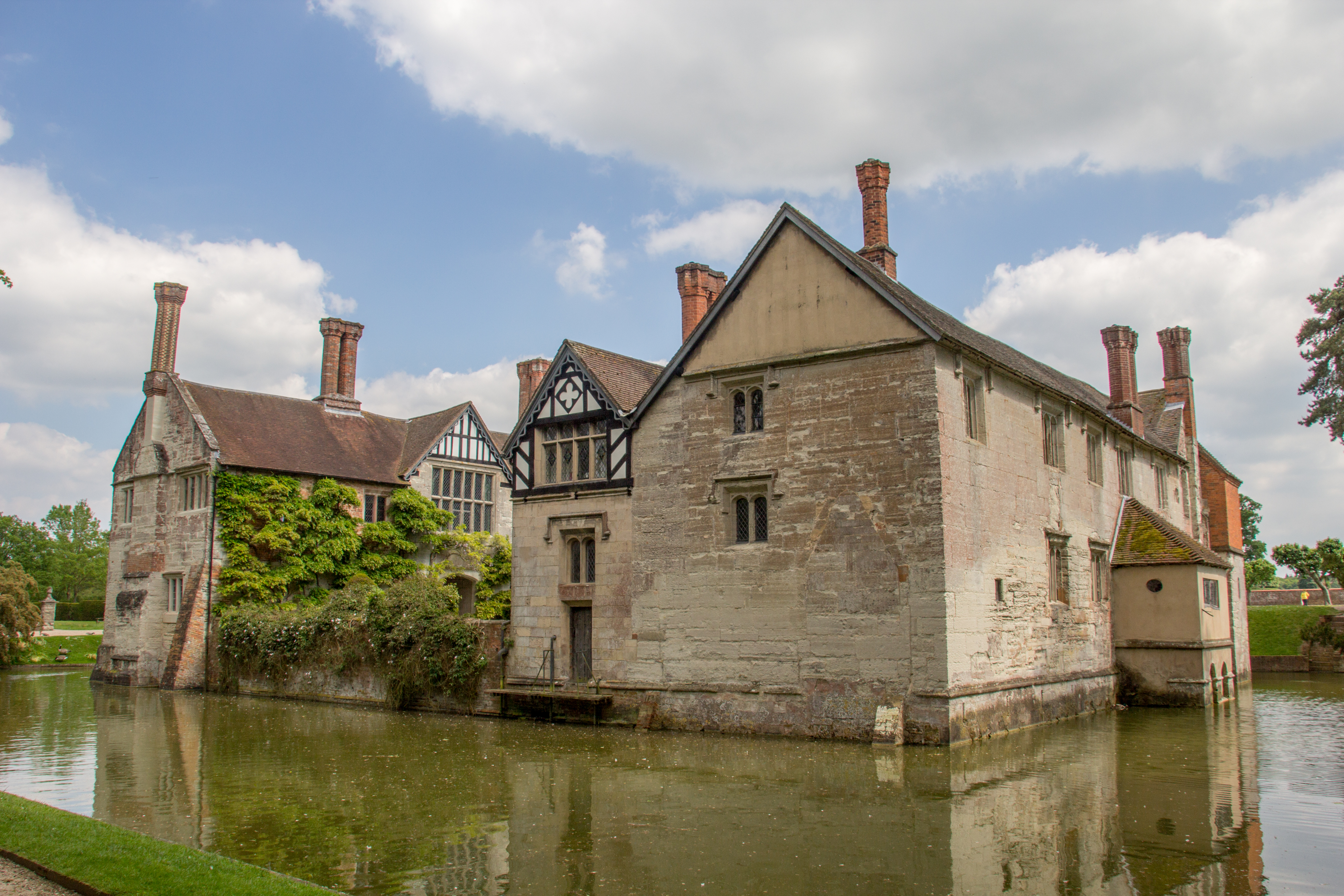
Baddesley Clinton

The Ferrers appear to have remained Roman Catholic recusants after the Reformation, along with many other members of the Warwickshire gentry. They sheltered Catholic priests, who were under threat of a death sentence if discovered, and made special arrangements to hide and protect them. Several priest holes were built, secret passages to hide people in the event of a search by the authorities. One such priest hole is in the roof and is reputed to hold six people. A second is hidden in an old privy. Fugitives were able to slide down a rope from the first floor through the old garderobe shaft into the house's sewers, which run the length of the building, which could hold six or seven people with their clothes and the equipment required for a Mass. These priest holes are said to have been built by Saint Nicholas Owen, a lay-brother of the Jesuits who constructed many masterful hides, notably at nearby Harvington Hall. He was eventually caught and tortured to death by the Protestant English government. A third space off the Moat Room, is simply a small room with a door hidden in the wood panelling and there is no real evidence that this is a hide.

The priest holes came into use at least once, in 1591 when a conference of Jesuit priests was raided by local authorities. The search is described in the Autobiography of Fr John Gerard, who was hiding during the search. The hides proved effective as no-one was caught.

== Gardens and parkland ==
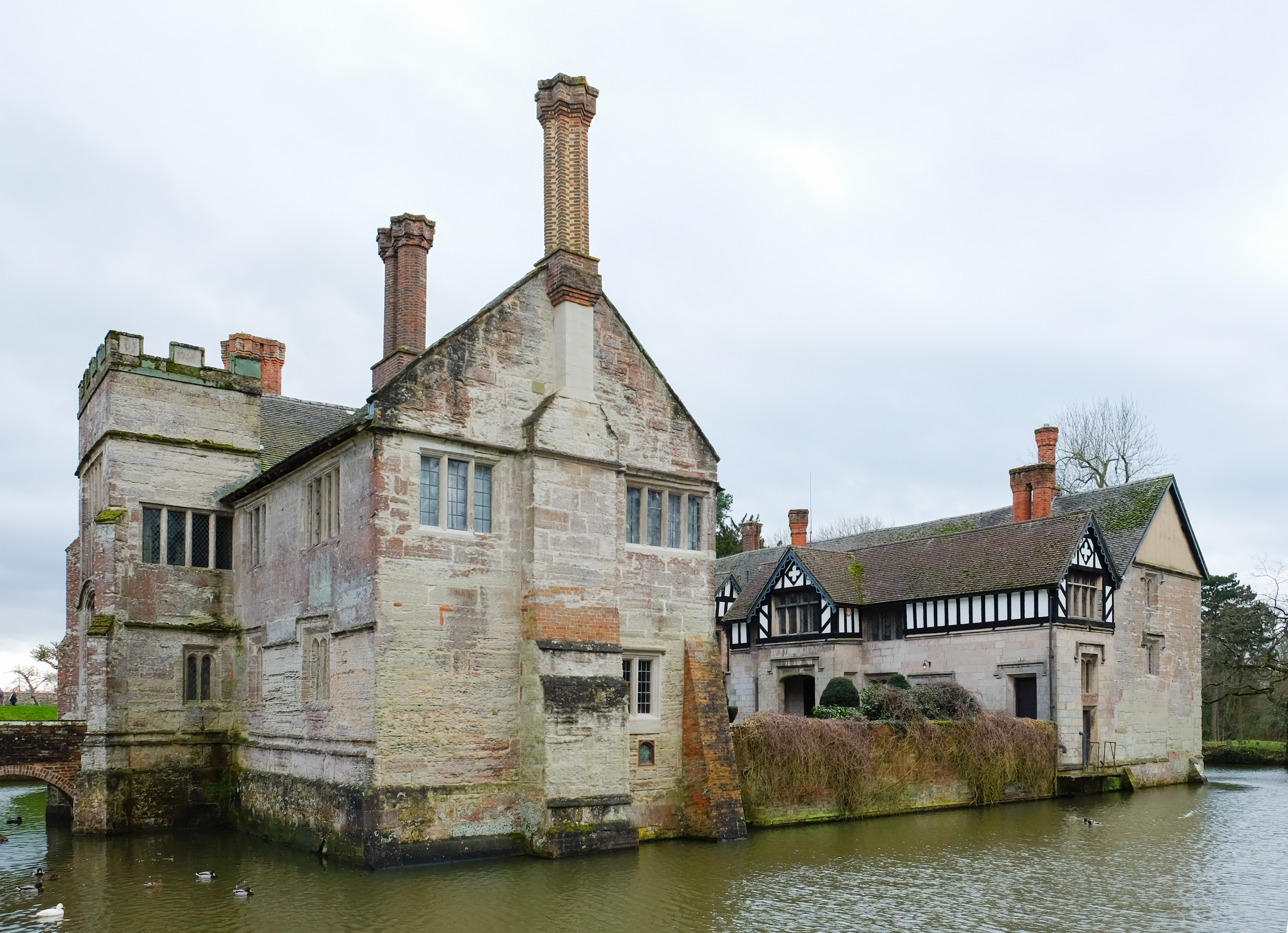
Viewed from the north-west

Parkland to the north and south-east of the house is today meadow with scattered trees, and ornamental trees south of the house. Pleasure grounds to the south-west lead down to a small lake. A formal walled garden, used in the past as a kitchen garden, lies to the south of the house; the central courtyard of the house is also laid out as a garden. The park and gardens are designated Grade II on the Register of Historic Parks and Gardens.

== Filming location ==
In 1986 a number of exterior and interior shots of Baddesley Clinton were used by Granada Television for its Sherlock Holmes series in the episode "The Adventure of the Musgrave Ritual". In October 2016 the house was the venue for BBC One's Antiques Roadshow.

Although described as "Baddesley Clinton" on the screen, the location used for the outdoor filming of the first episode of the 2017 BBC One miniseries Gunpowder depicting events surrounding the 1603 Main Plot raid was not actually Baddesley Clinton, but was Fountains Hall near Ripon in Yorkshire.
