= Azelio Manzetti =

Papal State noble (1928–2013)

Monsignor Azelio Manzetti P.A.
- Chief Chaplain of the Military Corps of the Sovereign Military Order of Malta; Chaplain of the Corps of Papal Noble Guards
- Monsignor Manzetti

Orders
- Ordination: 1953

Personal details
- Born: Azelio Giuseppe Maria Manzetti de Fort; 28 February 1928 Rome, Kingdom of Italy
- Died: 5 July 2013 (aged 85) Rome, Italy
- Denomination: Roman Catholic
- Residence: Rome, Italy
- Education: Pontifical Urban University

Azelio Giuseppe Maria Manzetti de Fort (Italian pronunciation: [adˈdzɛːljo manˈdzetti]; 28 February 1928 – 5 July 2013) was an Italian priest who was served as the Chief Chaplain of the Military Corps of the Sovereign Military Order of Malta, as well as Chief Chaplain Grand Cross ad honorem of the Grand Priory of Rome.

== Life and works ==
Manzetti was born in Rome into a very devout Catholic family, who were impoverished Italian nobility. He studied at the Pontifical Urban University from 1943–1949.

In 1953, at the age of 24 years, he became a professed priest of the Opera of Don Calabria in Verona. From the outset, he visited many cities in Italy and took charge of the spiritual formation of young people. In 1959, he was called to Rome by Luigi Cardinal Traglia, who appointed him assistant pastor of the Parish of St. Cyprian and, at the same time, assigned him to work at the Curia of the Vicariate of Rome. In 1968, he was appointed secretary and master of ceremonies of the Cardinal Vicar of the Diocese of Rome, Angelo Cardinal Dell'Acqua. He also served as Chaplain of the Corps of Papal Noble Cuards. When Paul VI abolished the Corps of Papal Noble Guards in 1970, Mons. Azelio Manzetti was its Corps Chaplain. In 1972, he directed the liturgical Office of the Vicariate. He was also appointed by the Diocese of Rome to organize activities for the Holy Year in 1975. In July 1977, he joined the Order of Malta.

Mons. Manzetti was also given the position of a Coadjutor Canon of the Papal Basilica of St. John Lateran, and Rector of the Chapel of the Knights of Rhodes. He was also made Ecclesiastical Assistant of the Acismom and Chief Chaplain of the Military Corps of the Order of Malta. He also provided ongoing spiritual care for the Hospital of St. John the Baptist in Rome, to which he dedicated his entire life. Monsignor Manzetti was present at the laying of the foundation stone of this Hospital, and since then has always enthusiastically supported the Hospital.

== Death ==
A few days before his death on 3 July 2013, Manzetti got a call from Pope Francis, who was a frequent temporary guest and Mons. Manzetti's next-door neighbour at the Domus Internationalis Paulus VI before the Conclave of March 2013. The pope expressed his sincere concern about Manzetti's medical condition. The pope also conveyed through Manzetti his greetings to all the hospital staff and patients. During the long phone call, Mons. Manzetti asked the Pope's blessing. In response, the pope said that he would only bless the prelate after having himself received the blessing of Manzetti.

Following the call of the pope was the visit of Cardinal Paolo Sardi, whom Mons. Manzetti asked to support and promote the hospital Magliana, for the sake of the sick.

In his life, Manzetti was able to meet and to work with five saints: Don Giovanni Calabria, Padre Pio of Pietrelcina, Josemaría Escrivá (Founder of Opus Dei), Pope John XXIII and Pope John Paul II.

== Award ==
- Knight Grand Cross ad honorem, Sovereign Military Order of Malta

== Links ==
- Ordine di Malta Italia
- Associazione Onlus Mons. Azelio Manzetti
- www.infooggi.it
