= Carlo Maria Curci =

Italian theologian (1810–1891)

The Reverend Carlo Maria Curci
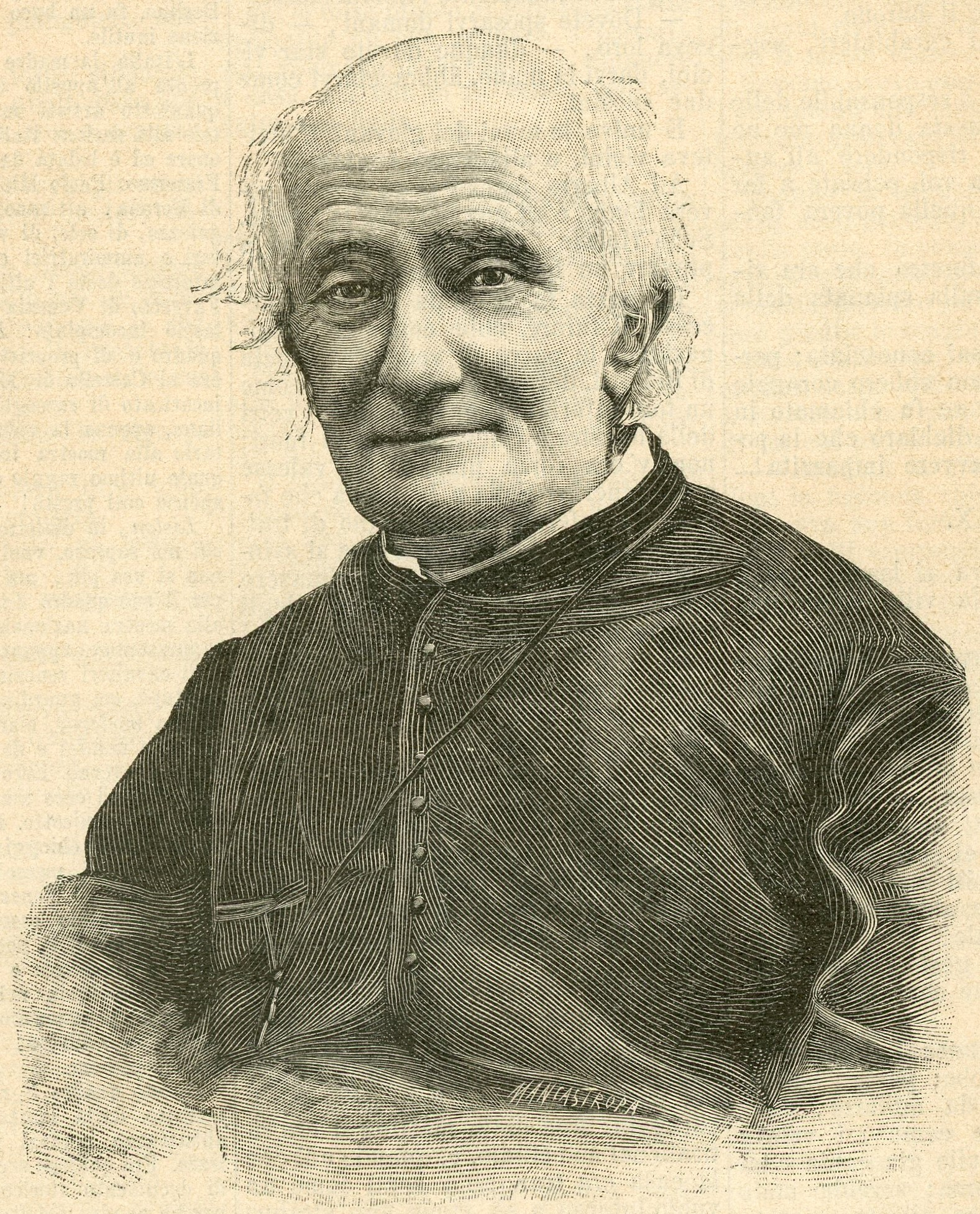
- Carlo Maria Curci
- Born: 4 September 1810; Naples, Kingdom of Naples
- Died: 8 June 1891 (aged 80); Florence, Kingdom of Italy
- Occupations: Jesuit; Scholar; Journalist
- Parent(s): Vincenzo Curci and Costanza Curci (née De Ferrante)
- Writing career
- Language: Italian
- Period: 1845–1891
- Genre: Treatise

Ecclesiastical career
- Religion: Christianity
- Church: Catholic Church
- Ordained: 1 November 1836

Carlo Maria Curci, SJ (1810, in Naples – June 8, 1891, in Florence) was an Italian theologian from Naples. A Jesuit from the age of 16, he was expelled from the Society of Jesus in 1884 after spending the preceding decade challenging perceived political and spiritual problems within the Catholic Church. After his expulsion, he was financially supported by Cardinal Henry Edward Manning. He was re-admitted to the Society of Jesus a few months before his death in 1891.

== Biography ==
Curci joined the Society of Jesus in 1826, and was devoted to the education and care of the poor and prisoners. Curci became one of the first editors of the Jesuit periodical, La Civiltà Cattolica. He later wrote for Vincenzo Gioberti, Antonio Rosmini-Serbati and other advocates for reform; Cerci wrote a preface to Gioberti's Primato (1843), but dissented from his Prolegomena.

In the 1870s, Curci delivered a course on Christian philosophy in Florence and published several Scriptural works. In his edition of the New Testament, Curci harshly criticized Italian clergy for neglecting to study Scripture.

In the meantime, he began to attack the Vatican for its role in politics. In his work "The Modern Conflict between the Church and Italy" (Il Moderno Dissidio tra la Chiesa e l'Italia, published in 1878) he called for the separation of church and state in Italy. This was followed by "The New Italy and The Old Zealots" (La Nuova Italia ed i Vecchi Zelanti, published in 1881), another attack on the Vatican policy; and by his "Royal Vatican" (Vaticano Regio, published in 1883), in which he accuses the Vatican of selling sacred objects and declares that secularism came from the false principles accepted by the Curia.

Curci's work in Naples eventually drew him to Christian Socialism. He was condemned in Rome, and in a letter to The Times (September 10, 1884), he delivered an account of his disobedience to the decrees of the Roman Congregation, stating: "I am a dutiful son of the Church who hesitates to obey an order of his mother because he does not see the maternal authority in it."

Curci was expelled from the Society of Jesus and suspended from the Church. During this time, Cardinal Henry Edward Manning put his purse at Curci's disposal. He eventually accepted the decrees against him and retracted all of his statements contrary to the ideology of the Church. Curci later retired and spent the remainder of his life in Florence. A few months before his death, he was readmitted to the Jesuit Society.
