= Zoe Tavarelli =

Italian actress

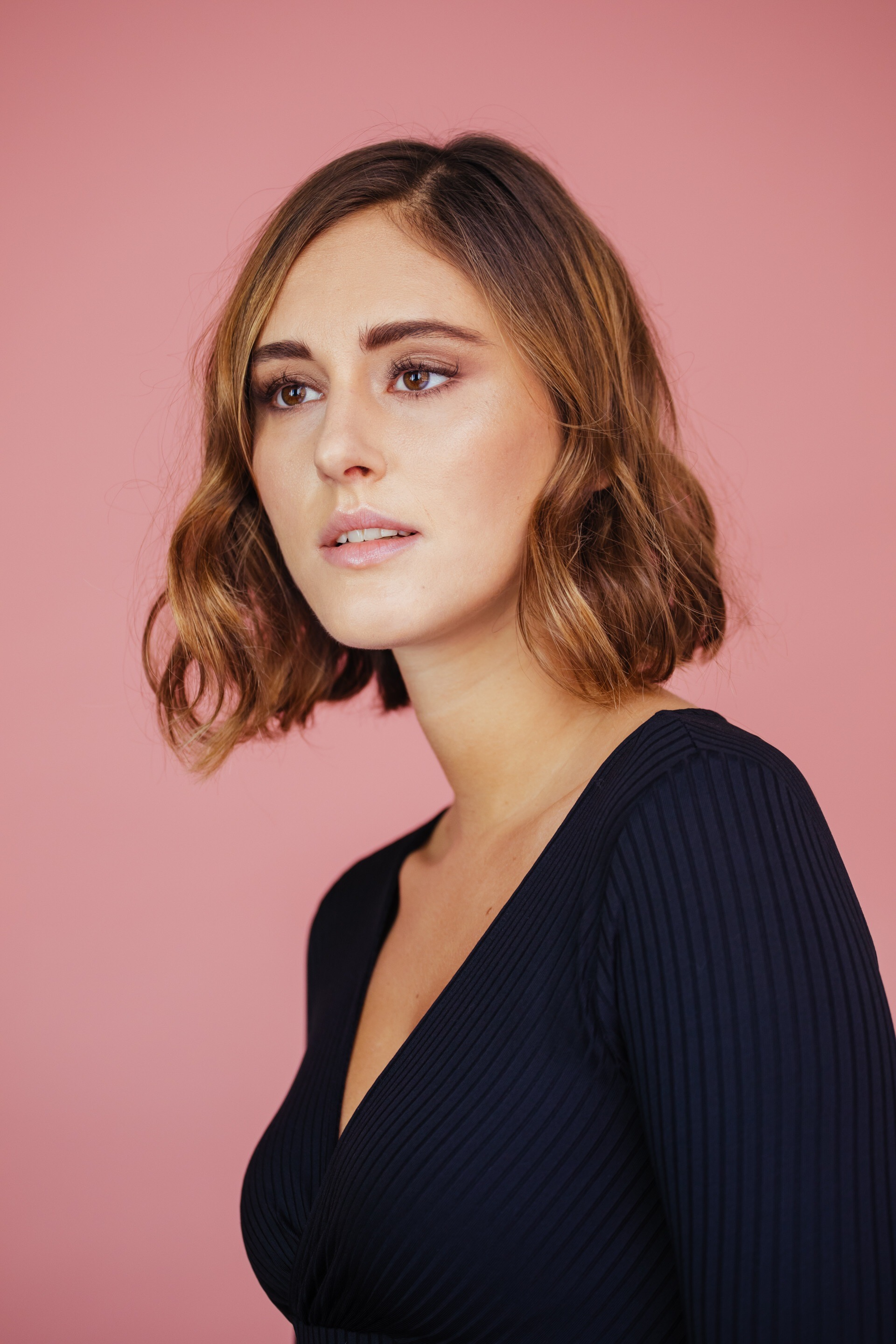
- Born: January 3, 1996 (age 30); Turin, Italy
- Occupation: Actress

Zoe Tavarelli (born January 3, 1996) is an Italian film and television actress.

== Filmography ==
=== Film ===
Year	Title	Role	Notes
2004	Se Devo Essere Sincera	Elena	
2006	Piedi Nudi	Anna	Short Film
2006	Don't Make Any Plans for Tonight	Elena Sciortino	
2014	Romeo & Juliet	Juliet	Short Film
2016	The Lost Film Series	n/a	
2016	Independence Day	The Girl	Short Film
2019	If We Have Next Life	Rachel	Short Film
2021	Boys	Pamela	
2022	Umberto Eco - La Biblioteca del Mondo	Zoe	

=== Television ===
Year	Title	Role	Notes
2007	Maria Montessori - Una vita per i bambini	Aurora	Television Film
2012-2015	The Young Montalbano	Giulia	1x02, 2x06
2017	Maltese - Il romanzo del Commissario	Rosalia Nitto	1x04
2018	Manny's Garage Sale: A Hitchcock Knot	Nicole	1 episode
2020	Io ti Cercherò	Martina Camilli	8 episodes

== Awards and nominations ==
- 2008 Piemonte Movie Award for Best Leading Actress – Piedi Nudi; Won
- 2018 LA shorts awards Bronze Award – Diminuendo; Won
