= La Civiltà Cattolica =

Jesuit-run magazine

Coordinates: 41°54′20.67″N 12°29′7.78″E

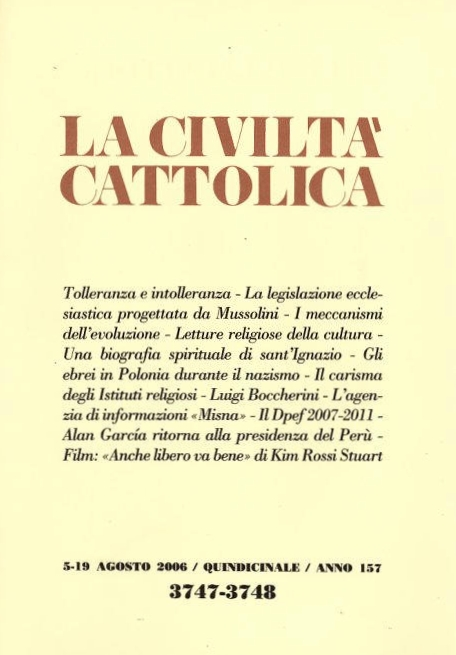
- Cover of the issue of 5 August 2006.
- Director: Antonio Spadaro SJ
- Categories: national press
- Frequency: Twice a month
- Circulation: 15,000
- Publisher: Society of Jesus
- Founder: Carlo Maria Curci
- First issue: 6 April 1850
- Country: Italy
- Based in: Rome
- Language: Italian
- Website: www.laciviltacattolica.it
- ISSN: 0009-8167

La Civiltà Cattolica (Italian for Catholic Civilization) is a periodical published by the Jesuits in Rome, Italy. It has been published continuously since 1850 and is among the oldest of Italian Catholic periodicals. All of the journal's articles are the collective responsibility of the entire "college" of the magazine's writers even if published under a single author's name. It is the only one to be directly revised by the Secretariat of State of the Holy See and to receive its approval before being published.

The periodical is headquartered since 1951 in the Villa Malta (Pincian Hill) situated in Via F. Crispi, Rome.

In more recent times the magazine has advocated reaching out to children, teens, and young people who use and interact with social media (Facebook, Twitter, Skype, YouTube, etc., on devices such as the iPod and iPad) to an intense degree, and find ways to foster their faith life through interior meditation, including, among other exercises, the Spiritual Exercises of Saint Ignatius of Loyola, the Jesuits' founder.

== Mission ==
The journal seeks to promote a catholic culture, thought, and civilization in the modern world. Its founder, Fr. Carlo Maria Curci, wrote that it brings "the idea and the movement of civilization to that Catholic concept which it seems to have divorced from for about three centuries." Although the magazine aims to reach a wide audience and be understood by all, it intends to treat issues with scientific rigour.

In his 2006 address to the college of journalists at the journal Pope Benedict XVI noted:

Here then, is where the mission of a cultural journal such as La Civiltà Cattolica fits in: active participation in the contemporary cultural debate, both to propose and at the same time to spread the Christian faith in a serious way. Its purpose is both to present it clearly and in fidelity to the Magisterium of the Church, and to defend without polemics the truth that is sometimes distorted by unfounded accusations directed at the Ecclesial Community. I would like to point out the Second Vatican Council as a beacon on the path that La Civiltà Cattolica is called to take.

== History ==
=== Founding of the periodical and Papal influence ===
The periodical was founded by the Jesuit priest Carlo Maria Curci, who "felt the need for an exposition, at the highest intellectual level, of the point of view of the Papacy in matters religious and political." During the years of the risorgimento, the Church was physically and intellectually "in a state of siege" and many thought the undertaking "too hazardous," but Pius IX himself "insisted that Curci was right that the flood of anti-Papal propaganda [from liberals, Protestants, and others] could only be met by a reasoned statement of the Papal case..." Other sources cite the desire to defend "catholic civilization" against a perceived growing influence of liberals and freemasons. The first issue was released in Naples on 6 April 1850 in Italian (rather than Latin), although due to censorship by the House of Bourbon the editorial office was transferred to Rome that same year. Upon moving to Rome, the periodical became the unofficial voice of the Holy See.

The bimonthly journal was published through papal funding by order of Pope Pius IX and, according to Papal critic Susan Zucotti, readers recognised it as representing contemporary Vatican opinion However, Catholic writer E.E.Y. Hales wrote that "it was not an official organ of the Papal government, indeed the Pope often expressed the keenest displeasure with what it said. Curci [the paper's first editor] was independent-minded; so were his collaborators..." Papal influence was demonstrated by the dismissal of Curci by Pius IX in 1875.

A special 50th anniversary edition of the journal asserted "More than a simple journal [La Civiltà Cattolica] is an institution desired and created by the Holy See and placed at it's [sic] exclusive service for the defense of the Sacred doctrine and the rights of the Church". During the papacy of Pius X, the editor of the journal began to be appointed by the pope or with his approval. During the 1920s and 30s, the journal has been described as "extremely authoritative...because of its tight ties with the [Vatican] Secretary of State." In 1924, Pope Pius XI wrote: "from the journal's very beginning the authors set for themselves that sacred and immutable duty of defending the rights of the Apostolic See and the Catholic faith, and struggling against the poison that the doctrine of liberalism had injected into the very veins of States and societies.." The historian Richard Webster described its influence in 1938 as reflecting the views of the Pontiff. During the papacy of Pius XII, all articles were reviewed prior to publication by the Secretariat of State.

In his 1999 address to the editorial staff to mark the 150th anniversary of journal, Pope John Paul II observed:

Reviewing the past 150 years of your journal, we note a great variety of positions due to changing historical circumstances and to the personalities of the individual writers. However, in the broad, complex panorama of religious, social and political events that from 1850 to today have involved the Church and Italy, one constant can always be seen in the volumes of La Civiltà Cattolica: the total loyalty, even if sometimes difficult, to the teachings and directives of the Holy See and love and veneration for the person of the Pope.

Pope Pius IX supported the journal in order to have an effective means of defending Catholic thought. Cardinal Giacomo Antonelli also lent support. The Superior General of the Jesuits, Father Joannes Philippe Roothaan (1783–1853), was more cautious. He warned that Jesuit involvement in political issues might damage the Jesuit reputation. The periodical initially had a polemical tone. This was typical of Christian apologetics in the 19th century.

Early editors include:

- Luigi Taparelli D'Azeglio (1793–1862), philosopher of law.
- Matteo Liberatore (1810–1892), scholar of Thomist philosophy. Liberatore was a forerunner of Catholic social teaching. Pope Leo XIII asked him to outline the papal encyclical Rerum novarum.
- Antonio Bresciani (1798–1862), scholar of literature.
- Giovanni Battista Pianciani (1784–1862), scholar of Natural science.

As students, Jesuit priests Carlo Piccirillo (1821–1888) and Giuseppe Oreglia di Santo Stefano (1823–1895) contributed to the magazine.

On 12 February 1866, Pope Pius IX issued the Apostolic Brief Gravissimum Supremi with which he formed a College of Writers from those working on the journal. The special statute of the College of Writers was again confirmed by Pope Leo XIII in 1890.

When Italian troops entered Rome in 1870, publication of the periodical was suspended for three months. It was taken up again in Florence in 1871, where it stayed until returning to Rome in 1876.

Until 1933, the writers were anonymous. From that year on, the articles were signed.

=== La Civiltà Cattolica in the 19th century ===
La Civiltà Cattolica contributed to the Syllabus of Errors, the First Vatican Council (1869–1870) and to the task of restoring Thomist philosophy, which flourished during the pontificate of Pope Leo XIII (1878–1903).

The journal held an anti-evolutionistic position, and was often the main source for Vatican thinking on the issue, as no direct statements were made. However, the opening in 1998 of the Archive of the Congregation for the Doctrine of the Faith (previously called the Holy Office or the Congregation of the Index) revealed that on many crucial points and in specific cases, the Vatican position had been less dogmatic than the journal had suggested at the time.

The journal held a prominent role in the Italian political arena. It reviewed the events which led to the unification of Italy and the Roman Question. After the Capture of Rome in 1870, the journal opposed the liberalist political party and modernism.

During the late 1800s, the paper also published several antisemitic articles. According to Jewish writer Pinchas Lapide, the paper, for example, re-awoke the myth that Jews ritualistically killed Christian children to use the victim's blood in their bread: "In spite of six papal condemnations of the blood legend and in spite of Pope Innocent III's explicit command ('Nor shall anyone accuse them of using human blood in their religious rites. ... [W]e strictly forbid the recurrence of such a thing') the order ... published, between February 1881 and December 1882, a series of articles [which contained such assertions as]: 'Every year the Hebrews crucify a child ... [and] in order that the blood be effective, the child must die in torment' (21 Jan. 1882, p. 214)."

=== La Civiltà Cattolica and the rise of Fascism ===
In the early 20th century, the journal promoted the development of a Catholic ruling class. (A decline had occurred particularly after the Non Expedit, a papal policy promulgated in the late 19th century that discouraged Catholics from taking an active part in the political process.) After the signing of the Lateran Treaty in 1929, Father Enrico Rosa, the editor of the journal met with Alleanza Nazionale, (an anti-fascist) group of Catholic monarchists. In 1936, Father Antonio Messineo (1897–1968) published an article in La Civiltà Cattolica about the legitimacy of colonialism. At the time, Italy was annexing Ethiopia in opposition to the League of Nations.

In 1937 the journal published the letter of the Spanish bishops dated 1 July 1937 dealing with the civil war. This letter, supporting the dictatorial movement of general Francisco Franco was ignored by the Osservatore Romano.

In September 1938 the journal published details of the new Italian race laws which revoked the citizenship of anyone "of Jewish race" who had acquired Italian citizenship after 1918, ordering those who were not citizens to leave the country within six months. The article provided the full text dealing with the expulsion of Jewish teachers and children from schools, Jews from academic occupations and, without comment, noted a government clarification that the new laws applied also to those whose parents were both Jews and no matter if they professed a religion other than Judaism. The journal dealt with the fascist regime's use of a three-part series of articles published by the journal in 1890 on "the Jewish question in Europe" and distinguished between the fascist and Catholic approaches to "the Jewish problem. It noted that the journal's 1890 campaign was inspired "by the spectacle of the Judaic invasion and of Judaic arrogance" but that it would be anachronistic to call these articles fascist since the term didn't exist then. After making distinctions between the Church's and fascist approach to the "Jewish problem", in particular fascists using biological arguments which were contrary to Church teaching, the journal concluded that the battle against the Jews "is to be understood as a struggle inspired solely by the need for legitimate defense of Christian people against a foreign nation in the nations where they live and against the sworn enemy of their well-being. This suggests [the need for] measures to render such peoples harmless." (emphasis appears in the original journal article)

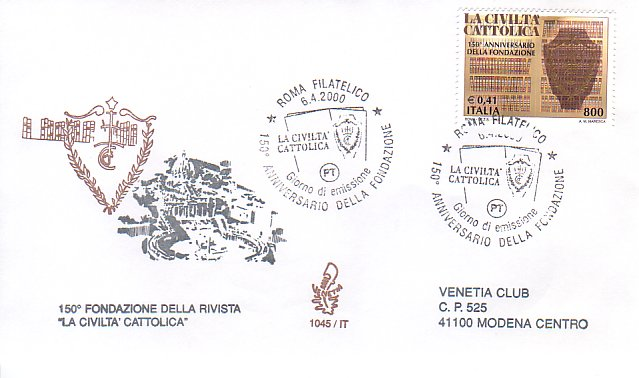
Italian stamp commemorating the 150th anniversary of the Civiltà Cattolica

In 1938 Fr. Enrico Rosa published an article in which he analyzed some of the criticisms made to the periodical by a study on the Jewish question. Fr. Rosa negated the accusations according to which the periodical favoured two measures against Jews in 1890: the confiscation of property and the expulsion from Italy; Fr. Rosa affirmed that neither of the two are admissible by the Christian spirit, and that the periodical did not sustain them, though he did admit that the force of the controversy in that historical moment did not help to express the positions in a very clear way. In this same article Fr. Rosa warned against the rising fascist antisemitism. In the same year however, the periodical commented favorably on the fascist Manifesto of Race, trying to prove a difference between this and the nazi manifesto.

Fascist leader Roberto Farinacci saw a tie between fascist antisemitic policies and articles published in the journal. In particular he cited an 1890 article from the journal in which he reports the Jews are described as "a depraved race" and "an enemy of mankind" and calling "for the annulment of all laws that give the Jews political and civil equality". Farinacci reported that another journal article, which had just been published a few months before, asserted that "the Judaic religion was profoundly corrupted" and had warned "that Judaism still aims for world domination." Farinacci also compared some policies of the Jesuits to the Aryan racism of the Nazis. Farinacci concluded that the Fascists had in the Jesuits "constant precursors and masters in the Jewish question...and if we can be faulted for anything, it is for not having applied all of their instransigence in our dealing with the Jews". Il Regime Fascista in 1938 published an article which asserted "even though we ourselves have never felt such cruelty and hatred...Both for Italy and Germany there is still much to learn from the disciples of Jesus, and we must admit that both in its planning and in its execution, Fascism is still far from the excessive severity of the people of Civilita Cattolica". David Kertzer questions the sincerity of Farinacci and other fascist leaders who cited the Church to justify their own racial laws but in his view they could only have done so because the Church had "indeed helped lay the groundwork for the Fascist racial laws."

=== La Civiltà Cattolica and Communism ===
In the second post-war era La Civiltà Cattolica cautioned against the dangers of communism in Italy and in the Eastern European countries.

In the journal, Father Riccardo Lombardi (1908–1979), encouraged Catholics organise to oppose the Left in the campaign of 1948.

There was disagreement in the College of Writers as to whether Catholics should choose their own political alliances. The editor, Father James Martegnani (1902–1981), favoured a right-wing coalition between the Common Man's Front, the Italian Social Movement and part of the Christian Democracy party. Martegnani and Monsignor Roberto Ronca (1901–1978), the Bishop of Pompei, created Civiltà Italica, a Christian political movement.

However, the arguments of Alcide De Gasperi (1881–1954) represented by Father Anthony Messineo and by Father Salvatore Lener (1907–1983), prevailed.

The stemma of the Company of Jesus

Some Catholic historians believe La Civiltà Cattolica later denounced the totalitarian states of the 1900s. Others do not agree. In the late 20th century Father Robert Graham published articles which sought to refute the accusations relating to the "silence" of Pope Pius XII during the Holocaust.

=== La Civiltà Cattolica after the Second Vatican Council ===
==== Renewed outlook ====
La Civiltà Cattolica documented and reported the details of the Second Vatican Council (1962–1965). Some writers participated as experts. After the Council, the journal took on a conciliatory tone which promoted a dialogue with the modern world, whilst holding to the beliefs of Roman Catholicism. The Papacy of Pope John Paul II influenced La Civiltà Cattolica with a renewed missionary perspective, with revived apologetical articles, and with the task of promoting the New Evangelization.

==== In the Italian political arena ====
At the time of the Historic Compromise, the journal called for the reestablishment of the Christian Democracy. Secularism was spreading through Italy, witnessed in the referendum defeats on issues such as divorce and abortion. Catholics were becoming a minority thus weakening their political strength.

== Editors ==
- Carlo Maria Curci (1850–1853)
- Giuseppe Calvetti (24 October 1853 – 1855)
- Giuseppe Paria (2 January 1855 – 1856)
- Carlo Maria Curci (14 September 1856 – 1861)
- Matteo Liberatore (16 March 1861 – 1865)
- Giuseppe Oreglia di Santo Stefano (1865–1868)
- Carlo Piccirillo (1868–1874)
- Francesco Berardinelli (1874–1891)
- Ruggero Freddi (13 September 1891 – 1892)
- Alessandro Gallerani (15 December 1892 – 1905)
- Salvatore Brandi (3 December 1905 – 1913)
- Giuseppe Chiaudiano (5 October 1913 – 1915)
- Enrico Rosa (21 April 1915 – 1931)
- Felice Rinaldi (3 August 1931 – 1939)
- Giacomo Martegnani (15 July 1939 – 1955)
- Calogero Gliozzo (25 March 1955 – 1959)
- Roberto Tucci (24 July 1959 – 1973)
- Bartolomeo Sorge (25 September 1973 – 1985)
- Gianpaolo Salvini (31 July 1985 – 2011)
- Antonio Spadaro (1 October 2011 – present)

== Anti-Judaism/antisemitism ==
In The Origins of Totalitarianism, Hannah Arendt described Civilta Cattolica as "for decades the most outspokenly antisemitic" magazines in the world, which "carried anti-Jewish propaganda long before Italy went fascist." The Second Vatican Council held in the 1960s led the Roman Catholic Church to renounce charges of deicide and other negative views of Jews that had commonly appeared in the pages of Civilta Cattolica and other publications. Negative liturgical references to the Jews were expurgated, accompanied by a complete revision of what children were taught about Jews in school lessons and catechetical works.

According to Zuccotti (2000), antisemitism based on racial differences has rarely featured in Roman Catholicism. During the 1920s and the 1930s, racial antisemitism was condemned by Church spokesmen. Pinchas Lapide, however, likened the Jesuits to Himmler's SS because in the era of Hitler both were closed to people within certain degrees of Jewish descent (a requirement that was dropped in 1946). Lapide further notes that the journal was particularly outspoken in its hatred of the Jews, publishing numerous articles on the subject, and that most of the tenets that are a feature of modern antisemitism can be found in journal's articles dating from the 1890s. They continued to support accusations made against Alfred Dreyfus even after his innocence had been legally established.

La Civiltà Cattolica condemned antisemitism based on race. It did promote religious discrimination in the belief that Jews were responsible for deicide and ritual murder and had undue control of society. The journal did not promote violence against Jews.

In 1909, Hitler visited Vienna to "study the Jewish problem" under the guidance of the zealot Roman Catholic Karl Lueger. Lueger was Vienna's mayor. He was also leader of the "rabidly anti-Semitic" Christian Social Party. Hitler greatly admired Lueger. His first antisemitic pamphlets were published by the Christian Socialists which reprinted several articles from La Civiltà Cattolica. Lapide (1967) suggests Hitler may have been influenced by "La Civiltà Cattolica". In 1914 the journal described Jews as drinking blood as if it was milk in the context of killing Christian children. Der Stürmer printed a special edition dedicated to "Jewish ritual murder" which included extensive quotations from La Civiltà Cattolica.

A 1920 article in journal described Jews as "the filthy element" who "were avid for money" and who wanted to "proclaim the communist republic tomorrow."

As Hitler escalated his anti-Jewish policies during the 1930s, the journal, according to Zuccotti (2000), not only failed to downplay its particular brand of anti-Judaism but repeated it more often. In 1934, Enrico Rosa wrote two reviews of "the notorious German anti-Semitic manual" (Handbuch der Judenfrage). According to Zuccotti (2000), Rosa found the authors guilty only of exaggeration and that the authors were applauded for equating Jews with Freemasons, describing Jews as the "relentless irreconcilable enemies of Christ and of Christianity, particularly of integral and pure Christianity, the Catholicism of the Roman Church". In 1936, the journal reported that "if not all, still not a few Jews constitute a grave and permanent danger to society" because of their economic and political influence. The reviewer opined that the book's three options for dealing with "the Jewish problem", i.e. assimilation, Zionism and ghettoization, were not feasible, thus suggesting that God must have reasons for placing Jews in Christian societies.

In 1936 an article quoted a fellow Jesuit to prove that Jews were "uniquely endowed with the qualities of parasites. A series of articles in 1937 expanded on the theme of Jews who were "a foreign body that irritates and provokes the reaction of the organism it has contaminated." In 1937, "La Civiltà Cattolica" reviewed a book by Hilaire Belloc summarising Belloc's view that the "Jewish problem" could only be solved by "elimination or segregation" (elimination did not include destruction). The reviewer rejected Belloc's option of expulsion (it being contrary to Christian charity) and also elimination by "a friendly and gentle manner, through absorption" since in his opinion it had "been shown to be historically unachievable." Zuccotti notes the reviewer didn't dispute Belloc's proposal for "friendly segregation" based on Jews having a separate nationality but places it in the context of rights denied to the Jews when Mussolini imposed anti-Jewish laws in 1938. Zuccotti (2000) describes the language used in dealing with the "Jewish problem" as "ominous in retrospect". During the first half of 1937, the journal continued to run denunciations against the Jews but in the aftermath of the encyclical Mit brennender Sorge Father Mario Barbera (who had authored some of these strident attacks) for a brief period during the summer of 1937 changed course and, whilst repeating familiar accusations, called on Catholics to remove from their hearts any form of antisemitism and anything that might offend or humiliate Jews. He would return to the older style of warnings a few months later. The journal in 1938 wrote that Hungary could be saved from the Jews, who were "disastrous for the religious, moral, and social life of the Hungarian people", only if the government "forbids [Jewish] foreigners to enter the country". In September 1938, three weeks after the Italian government marked all foreign Jews for expulsion and Jews were being harried and terrorised, the journal published and article asserting that "anti-Christian sectarians" who had granted Jews equality had brought together freemasonry and Judaism "in persecuting the Catholic Church and elevating the Jewish race over Christians as much in hidden power as in manifest opulence." In 1941 and 1942 the journal accused the Jews of being "Christ Killers" and being involved with ritual murder. Michael Phayer notes that the journal continued to publish "slander about the Jews even while they were being murdered en masse by German mobile killing squads.

In 1971 Emmanuel Beeri (Encyclopaedia Judaica) noted that from the 1950s onwards Civiltà's attitude became more dispassionate in conformity with the Vatican's moves toward reconciliation between Jews and the Catholic Church.

In his history of La Civiltà Cattolica (2000), Father Giuseppe De Rosa expressed regret at the journals century-long campaign against the Jews and regret that the journal only changed its stance through the influence of the Second Vatican Council which sought reconciliation. (see Nostra aetate)

De Rosa drew a distinction between antisemitism based on race, which he believes the journal never sanctioned, and anti-Judaism based on religious factors which he acknowledges the journal did promote. David Kertzer noted a disturbing trend in De Rosa's history of the journal, and also in We Remember the Shoah, that seeks to distance the Church from the Holocaust. Kertzer pointed out that the anti-Judaism that the Church describes involved denunciation of the Jews not purely on religious grounds but also for socio-political reasons and thus says "the whole carefully constructed anti-Semitic/anti-Judaism distinction evaporates". Kertzer subsequently reported that as part of the Vatican's attack on his book Unholy War, Civilita cattolica "dipped deep into the well of anti-Semitism to defend the Vatican from any involvement in the rise of modern anti-Semitism".

== See also ==
- Luigi Taparelli
- Periodical publication
- Holy See

== Bibliography ==
- Artigas, Mariano; Glick, Thomas F.; Martínez, Rafael A. (2006). Negotiating Darwin: the Vatican confronts evolution, 1877-1902. Baltimore, Md: Johns Hopkins University Press. ISBN 0-8018-8389-X.
- Pollard, John F. (2005). Money and the Rise of the Modern Papacy: Financing the Vatican, 1850–1950. New York: Cambridge University Press. ISBN 978-0521812047.
- Zuccotti, Susan (2000). Under His Very Windows: The Vatican and the Holocaust in Italy. New Haven: Yale University Press. ISBN 978-0-300-09310-0.
- Lapide, Pinchas (1967). Three Popes and the Jews. New York: Hawthorn Books. OCLC 236293.
- Kertzer, David I. (2003). Unholy war: the Vatican's role in the rise of modern anti-semitism. London: Pan. ISBN 978-0-330-39049-1.
- Wills, Garry (2000). Structures of Deceit: Papal Sin. London: Darton, Longman & Todd. ISBN 0-232-52389-4.
- Maryks, Robert A. (2009). The Jesuit Order as a Synagogue of Jews:Jesuits of Jewish Ancestry and Purity-of-Blood Laws in the Early Society of Jesus. Studies in Medieval and Reformation Traditions. Brill. ISBN 978-9004179813.
- Phayer, Michael (2001). The Catholic Church and the Holocaust, 1930-1965. Bloomington: Indiana University Press. ISBN 0-253-21471-8.
