= Edward Heneage Dering =

English novelist (1826–1892)

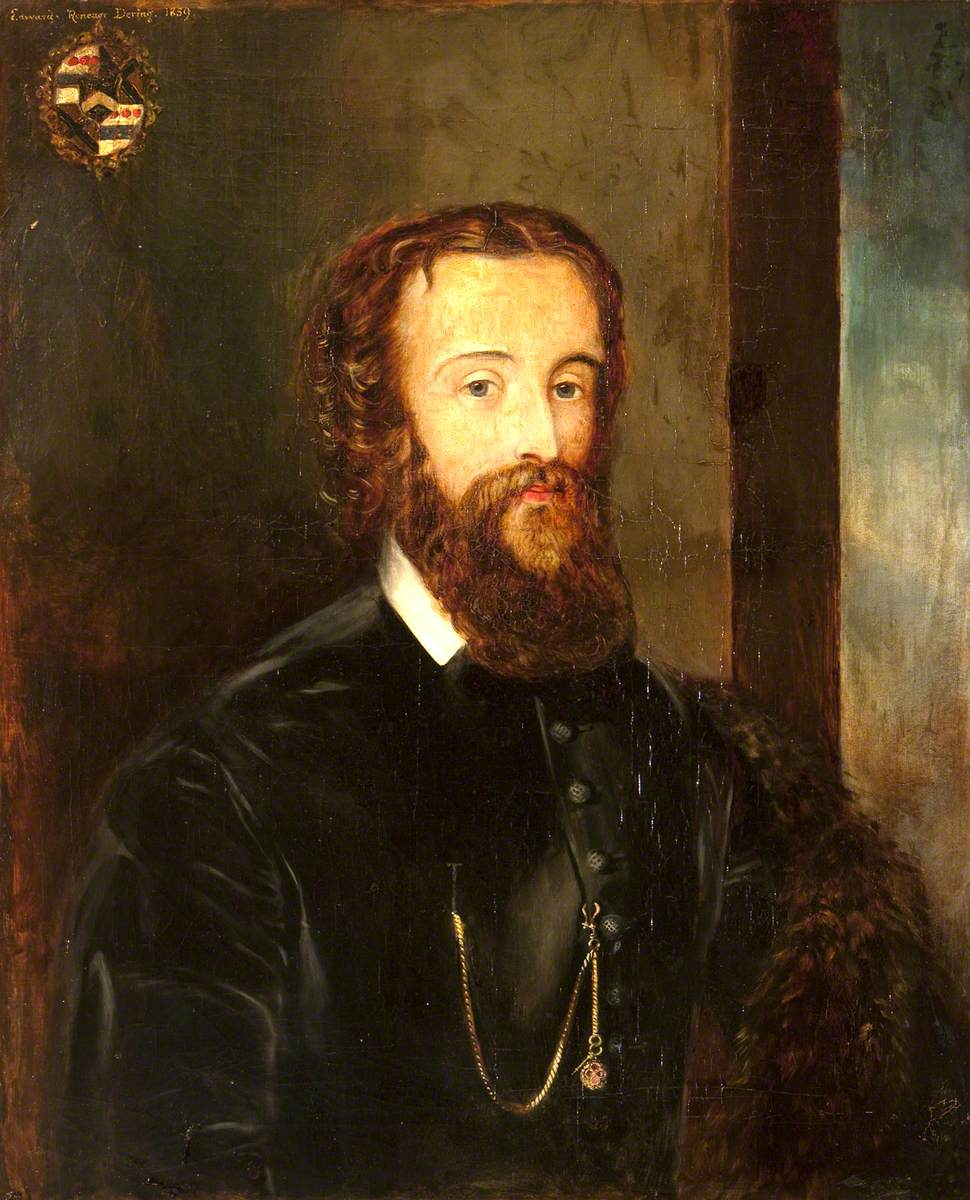
1859 portrait of Dering by Rebecca Dulcibella Orpen

Edward Heneage Dering (1826–1892) was an English novelist of the Victorian era. He is largely remembered today as a member of "The Quartet" at Baddesley Clinton, with marriages to two artistic women.

== Biography ==
Edward Heneage Dering was born in 1826. He was the younger son of Cholmeley Edward John Dering, rector of Pluckley, Kent, and prebendary of St Paul's Cathedral. He joined the 68th Foot as an ensign in 1844, and in 1848 was a lieutenant in the Coldstream Guards. Having caught malaria in Italy, he sold out his commission and left the army in 1851.

In 1859 Dering married fellow author Lady Georgiana Chatterton. Dering converted to Catholicism in 1865 From 1869, the couple lived at Baddesley Clinton with Georgiana's niece Rebecca Dulcibella Orpen and her husband Marmion Edward Ferrers. While living there, they paid for improvements to the house and paid off mortgages taken out on the estate.

Lady Georgiana became a Catholic convert in 1875, according to John Sutherland under the influence of her husband's view of Catholicism in Sherborne, published that year. She died at Baddesley Clinton in 1876 and two years later Dering published Memoirs of Georgiana, Lady Chatterton

Dering continued to live at Baddesley Clinton, chaperoned by a Catholic priest after the death of Rebecca's husband in 1884; in 1885 the couple were married. Edward was responsible for more improvements to the house, including a new service wing in 1890.

== Death and legacy ==
Dering died at Baddesley Clinton in 1892 and much of his personal library, along with those of his wives, remains in the house today. The collections there also include several portraits of Dering painted by Rebecca Dering, including "The philosopher's morning walk", which shows him in his favoured old-fashioned clothes in front of the moat at Baddesley Clinton.

== Works ==
Dering published novels including:

- Lethelier (1860)
- A Great Sensation (1862)
- Grey's Court (1865)
- Florence Danby (1868)
- Sherborne: or, The House at the Four Ways (1875)
- Freville Chase (1880)
- The Lady of Raven's Combe (1891)
- The Ban of Mablethorpe (1894).

These works were generally poorly reviewed. The Chieftains's Daughter (1870) was a volume of verse.

Dering concerned himself with neo-Thomist thought. He published English translations of works by the Jesuit philosopher Matteo Liberatore. Works against theosophy were:

- Esoteric Buddhism (1887) criticised the works of Alfred Percy Sinnett.
- The Philosopher of Rovereto (1888), criticism of the posthumously-published Teosofia of Antonio Rosmini.
