= Roberto d'Azeglio =

Italian painter

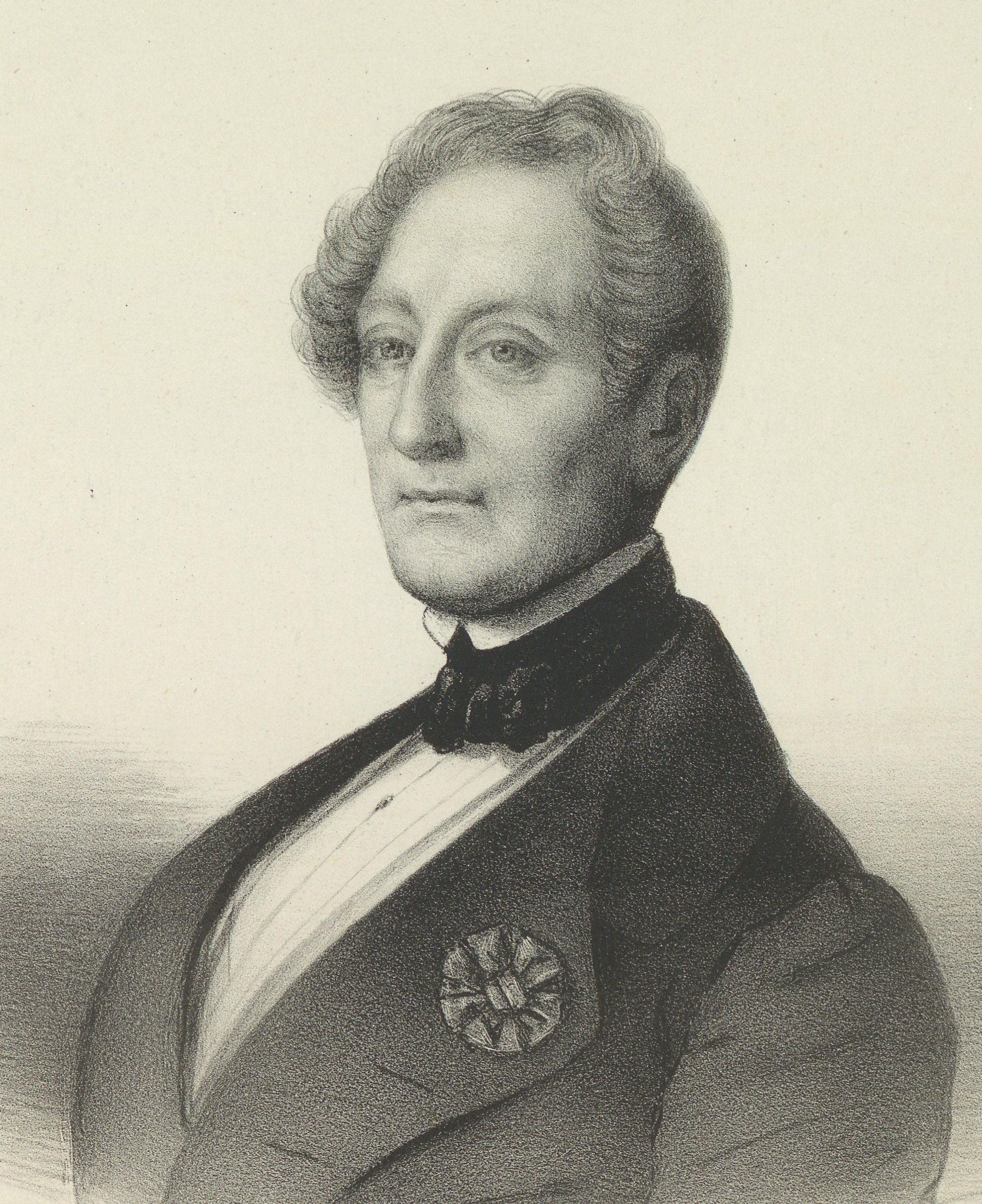
Roberto d’Azeglio.

Marquis Roberto d’Azeglio (1790–1862) was an Italian painter.

== Life ==
Born in Turin, he painted historical works in the manner of Gaudenzio Ferrari. He was the son of Marquis Cesare Taparelli d'Azeglio and brother of Marquis Massimo d'Azeglio and Luigi Taparelli. He became director of the Turin Gallery, and wrote several books on art. He died in his birthplace. The diplomat Vittorio Emanuele Taparelli d'Azeglio was his son.

== Sources ==
- Bryan, Michael (1889). Walter Armstrong; Robert Edmund Graves (eds.). Dictionary of Painters and Engravers, Biographical and Critical. Vol. II L-Z. London: George Bell and Sons. p. 551.
