= Cesare Taparelli d'Azeglio =

Italian soldier and Catholic writer

Taparelli d'Azeglio coat of arms

Cesare Taparelli, marchese d'Azeglio (10 February 1763 – 26 November 1830), was an Italian soldier, monarchist and writer, a leading figure of the Catholic counter-Enlightenment in Piedmont-Sardinia. He wrote for the first Catholic journal in Italy, L'Ape. Alessandro Manzoni addressed his letter Sul romanticismo to him.

Taparelli was born in Turin to Roberto Taparelli, conte di Lagnasco, and Giustina Genolla. In 1774, he joined the Royal Sardinian Army. In 1784, he experienced a religious turn. In 1788, he married Cristina Morozzo di Bianzè, with whom he had three sons who survived to adulthood: Roberto, Luigi and Massimo. All their other children died young. Taparelli died in Genoa, where had accompanied his ailing wife.

== Bibliography ==
- Verucci, Guido (1962). "Azeglio, Cesare Taparelli marchese di". Dizionario Biografico degli Italiani (in Italian). Vol. 4: Arconati–Bacaredda. Rome: Istituto dell'Enciclopedia Italiana. OCLC 883370.
- Millar, Eileen Anne (2002). "D'Azeglio, Cesare Taparelli". In Peter Hainsworth; David Robey (eds.). The Oxford Companion to Italian Literature. Oxford University Press.
