= Luigi Taparelli =

Italian Jesuit philosopher and scholar (1793–1862)

Monsignor Luigi Taparelli SJ
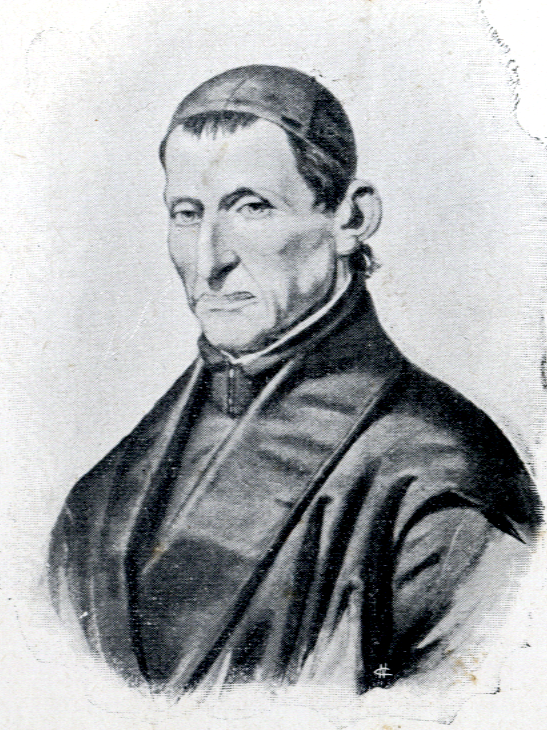
- Illustration of Taparelli
- Born: 24 November 1793; Turin, Piedmont-Sardinia (present-day Italy)
- Died: 21 September 1862 (aged 68); Rome, Papal States (present-day Italy)
- Father: Cesare Taparelli d'Azeglio

Education
- Education: University of Turin

Philosophical work
- Era: 19th century
- Region: Western philosophy; Italian philosophy
- School: Thomism
- Institutions: Oblates of the Virgin Mary; Society of Jesus
- Main interests: Religion; sociology
- Notable ideas: Social justice; subsidiarity

Luigi Taparelli SJ (born Prospero Taparelli d'Azeglio; 24 November 1793 – 2 September 1862) was an Italian scholar of the Society of Jesus who coined the term social justice and elaborated the principles of subsidiarity as part of his natural law theory of just social order. He was the brother of the Italian statesman Massimo d'Azeglio.

== Biography ==
His father, Cesare Taparelli, was at one time ambassador of Victor Emmanuel I of Sardinia to the Holy See, and his brother, Massimo, was one of the Italian ministers of State. Cesare was a member of the associations Amicizia cristiana and Amicizia cattolica, and a main contributor to L'Ape, the first Catholic journal in Italy. Luigi was educated under the Piarists at Siena and in the Atheneo of Turin. He attended the military School of St Cyr at Paris for some months, but he was not destined to be a soldier. He entered the Society of Jesus at Rome, 12 Nov. 1814. He was the first rector of the Roman College after its restoration to the Jesuits by Leo XII. He taught philosophy for sixteen years at Palermo.

Taparelli cofounded the journal Civiltà Cattolica in 1850 and wrote for it for twelve years. He was particularly concerned with the problems arising from the Industrial Revolution. He was a proponent of reviving the philosophical school of Thomism, and his social teachings influenced Pope Leo XIII's 1891 encyclical, Rerum novarum (On the Condition of the Working Classes).

In 1825, he became convinced that the philosophy of Thomas Aquinas needed to be revived, thinking that the subjective philosophy of René Descartes leads to dramatic errors in morality and politics. He reasoned that whereas different opinions on the natural sciences have no effect on nature, unclear metaphysical ideas about humanity and society can lead to social chaos.

The Catholic Church had not yet developed a clear philosophical view regarding the great social changes that were appearing in the early nineteenth century in Europe, which led to much confusion among the ecclesiastical hierarchy and laity. In response to this problem, Taparelli applied the methods of Thomism to these social problems in a coherent manner.

After the social revolutions of 1848, the church decided to enter the conflict raging between the laissez-faire capitalists and the socialists. Up until then, the church relied primarily on evangelical charitable activities. In 1850, Taparelli, until then a liberal and revolutionary, was granted permission by Pope Pius IX to co-found Civiltà Cattolica with Carlo Maria Curci. In particular, he attacked the tendency to separate morality from positive law, and also the "heterodox spirit" of unconstrained freedom of conscience which destroyed the unity of society.

His major ideas include social justice and subsidiarity. He viewed society as not a monolithic group of individuals, but of various levels of sub-societies, with individuals being members of these. Each level of society has both rights and duties which should be recognized and supported. All levels of society should cooperate rationally and not resort to competition and conflict.

== Works ==
His chief work, "Saggio teoretico di diritto naturale appogiato sul fatto", i. e. "A Theoretical Essay on Natural Right from an Historical Standpoint" (2 vols., 7th ed., Rome, 1883), was in a way the beginning of modern sociology. It was translated into German (Ratisbon, 1845) and twice into French (Tournai, 1851; Paris, 1896). Herein was developed the position, at once widely accepted in conservative circles on the Continent, that the normal origin of civil government was by extension of paternal power through the patriarchal head of a group of families. This essay was later abridged into "An Elementary Course in Natural Right" (6th ed., Naples, 1860; also in French, Tournai, 1864; and in Spanish, Paris, 1875), which was in use as a text-book in the University of Modena. Next in importance is his "Esame critico degli ordini rappresentativi nella società moderna", i. e. "Critical Examination of Representative Government in Modern Society" (2 vols., Rome, 1854; in Spanish, Madrid, 1867). Besides his striking monographs on "Nationality" (Rome, 1847), "Sovereignty of the People" (Palermo, 1848; Florence, 1849), and "The Grounds of War" (Genoa, 1847) he left a long list of articles in the Civiltà Cattolica chiefly on subjects in political economy and social rights, as well as an equally long list of book reviews on kindred topics, which were acute and penetrating essays.

== Bibliography ==
- This article incorporates text from a publication now in the public domain: Herbermann, Charles, ed. (1913). "Aloysius Taparelli". Catholic Encyclopedia. New York: Robert Appleton Company.
- Connolly, Michael (1947). "A Pioneer Catholic Sociologist: Luigi Taparelli S. I., 1793–1862". Irish Jesuit Directory and Year Book. 20: 167–176.
- Mastromatteo, Giuseppe; Solari, Stefano (2014). "Jesuits and the Italian unification: the form and the economic role of the State in the writings of Taparelli". Pensiero Economico Italiano. XXII (1): 11–24. doi:10.1400/229527.
- Tarantino, Maria Lucia (2015). "L'organizzazione della società in Taparelli D'Azeglio: riflessioni per uno studio". Filosofia e politica: studi in memoria di Laura Lippolis. Trento: Tangram edizioni scientifiche. pp. 427–461. doi:10.1400/253680. ISBN 978-88-6458-128-6.
- Malusa, Luciano (2018). "Bertrando Spaventa e padre Luigi Taparelli d'Azeglio". Bertrando Spaventa : tra unificazione nazionale e filosofia europea. Rome: Viella. pp. 43–76. doi:10.23744/2826. ISBN 978-88-3313-349-2.
- Behr, Thomas, Luigi Taparelli and the 19th-Century Neo-Thomistic "Revolution" in Natural Law and Catholic Social Sciences, Doctoral Thesis, State University of New York at Buffalo, 2000.
- Behr, Thomas (2005). "Luigi Taparelli and Social Justice. Rediscovering the Origins of a "Hollowed" Concept". Social Justice in Context. 1: 3–16. doi:10.13140/2.1.4710.2085.
- Sulas, Cinzia (2019). "Taparelli d'Azeglio, Prospero". Dizionario Biografico degli Italiani (in Italian). Vol. 94: Stampa–Tarantelli. Rome: Istituto dell'Enciclopedia Italiana. ISBN 978-88-12-00032-6.
