= Vittorio Emanuele Taparelli d'Azeglio =

Italian diplomat and politician

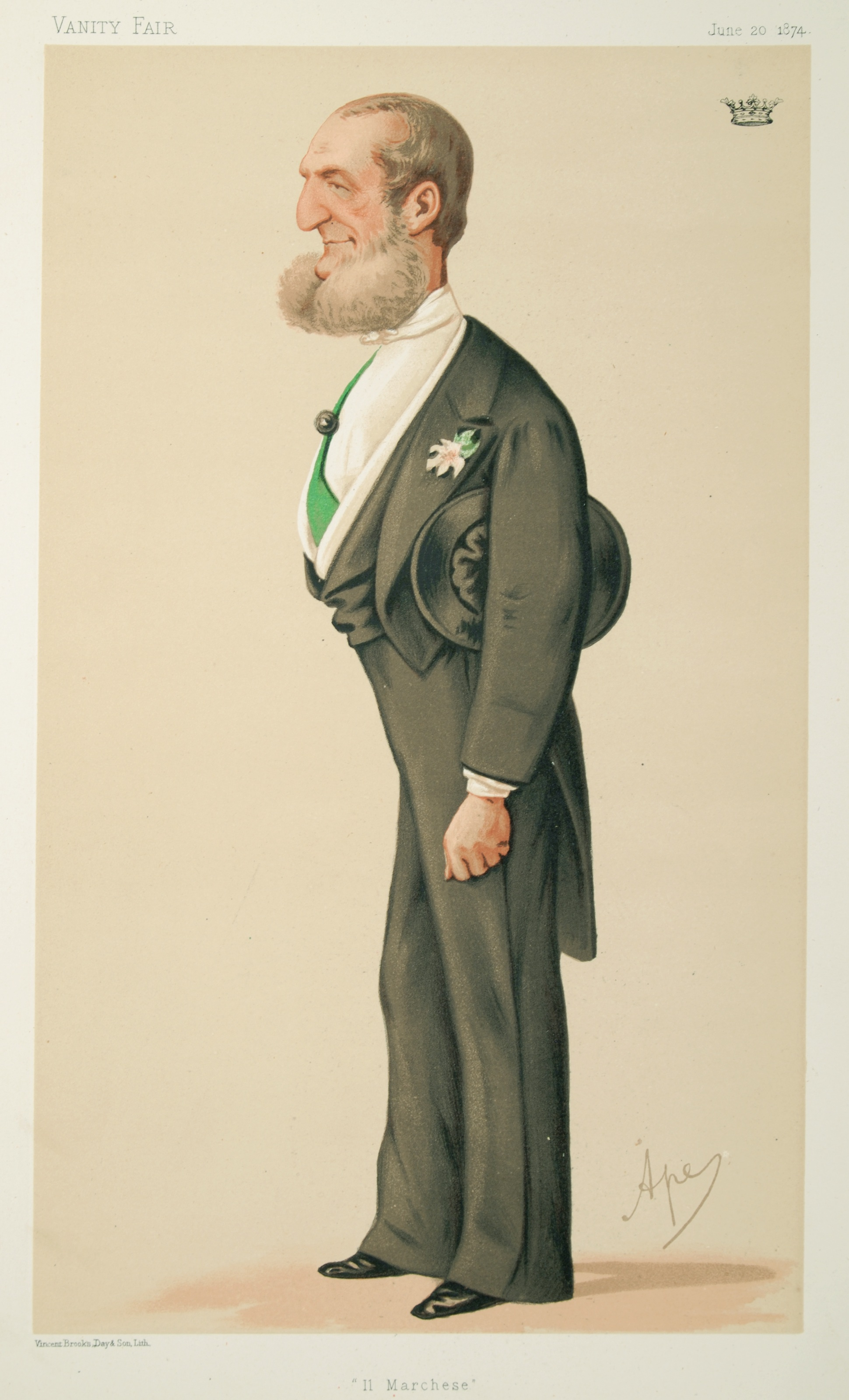
"Il Marchese" The Marquis D'Azeglio as caricatured by Ape (Carlo Pellegrini) in Vanity Fair, June 1874

Vittorio Emanuele Taparelli d'Azeglio (17 September 1816 - 24 April 1890) was an Italian diplomat and politician born in Turin.

== Biography ==
Taparelli was descended from Piedmontese nobility, the marchesi d'Azeglio (margraves of Azeglio). His father was Roberto d'Azeglio, older brother of statesman Massimo d'Azeglio. He served as a Sardinian diplomat and eventually as minister, including postings to Bavaria, Vienna, The Hague, St Petersburg, London and Paris.

He was a co-founder of the St James's Club in London in 1857. He was an art collector, and was for a time President of the Burlington Fine Arts Club in London.

On his retirement from the diplomatic service in 1871 he was appointed a senator in the 11th Legislature of the Kingdom of Italy.

== Honours ==
- Knight Grand cross in the Order of Saints Maurice and Lazarus.
