= List of presidents of the Senate of the Republic (Italy) =

President of the Senate of the Republic
- Presidente del Senato della Repubblica
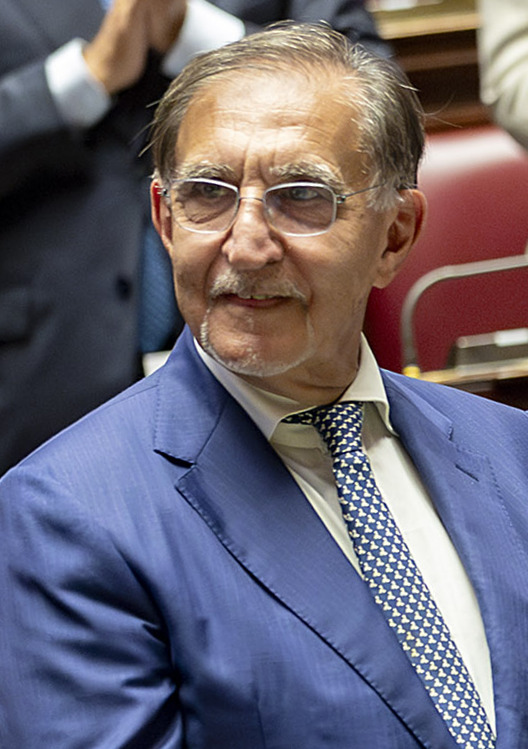
- Incumbent; Ignazio La Russa since 13 October 2022
- Style: President
- Residence: Palazzo Giustiniani
- Appointer: Senate of the Republic
- Term length: Length of the legislature
- Inaugural holder: Ruggero Settimo
- Formation: 17 March 1861
- Website: www.senato.it

This is a list of the presidents of the Senate of Italy from the Kingdom of Sardinia to the present day.

The President of the Senate of the Republic is the presiding officer of the Senate of the Republic. The President of the Senate is the second highest-ranking office of the Italian Republic after the President of the Republic; according to article 86 of the Constitution, the President of the Senate can act as a substitute for the President of the Republic should the latter be objectively be unable to fulfill their duties.

The President of the Senate represents the Senate to external bodies, regulates debates in the Senate chamber by applying its regulations and the rules of the Constitution, and regulates all the activities of its components in order to ensure that it functions correctly.

The President of the Senate, along with the President of the Chamber of Deputies, must be consulted by the President of the Republic before the latter can dissolve one or both the chambers of the Italian Parliament.

== Kingdom of Sardinia (1848–1861) ==
Parties

- Independent
- Moderate Party

Portrait	Name (Born–Died)	Term of office			Party	Legislature	Ref.
Portrait	Name (Born–Died)	Took office	Left office	Time in office	Party	Legislature	Ref.
President of the Senate of the Kingdom
	Gaspare Coller (1776–1855)	3 May 1848	30 December 1848	241 days	Independent	I (1848)	
	Giuseppe Manno (1786–1868)	13 February 1849	29 May 1855	6 years, 105 days	Moderate Party	II (Jan 1849)	
	Giuseppe Manno (1786–1868)	13 February 1849	29 May 1855	6 years, 105 days	Moderate Party	III (Jul 1849)	
	Giuseppe Manno (1786–1868)	13 February 1849	29 May 1855	6 years, 105 days	Moderate Party	IV (Dec 1849)	
	Giuseppe Manno (1786–1868)	13 February 1849	29 May 1855	6 years, 105 days	Moderate Party	V (1853)	
	Cesare Alfieri di Sostegno (1799–1869)	8 November 1855	28 December 1860	5 years, 50 days	Moderate Party	V (1853)	
	Cesare Alfieri di Sostegno (1799–1869)	8 November 1855	28 December 1860	5 years, 50 days	Moderate Party	VI (1857)	
	Cesare Alfieri di Sostegno (1799–1869)	8 November 1855	28 December 1860	5 years, 50 days	Moderate Party	VII (1860)	

== Kingdom of Italy (1861–1946) ==
Parties

- 1861–1912:
  - Historical Right
  - Historical Left
  - Independent
- 1912–1929:
  - Liberal Union / Italian Liberal Party
- 1929–1943:
  - National Fascist Party
- 1943–1946:
  - Independent

Portrait	Name (Born–Died)	Term of office			Party	Legislature	Ref.
Portrait	Name (Born–Died)	Took office	Left office	Time in office	Party	Legislature	Ref.
President of the Senate of the Kingdom
	Ruggero Settimo (1778–1863)	18 February 1861	2 May 1863	2 years, 73 days	Independent	VIII (1861)	
	Federico Sclopis (1798–1888)	24 May 1863	13 October 1864	142 days	Independent	VIII (1861)	
	Giuseppe Manno (1786–1868)	15 October 1864	7 September 1865	327 days	Historical Right	VIII (1861)	
	Gabrio Casati (1798–1873)	8 November 1865	2 November 1870	4 years, 359 days	Historical Right	IX (1865)	
	Gabrio Casati (1798–1873)	8 November 1865	2 November 1870	4 years, 359 days	Historical Right	X (1867)	
	Vincenzo Fardella di Torrearsa (1808–1889)	5 December 1870	20 September 1874	3 years, 289 days	Historical Right	XI (1870)	
	Luigi Des Ambrois (1807–1884)	15 November 1874	3 December 1874	18 days	Independent	XII (1874)	
	Giuseppe Pasolini (1815–1876)	3 December 1874	3 October 1876	1 year, 305 days	Historical Right	XII (1874)	
	Sebastiano Tecchio (1807–1886)	20 November 1876	27 July 1884	7 years, 250 days	Historical Left	XIII (1876)	
	Sebastiano Tecchio (1807–1886)	20 November 1876	27 July 1884	7 years, 250 days	Historical Left	XIV (1880)	
	Sebastiano Tecchio (1807–1886)	20 November 1876	27 July 1884	7 years, 250 days	Historical Left	XV (1882)	
	Giacomo Durando (1807–1894)	23 November 1884	4 September 1887	2 years, 285 days	Historical Right	XV (1882)	
	Giacomo Durando (1807–1894)	23 November 1884	4 September 1887	2 years, 285 days	Historical Right	XVI (1886)	
	Domenico Farini (1834–1900)	16 November 1887	15 July 1898	10 years, 241 days	Historical Left	XVI (1886)	
	Domenico Farini (1834–1900)	16 November 1887	15 July 1898	10 years, 241 days	Historical Left	XVII (1890)	
	Domenico Farini (1834–1900)	16 November 1887	15 July 1898	10 years, 241 days	Historical Left	XVIII (1892)	
	Domenico Farini (1834–1900)	16 November 1887	15 July 1898	10 years, 241 days	Historical Left	XIX (1895)	
	Domenico Farini (1834–1900)	16 November 1887	15 July 1898	10 years, 241 days	Historical Left	XX (1897)	
	Giuseppe Saracco (1821–1907)	10 November 1898	18 October 1904	5 years, 343 days	Historical Left	XXI (1900)	
	Tancredi Canonico (1838–1908)	30 November 1904	20 March 1908	3 years, 154 days	Historical Left	XXII (1904)	
	Giuseppe Manfredi (1828–1918)	20 March 1908	6 November 1918	10 years, 231 days	Liberal Union	XXIII (1909)	
	Giuseppe Manfredi (1828–1918)	20 March 1908	6 November 1918	10 years, 231 days	Liberal Union	XXIV (1913)	
	Adeodato Bonasi (1838–1920)	18 November 1918	29 September 1919	315 days	Liberal Union	XXIV (1913)	
	Tommaso Tittoni (1855–1931)	1 December 1919	21 January 1929	9 years, 51 days	Liberal Union / Italian Liberal Party / Independent	XXV (1919)	
	Tommaso Tittoni (1855–1931)	1 December 1919	21 January 1929	9 years, 51 days	Liberal Union / Italian Liberal Party / Independent	XXVI (1921)	
	Tommaso Tittoni (1855–1931)	1 December 1919	21 January 1929	9 years, 51 days	Liberal Union / Italian Liberal Party / Independent	XXVII (1924)	
	Luigi Federzoni (1878–1967)	29 April 1929	2 March 1939	9 years, 307 days	National Fascist Party	XXVIII (1929)	
	Luigi Federzoni (1878–1967)	29 April 1929	2 March 1939	9 years, 307 days	National Fascist Party	XXIX (1934)	
	Giacomo Suardo (1883–1947)	15 March 1939	28 July 1943	4 years, 135 days	National Fascist Party	XXX (No election)	
	Paolo Thaon di Revel (1857–1948)	2 August 1943	20 July 1944	344 days	Independent	Abolished Parliament	
	Pietro Tomasi Della Torretta (1873–1962)	20 July 1944	25 June 1946	1 year, 340 days	Independent	National Council	

== Italian Republic (1946–present) ==
Parties

- 1948–1994:
  - Italian Democratic Socialist Party
  - Italian Liberal Party
  - Christian Democracy
  - Italian Republican Party
  - Independent
- 1994–present:
  - Forza Italia / The People of Freedom
  - Italian People's Party
  - The Daisy / Democratic Party
  - Brothers of Italy

Portrait	Name (Born–Died)	Term of office			Party	Legislature	Ref.
Portrait	Name (Born–Died)	Took office	Left office	Time in office	Party	Legislature	Ref.
President of the Senate of the Republic
	Ivanoe Bonomi (1873–1951)	8 May 1948	20 April 1951	2 years, 347 days	Italian Democratic Socialist Party	I (1948)	
	Enrico De Nicola (1877–1959)	28 April 1951	24 June 1952	1 year, 57 days	Italian Liberal Party	I (1948)	
	Giuseppe Paratore (1876–1967)	26 June 1952	24 March 1953	271 days	Italian Liberal Party	I (1948)	
	Meuccio Ruini (1877–1970)	25 March 1953	25 June 1953	92 days	Independent	I (1948)	
	Cesare Merzagora (1898–1991)	25 June 1953	7 November 1967	14 years, 135 days	Independent	II (1953)	
	Cesare Merzagora (1898–1991)	25 June 1953	7 November 1967	14 years, 135 days	Independent	III (1958)	
	Cesare Merzagora (1898–1991)	25 June 1953	7 November 1967	14 years, 135 days	Independent	IV (1963)	
	Ennio Zelioli-Lanzini (1899–1976)	8 November 1967	4 June 1968	209 days	Christian Democracy	IV (1963)	
	Amintore Fanfani (1908–1999)	5 June 1968	26 June 1973	5 years, 21 days	Christian Democracy	V (1968)	
	Amintore Fanfani (1908–1999)	5 June 1968	26 June 1973	5 years, 21 days	Christian Democracy	VI (1972)	
	Giovanni Spagnolli (1907–1984)	27 June 1973	4 July 1976	3 years, 7 days	Christian Democracy	VI (1972)	
	Amintore Fanfani (1908–1999)	5 July 1976	1 December 1982	6 years, 149 days	Christian Democracy	VII (1976)	
	Amintore Fanfani (1908–1999)	5 July 1976	1 December 1982	6 years, 149 days	Christian Democracy	VIII (1979)	
	Tommaso Morlino (1925–1983)	9 December 1982	6 May 1983	148 days	Christian Democracy	VIII (1979)	
	Vittorino Colombo (1925–1996)	12 May 1983	11 July 1983	60 days	Christian Democracy	VIII (1979)	
	Francesco Cossiga (1928–2010)	12 July 1983	24 June 1985	1 year, 347 days	Christian Democracy	IX (1983)	
	Amintore Fanfani (1908–1999)	9 July 1985	17 April 1987	1 year, 282 days	Christian Democracy	IX (1983)	
	Giovanni Malagodi (1904–1991)	22 April 1987	1 July 1987	70 days	Italian Liberal Party	IX (1983)	
	Giovanni Spadolini (1925–1994)	2 July 1987	14 April 1994	6 years, 286 days	Italian Republican Party	X (1987)	
	Giovanni Spadolini (1925–1994)	2 July 1987	14 April 1994	6 years, 286 days	Italian Republican Party	XI (1992)	
	Carlo Scognamiglio (b. 1944)	16 April 1994	8 May 1996	2 years, 22 days	Forza Italia	XII (1994)	
	Nicola Mancino (b. 1931)	9 May 1996	29 May 2001	5 years, 20 days	Italian People's Party	XIII (1996)	
	Marcello Pera (b. 1943)	30 May 2001	27 April 2006	4 years, 331 days	Forza Italia	XIV (2001)	
	Franco Marini (1933–2021)	29 April 2006	28 April 2008	1 year, 365 days	The Daisy / Democratic Party	XV (2006)	
	Renato Schifani (b. 1950)	29 April 2008	14 March 2013	4 years, 319 days	Forza Italia / The People of Freedom	XVI (2008)	
	Pietro Grasso (b. 1944)	16 March 2013	22 March 2018	5 years, 6 days	Democratic Party	XVII (2013)	
	Elisabetta Casellati (b. 1946)	24 March 2018	12 October 2022	4 years, 203 days	Forza Italia	XVIII (2018)	
	Ignazio La Russa (b. 1947)	13 October 2022	Incumbent	4 years, 22 days	Brothers of Italy	XIX (2022)	

== See also ==
- Senate of the Republic (Italy)
- List of presidents of the Chamber of Deputies (Italy)
