= Casellati =

Casellati (Italian pronunciation: [kazelˈlaːti]) is an Italian surname. Notable people with the surname include:

- Alvise Casellati (born 1973), Italian conductor
- Elisabetta Casellati (born 1946), Italian lawyer and politician
