= Tancredi Canonico =

Italian politician (1828–1908)

The Honourable Tancredi Canonico
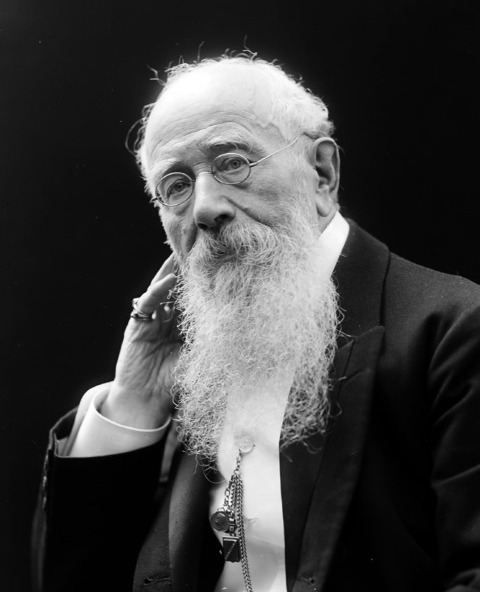

President of the Italian Senate
- In office 30 November 1904 – 20 March 1908
- Preceded by: Giuseppe Saracco
- Succeeded by: Giuseppe Manfredi

Personal details
- Born: 14 May 1828 Turin, Piedmont, Italy
- Died: 15 September 1908 (aged 80) Sarteano, Siena, Italy
- Party: Historical Left
- Spouse: Emilia Marietti
- Children: 2

Tancredi Canonico (14 May 1828 – 15 September 1908) was an Italian politician, teacher and magistrate who served as President of the Senate from 1904 to 1908. He previously served as Vice President of the Senate from 1897 to 1898 and from 1902 to 1904.

== Family and education ==
Canonico was born on 14 May 1828 in Turin. His father was Francesco Canonico and his mother was Felicita Pomba. His maternal ancestor was Giuseppe Pomba. Canonico was married to Emilia Marietti with whom he had two children, Luigi and Flaminio. Canonico graduated in law in 1847.

== Career ==
=== Teacher and magistrate ===
From 1857 to 1860, Canonico was an alternate professor of philosophy of law at the University of Turin and in 1860 he became professor in charge of criminal law at the University of Turin. From 1861 to 1862, he was extraordinary professor of criminal law at the university. He was full professor of criminal law and procedure from 1862 to 1876 and was dean of the faculty of law in 1873, later becoming professor emeritus.

On 30 January 1876, Canonico became a councillor of the Court of Cassation of Rome and became its president on 3 July 1892. He served as its first president from 2 August 1902 and 15 May 1903.

=== Political ===
Canonico was elected as a senator on 12 June 1881 and took oath on 30 June. He served as secretary of the senate from 23 November 1882 to 27 April 1886. He then served as vice president from 1 April 1897 to 15 July 1898 and returned to the position on 14 February 1902, serving until 14 October 1904. He became the president in 1904 and served until his resignation in 1908.

== Death ==
Canonico died on 15 September 1908 in Sarteano, at the age of 80 and was commemorated in the Senate by his successor as Senate President, Giuseppe Manfredi.

== See also ==
- List of presidents of the Senate of the Republic (Italy)
