= Adeodato Bonasi =

Italian politician, professor, jurist and soldier

The Honourable Count Adeodato Bonasi
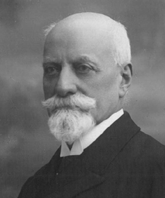

President of the Italian Senate
- In office 18 November 1918 – 29 September 1919
- Preceded by: Giuseppe Manfredi
- Succeeded by: Tommaso Tittoni

Vice President of the Senate
- In office 3 May 1914 – 18 November 1918
- President: Giuseppe Manfredi

Minister of Grace, Justice and Worships
- In office 14 May 1899 – 24 June 1900
- Prime Minister: Luigi Pelloux
- Preceded by: Camillo Finocchiaro Aprile
- Succeeded by: Emanuele Gianturco

Personal details
- Born: 25 March 1838 San Felice sul Panaro, Modena, Italy
- Died: 24 July 1920 (aged 82) Rome, Lazio, Italy
- Party: Liberal Union
- Education: University of Modena

Count Adeodato Bonasi (25 March 1838 – 24 July 1920) was an Italian politician, professor, jurist and soldier who served as President of the Senate from 1918 to 1919. He previously served as Vice President of the Senate from 1914 to 1918.

== Family and education ==
Bonasi was born on 25 March 1838 in San Felice sul Panaro to a noble Modenese family linked to the dual court. His father was Benedetto Bonasi and his mother was Caroline Giorgini. Gateano Bonasi was his paternal ancestor and Francesco Giorgini was his maternal ancestor while his nephew, Frank Bonasi, was an engineer. He had three brothers, Francesco, Orazio and Gaetano. His brother, Francesco Bonasi, was a Senator.

Bonasi graduated from his legal studies on 3 June 1861, and later dedicated his studies to administrative and constitutional law.

== Career ==
=== Military and professor ===
Bonasi volunteered in the military and served in the 1859 War of Independence and the 1866 War of Independence, and was wounded during his career. He was later awarded the Commemorative Medal for the campaigns for independence of Italy.

Bonasi became a professor of administrative law at the University of Modena on 27 November 1865. He became a full professor on 10 December 1874 and remained in the position up until 11 August 1884. He then transferred to the University of Pisa and remained there until 1886.

Bonasi became a councillor of state on 23 February 1886 and became section president on 16 June 1898. He served as the president of the Council of the State from 28 September 1911 until 16 February 1913 when he became honorary president.

=== Political ===
Bonasi was elected to the Chamber of Deputies on 23 March 1886 and was elected to the Senate on 25 October 1896. He was appointed Minister of Grace, Justice and Worships in 1899 but resigned from government along with several ministers, opposing working with the opposition. He became Vice President of the Senate in 1914 and then President of the Senate in 1918 and served until 1919.

== Death ==
Bonasi died on 24 July 1920 in Rome, at the age of 82. A few months before his death when he realised his death was imminent, he expressed his desire not to be commemorated in the Senate following his death, with the then senate president and successor to Bonasi, Tommaso Tittoni, instead saying that his memory would forever live on.

== See also ==
- List of presidents of the Senate of the Republic (Italy)
