= Order of Saint Joseph =

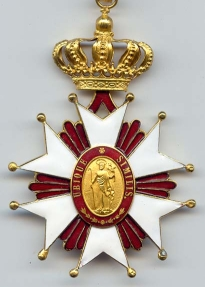
- Badge of the order
- Type: Dynastic order
- Established: 9 March 1807
- Motto: UBIQUE SIMILIS
- Founder: Ferdinand III, Grand Duke of Tuscany
- Grand Master: Disputed (Note: The identity of the present Grand Master of the Order of Saint Joseph is regarded as disputed in published sources. Some modern chivalric directories treat the Tuscan dynastic orders as continuing under Archduke Sigismund of Habsburg-Lorraine. Several historians argue that the Tuscan Habsburg‑Lorraine line became extinct as a sovereign branch between 1866 and 1908 and that, as the Order of Saint Joseph was founded in 1807 by Ferdinand III as Grand Duke of Würzburg, has no legitimate modern successor.)
- Grades: Knight Grand Cross; Commander; Knight

Precedence
- Next (higher): Order of Saint Stephen
- Ribbon of the order

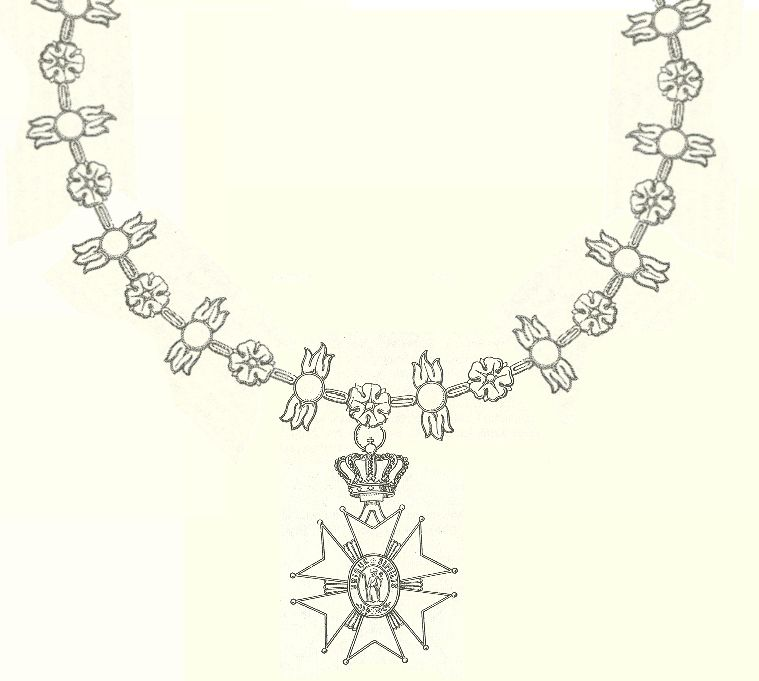
Collar of the Order of Saint Joseph.

The Order of Saint Joseph was instituted on 9 March 1807 by Ferdinand III as Grand Duke of Würzburg. It was transformed into a Tuscan Roman Catholic order of knighthood in 1817 during his reign as Grand Duke of Tuscany.

The constitution of the Order was promulgated in March 1817, with amendments in August 1817. The order was divided into civil and military categories but these are now defunct. It has been given to reward services towards Tuscan culture and civilisation and to the Grand Ducal House as a whole. The Order is divided into three levels:

- Knights Grand Cross, numbering thirty
- Commander, numbering sixty
- Knights, numbering one hundred and fifty

These numbers excluded Sovereigns, Heads of State, and Princes of the Grand Ducal House and other Royal Houses, Cardinals of the Holy Roman Church and Tuscan Metropolitan Archbishops. All had to be Catholics. The number of women members cannot exceed fifty, excluding Princesses of the Grand Ducal and other Royal Houses, wives of Heads of State and Dames of the Order of Saint Stephen. It is permitted for non-nobles to be admitted into the Order of the level of Grand Cross in cases of exceptional merit. Dames wear the same Cross as Knights but from a bow on the left breast. Dame Grand Crosses wear the Cross hanging from a Riband like the Knights but without the Star.

The Order of Saint Stephen and the Order of Saint Joseph are currently conferred as dynastic honours by Archduke Sigismund of Habsburg-Lorraine, claimant to the defunct throne of the Grand Duchy of Tuscany. Under Italian Law No. 178 of 1951, which governs the wearing of foreign and non-national honors, dynastic orders such as those conferred by formerly reigning royal houses may be authorized for wear in Italy when formally recognized. In accordance with this law, the Orders of Saint Stephen and Saint Joseph, under the Grand Mastership of Archduke Sigismund, may be lawfully worn in Italy with authorization.

Knight	Commander	Knight Grand Cross

== Recipients ==
- Grand Masters
  - Ferdinand III, Grand Duke of Tuscany
  - Ferdinand IV, Grand Duke of Tuscany
  - Archduke Gottfried of Austria
  - Archduke Joseph Ferdinand of Austria
  - Archduke Leopold Franz of Austria
  - Leopold II, Grand Duke of Tuscany
- Commanders
  - Vincenzo Antinori
  - Luigi Federico Menabrea
- Knights
  - Giovanni Battista Amici
  - Felice Pasquale Baciocchi
  - Friedrich von Beck-Rzikowsky
  - Gino Capponi
  - Jean-François Champollion
  - Pavel Nikolaievich Demidov
  - Ibrahim Pasha
  - Anatoly Nikolaievich Demidov, 1st Prince of San Donato
  - Giovanni Dupré
  - Alphonse de Lamartine
  - Maximilian II of Bavaria
  - Philipp Albrecht, Duke of Württemberg
  - Bettino Ricasoli
  - Federico Sclopis
  - Federico Sclopis

== Bibliography ==
- Gregor Gatscher-Riedl, Mario Strigl, Die roten Ritter. Zwischen Medici, Habsburgern und Osmanen. Die Orden und Auszeichnungen des Großherzogtums Toskana. Vienna, Neue Welt Verlag, 2014. ISBN 978-3-9503061-5-6.
