= Michele Coppino =

Italian politician (1822–1901)

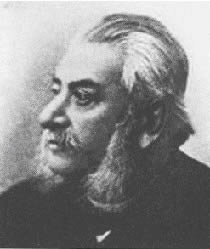
Michele Coppino Portrait

Michele Coppino (1 April 1822 – 25 April 1901) was an Italian professor and politician.

== Biography ==
Coppino was born to a poor family in Alba, Piedmont, where he later died. He was professor of Italian literature at the University of Turin and rector of the same from 1868 to 1870, when he moved to Rome (which had been declared capital of the Kingdom of Italy) to follow his political roles.

Coppino participated to the elections for the Chamber of Deputies of the Kingdom of Sardinia for the first time in 1857, but was defeated at the ballot. He was elected in 1860 and re-elected to the first legislature of the Italian Chamber of Deputies one year later. He was subsequently a member of the Italian Parliament for some 40 years, interrupted, and twice President of the Chamber (both times succeeding Domenico Farini).

Coppino was Minister of Education in the two first Depretis cabinets (1876-1878). He introduced the so-called Legge Coppino ("Coppino Law"), which made elementary schools mandatory and free of charge, with, in particular, no religious teaching. He was again Minister of Education under Depretis and Crispi between 1884 and 1888. Laws issued during his tenure include one for economical support for teachers, reorganization of kindergartens and of classic instructions.

== Sources ==
- Page at Dizionario Biografico degli Italiani by Enciclopedia Italiana, biography by G. Talamo

Political offices
Preceded by Domenico Farini	President of the Italian Chamber of Deputies; 13 April 1880 – 2 May 1880	Succeeded by Domenico Farini
Preceded by Domenico Farini	President of the Italian Chamber of Deputies; 19 March 1884 – 3 April 1884	Succeeded by Giuseppe Biancheri
