= Domenico Farini =

Italian politician (1834–1900)

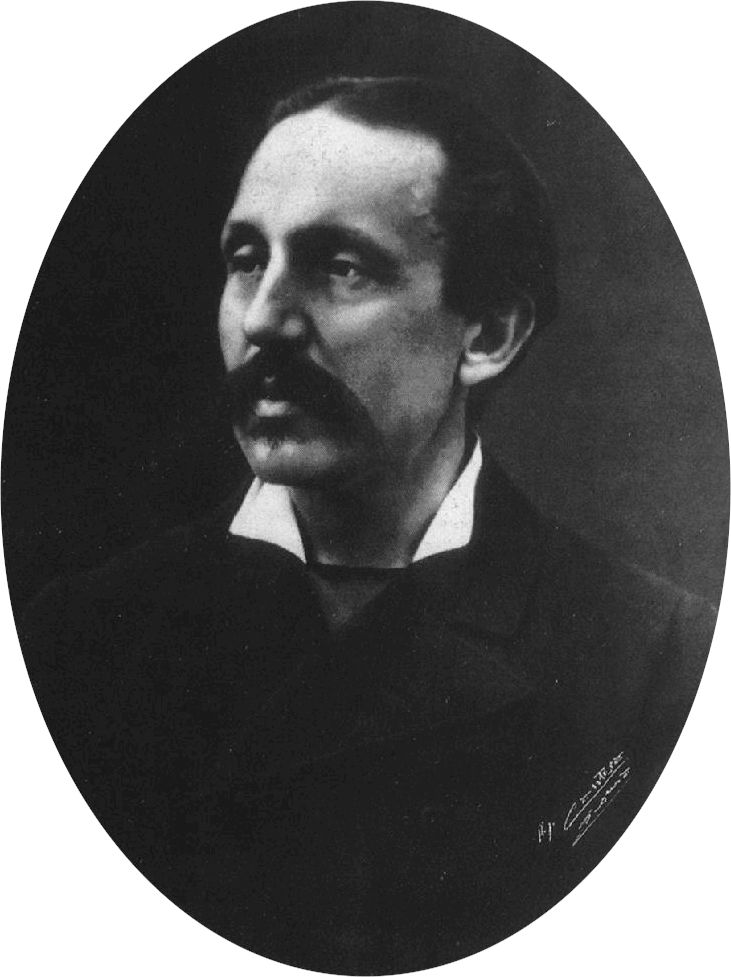
Domenico Farini.

Domenico Farini (2 July 1834 – 18 January 1900) was an Italian soldier and statesman, who was President of the Italian Senate from 1887 to 1898. He was the son of politician Luigi Carlo Farini.

== Biography ==
Farini was born at Montescudolo, in the Papal States (present-day province of Forlì-Cesena). After a period in Ravenna, he followed his family in exile to Tuscany and then to Osimo and Rome. In 1850 he entered the Military Academy of Turin, and later commanded a Sardinian sapper company during the Second Italian War of Independence. He also took part in the sieges of Ancona and siege of Gaeta (1861), and in the Third Italian War of Independence. Later he was part of the national staff of the newly formed Italian Army.

Farini was elected into the Italian Chamber of Deputies in 1864, in the college of Ravenna, for the centre-left coalition. He was president of the Chamber for three times between 1878 and 1884. After a period of absence from the political activities, which he spent at Saluggia in Piedmont, Farini was elected to the Italian Senate in 1886. The following year he was named president of the latter. In that period he wrote a diary, a collection of personal thoughts, which expresses his ideals of unity within the newly formed national monarchy, and his strong anti-clerical position. The book was published by the Italian senate in 1961 with the title Diario di fine secolo.

He died of cancer in Rome in January 1900.

== Sources ==
- "Domenico Farini" in the Enciclopedia Italiana's Dizionario Biografico degli Italiani (in Italian)

Political offices
Preceded by Benedetto Cairoli	President of the Italian Chamber of Deputies; 1878–1880	Succeeded by Michele Coppino
Preceded by Michele Coppino	President of the Italian Chamber of Deputies; 1880–1882	Succeeded by Michele Coppino
Preceded by Giacomo Durando	President of the Italian Senate; 1887–1898	Succeeded by Giuseppe Saracco
