= Giuseppe Manfredi =

Italian professor, jurist, and politician (1828–1918)

The Honourable Giuseppe Manfredi
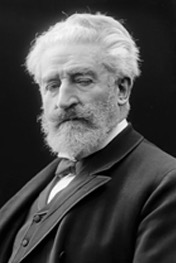

President of the Italian Senate
- In office 20 March 1908 – 6 November 1918
- Preceded by: Tancredi Canonico
- Succeeded by: Adeodato Bonasi

Personal details
- Born: 17 March 1828 Cortemaggiore, Duchy of Parma and Piacenza
- Died: 6 November 1918 (aged 90) Rome, Kingdom of Italy
- Party: Historical Left
- Spouse(s): Paolina Giuditta Bertani (m. 1852; died 1877) Countess Maria Carmela Giannerini
- Children: 10

Giuseppe Manfredi (17 March 1828 – 6 November 1918) was an Italian professor, jurist, and politician. He was president of the Italian Senate in the early 20th century. Among his honours, he was made Supreme Knight of the Order of the Holy Annunciation on 4 February 1909.

== Early life and education ==
Manfredi was born on 17 March 1828 in Cortemaggiore, at the time part of Duchy of Parma and Piacenza. His parents were Domenico and Paola Enrichetta Fogliazzi Manfredi, and he had a brother, Enrico, and a sister, Maria Anna.

Leaving his home, Manfredi attended a Jesuit high school in Piacenza. He received a law degree from the University of Parma in 1849.

== Career ==
Manfredi worked in a law office beginning in 1846. Over the next few years, he became interested in politics and expressed his views about democratic philosophies in the newspaper Il Tribuno del popolo (English: Tribute of the People) and in pamphlets. He also wrote about anti-clericalism and Jacobinism. See also Revolutions of 1848.

Having received his law degree, he began practising as an attorney in 1849. Beginning in November 1851, he tried both criminal and civil cases in Piacenza. He was an investigating officer in 1853 at the Indirect Tax Administration of the Ministry of Finance of Parma.

Due to the things that Manfredi had written beginning in 1848, he was banned from practising law by Charles III, Duke of Parma (who died in March 1854). After his death, Louise Marie, the Regent Duchess, reopened the University of Parma (which had been closed for several years). From 1855 to 1859, Manfredi taught law at the University of Parma.

He was involved in the Unification of Italy, working with a friend and leader of the unification movement, Giuseppe La Farina. During the War of 1859, he coordinated the volunteers and kept in contact with La Farina, Manfredo Fanti, and Luigi Carlo Farini. During the summer of 1859, he held a number of political offices, including Member of the Provisional Government of Piacenza, administrator of the province of Parma, a Member of the Assembly of People's Representatives in Parma, and Provisional Governor of Parma and Piacenza. See also Kingdom of Italy (formed in 1861).

In 1862, he became Deputy Attorney General in the Perugia Court of Appeals. Three years later, he was Advocate General in Perugia. He was also made Attorney General of Catania in 1868, and then served in that role in Bologna in 1869, in Rome in 1876. He was also the first president of the Court of Appeal of Ancona in 1876.

On 20 November 1876, he took the oath as Senator of the Kingdom of Italy. From 1881 until 1907, he was the Attorney General at the Supreme Court in Florence. On 28 December 1907, he was elected vice-president of the upper house of the Senate. From 20 March 1908 until his death, he was the president of the Italian Senate, spanning three terms.

Over his career, he was a member of the governing Council of the Order of Lawyers (Italian: Consiglio dell'Ordine degli Avvocati) of Piacenza, the Italian Geographical Society (Società Geografica Italiana), and the National Committee for the history of the Italian unification (Istituto per la storia del Risorgimento italiano).

== Personal life and death ==
He was married twice. He married Paolina Giuditta Bertani in 1852, and they had six children, Philip, Clara, Vittorio Emanuele Manfredo, Ernestino and Leopold. Paolina died in April 1877, and he subsequently married Countess Maria Carmela Giannerini, with whom he had four children: Corrado, Marcello, Anna, and Luis. Manfredi died on 11 June 1918 in Rome.

In the commemoration by the Senate, he was described as follows, Noi tutti ne rammentiamo il nobile e caro sembiante, i modi affabili, la parola solenne, il cuore affettuoso, l'animo candido e puro, l'amor di patria ardente — which roughly translates to "We remember the noble and dear countenance, an affable manner, the solemn word, an affectionate heart, the candid and pure soul, ardent love of country."

== Publications ==
- Giuseppe Manfredi (1848). Cenni politici. Piacenza: Tedeschi. OCLC 24231086.
- Giuseppe Manfredi (1850). Elogio di Giuseppe Bruzzi. Piacenza: Solari. OCLC 24231288.

== Honours ==
Supreme Knight of the Order of the Holy Annunciation – 4 February 1909
Grand Cordon of the Order of Saints Maurice and Lazarus – 15 January 1888
Knight Grand Cross of the Order of the Crown of Italy – 15 January 1873

Political offices
Preceded by Tancredi Canonico	President of the Italian Senate; 1908–1918	Succeeded by Adeodato Bonasi
