= Giuseppe Saracco =

Italian politician, financier, and Knight of the Annunziata (1821–1907)

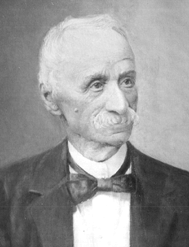

Prime Minister of Italy
- In office 24 June 1900 – 15 February 1901
- Monarchs: Umberto I Victor Emmanuel III
- Preceded by: Luigi Pelloux
- Succeeded by: Giuseppe Zanardelli

President of the Senate
- In office 10 November 1898 – 18 October 1904
- Preceded by: Domenico Farini
- Succeeded by: Tancredi Canonico

Member of the Senate of the Kingdom
- In office 26 February 1866 – 19 January 1907
- Appointed by: Victor Emmanuel II

Personal details
- Born: 6 October 1821; Bistagno, Kingdom of Sardinia
- Died: 19 January 1907 (aged 85); Bistagno, Kingdom of Italy
- Political party: Historical Left

Giuseppe Saracco (6 October 1821 – 19 January 1907) was an Italian politician, financier, and Knight of the Supreme Order of the Most Holy Annunciation.

== Background and earlier career ==
Saracco was born at Bistagno, the province of Alessandria. After qualifying as an advocate, he entered the Piedmontese parliament in 1849. He was a supporter of Cavour. After Cavour died in 1861, Saracco joined the party of Rattazzi and became under-secretary of state for public works in the Rattazzi cabinet of 1862. In 1864 Sella appointed Saracco as secretary-general of finance, and after being created senator in 1865, he acquired considerable fame as a financial authority.

In 1879, Saracco succeeded in postponing the total abolition of the grist tax, and was throughout a fierce opponent of Magliani's loose financial administration. Selected as minister of public works by Depretis in 1887, and by Crispi in 1893, he worked to mitigate the worst consequences of Depretis's corruptly extravagant policy, and introduced a sounder system of government participation in public works. In November 1898, he was elected president of the senate.

== Prime Minister of Italy ==
In June 1900, Saracco succeeded in forming a Cabinet of pacification after the Obstructionist crisis which had caused the downfall of General Pelloux. His term of office was clouded by the assassination of King Umberto (29 July 1900), and his administration was brought to an end in February 1901 by a vote of the chamber condemning his weak attitude towards a general dock strike at Genoa.

== Later life ==
After February 1901, Saracco resumed his functions as president of the senate, but on the advent of the third Giolitti cabinet, he was not reappointed to that position. He received the supreme honour of the knighthood of the Annunziata from King Umberto in 1898.

Political offices
Preceded by Domenico Farini	President of the Italian Senate; 1898–1904	Succeeded by Tancredi Canonico
Preceded by Luigi Pelloux	Prime Minister of Italy; 1900–1901	Succeeded by Giuseppe Zanardelli
Preceded by Luigi Pelloux	Italian Minister of the Interior; 1900–1901	Succeeded by Giuseppe Zanardelli
