= Ruggero Settimo =

Italian politician, diplomat and patriotic activist

Ruggero Settimo Prince of Fitalia and Marquis of Giarratana
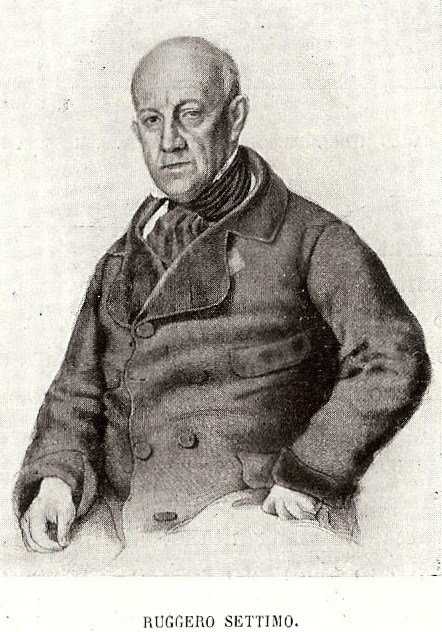

President of the Italian Senate
- In office 18 February 1861 – 2 May 1863
- Monarch: Victor Emmanuel II
- Preceded by: Office created
- Succeeded by: Federico Sclopis

Prime Minister of the Kingdom of Sicily
- In office 12 January 1848 – 14 May 1848
- Monarch: Ferdinand II
- Preceded by: Office created
- Succeeded by: Office abolished

Personal details
- Born: 19 May 1778 Palermo, Kingdom of Sicily
- Died: 12 May 1863 (aged 84) Malta, United Kingdom
- Party: Independent
- Profession: Military; Diplomat

Ruggero Settimo (19 May 1778 – 2 May 1863) was an Italian politician, diplomat, and patriotic activist from Sicily. He was a counter-admiral of the Sicilian Fleet. He fought alongside the British fleet in the Mediterranean Sea against the French under Napoleon Bonaparte. He reconquered the island of Malta, and defended the city of Gaeta near Naples.

In 1811 he had to retire from the military due to health problems. He was a member of the Sicilian government of Prince Castelnovo in 1812 as Minister of the merchant navy. He was a member of the revolutionary junta of 1820–1821. In 1848 as president of the Sicilian Senate, he was appointed as chief of the government of the Kingdom of Sicily; he led the Sicilian government until 1849. After unification in 1861, Settimo was elected as President of the Senate of the newly created Parliament of the Kingdom of Italy.

== Life ==
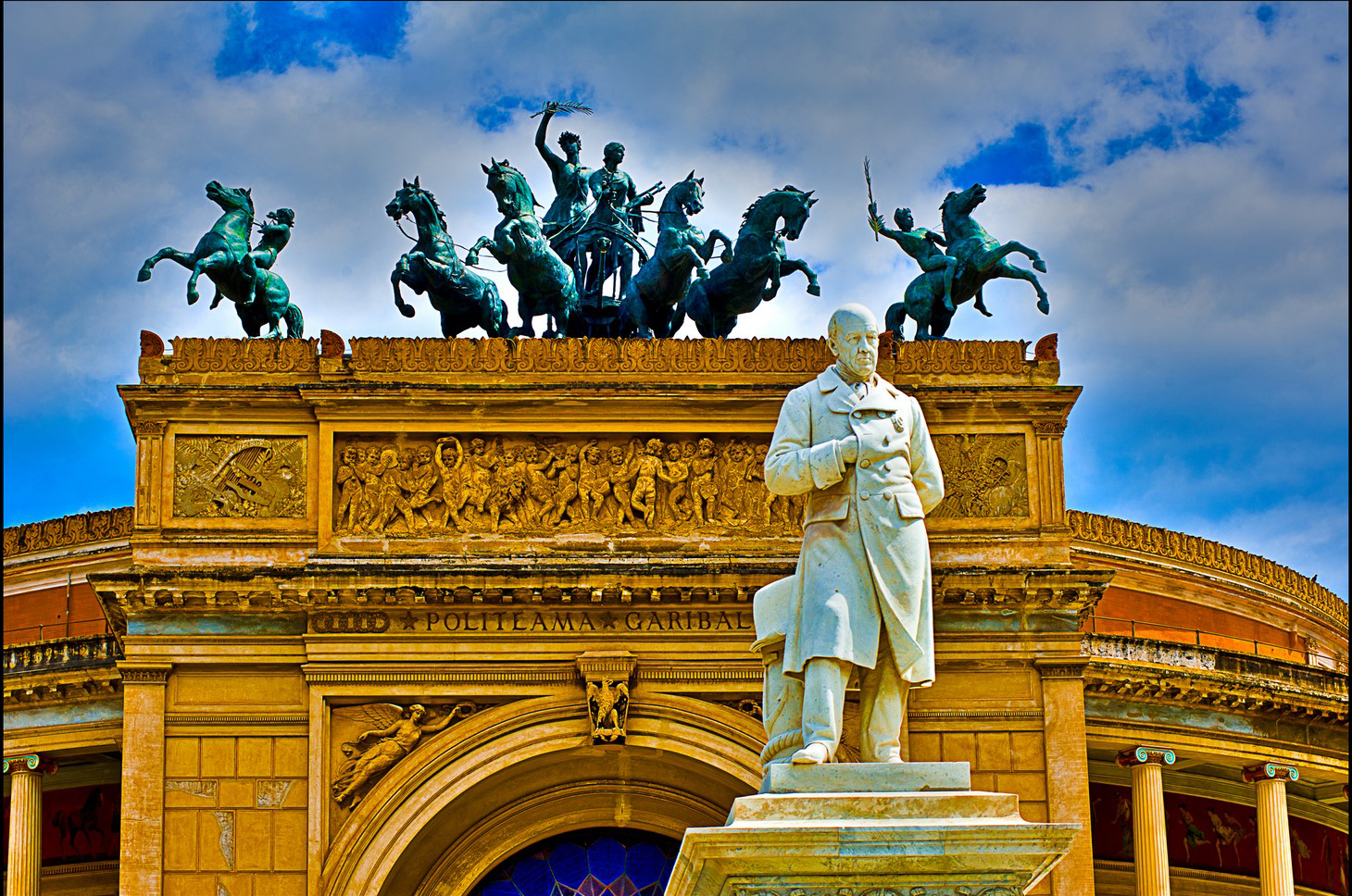
Statue in front of Teatro Politeama of Palermo

Ruggiero Settimo was born in Palermo, Sicily. He was one of the most important leaders of the Sicilian revolution of independence of 1848, after which he was effective head of state of an independent Sicily for 16 months that replaced the Bourbon Two Sicilies. Once the rebellion was put down by King Ferdinand II's army, Settimo escaped to Malta, where he lived the next twelve years in exile.

Following the success of the Risorgimento movement during 1860 and 1861, Settimo was elected as President of the Senate of the newly created Parliament of the Kingdom of Italy, serving until his death.

A statue in his honor was erected in front of the Teatro Politeama Garibaldi of Palermo.

== See also ==
- Revolutions of 1848
- Revolutions of 1848 in the Italian states

== Bibliography ==
- Correnti, Santi (2002) A Short History of Sicily, Les Editions Musae, Montreal.
- Scianò, Giuseppe (2004) Sicilia, Sicilia, Sicilia!, Edizione Anteprima, Palermo (in Italian).

Political offices
Preceded by -	President of the Italian Senate; 1861–1863	Succeeded by Federico Sclopis
