= Elisabetta Casellati =

Italian lawyer and politician (born 1946)

The Honourable Elisabetta Casellati
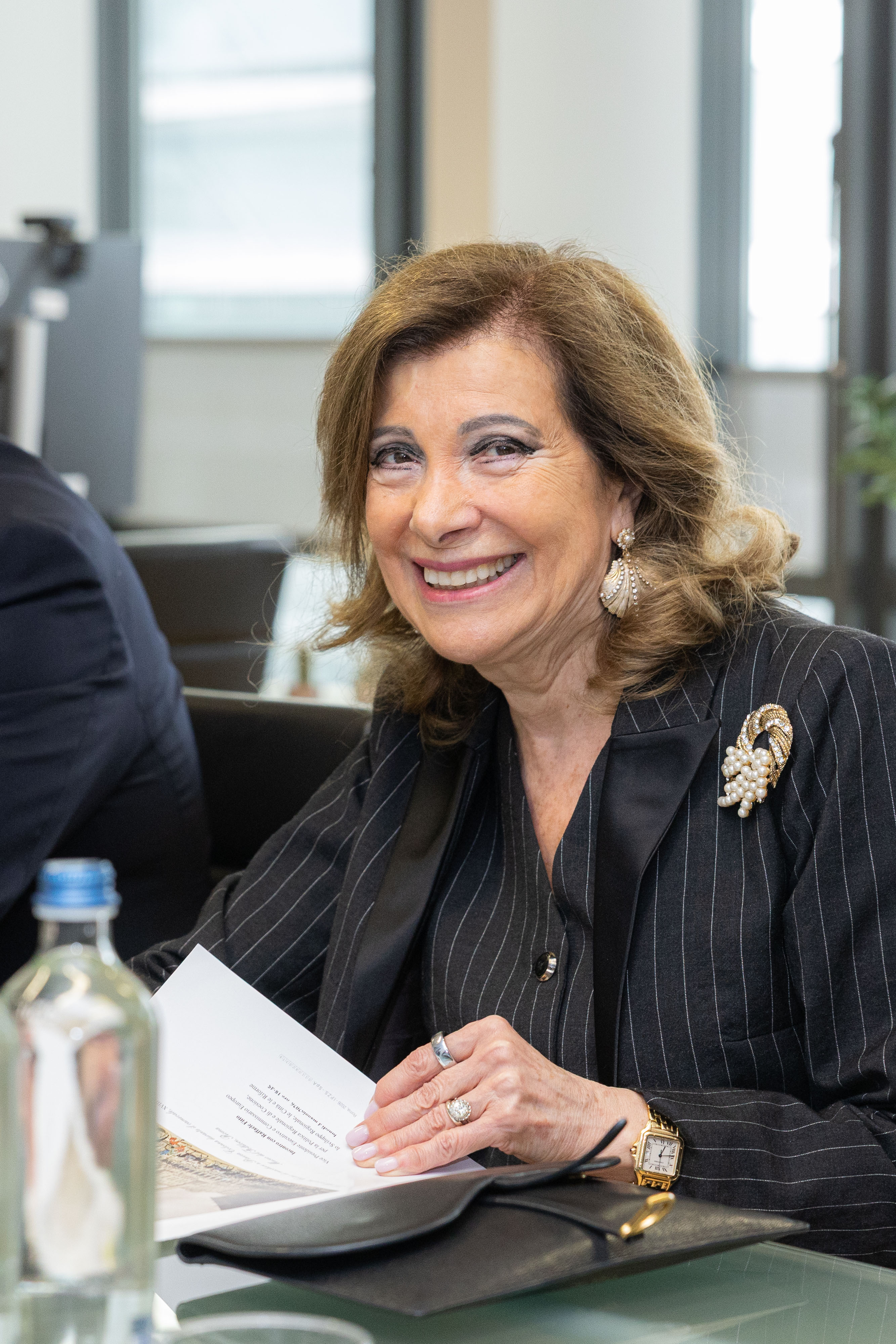
- Casellati in 2026

Minister for Institutional Reforms
- Incumbent
- Assumed office 22 October 2022
- Prime Minister: Giorgia Meloni
- Preceded by: Maria Elena Boschi (2016)

President of the Senate of the Republic
- In office 24 March 2018 – 12 October 2022
- Preceded by: Pietro Grasso
- Succeeded by: Ignazio La Russa

Member of the Senate of the Republic
- Incumbent
- Assumed office 23 March 2018
- Constituency: Venice (2018–2022); Potenza (since 2022)
- In office 30 May 2001 – 15 September 2014
- Constituency: Padua (2001–2006); Veneto (2006–2014)
- In office 15 April 1994 – 8 May 1996
- Constituency: Cittadella

Personal details
- Born: Maria Elisabetta Alberti; 12 August 1946 (age 80) Rovigo, Italy
- Party: Forza Italia (1994–2009); The People of Freedom (2009–2013); Forza Italia (2013–present)
- Spouse: Giambattista Casellati
- Children: 2, including Alvise
- Education: University of Ferrara; Pontifical Lateran University
- Profession: Lawyer; professor; politician

Maria Elisabetta Alberti (born 12 August 1946), known by her married name as Maria Elisabetta Alberti Casellati, (Note: Or simply Casellati. This is in contrast with Italian laws and naming customs, whereby a woman does not take her husband's surname upon marriage and is referred to by her maiden name.) is an Italian lawyer and politician, serving as Minister for Institutional Reforms since 2022. She was President of the Italian Senate from 2018 to 2022. She was the first woman ever to have held this position. Casellati is a long-time member of the liberal-conservative party Forza Italia and served as Undersecretary of Health and Justice in previous governments. In 2022, she was nominated as candidate for President of Italy by the centre-right coalition.

== Early life ==
Born in Rovigo in the year 1946, to noble parents of Calabrian origins. Her father was a partisan during the Second World War. She graduated with a degree in law at the University of Ferrara. She was subsequently a university researcher at the University of Padua. She also practiced the profession of matrimonial lawyer in Padua. For many years, she also worked as a professional lawyer along with her husband, Gianbattista Casellati. She has two children, writer and bicycle advocate Ludovica Casellati and conductor Alvise Casellati.

== Political career ==
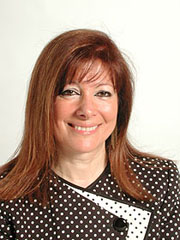
Casellati in 2001

Previously a member of the Italian Liberal Party, she joined Forza Italia (FI), the liberal-conservative party founded by Silvio Berlusconi. She held key posts within the party. In March 1994, she was elected to the Italian Senate in the general election, for the single-member constituency of Cittadella, near Padua. During the 12th Legislature, Casellati served as a secretary of Forza Italia's parliamentary group in the Senate and also as a president of the Health Commission.

Casellati was not re-elected in 1996 snap election and was defeated by the Lega Nord candidate by just a few votes. From 1999 to 2000, she served as provincial commissioner of Forza Italia for Rovigo. Following the 2001 general election, Casellati returned to the Senate for the constituency of Padua. During the 14th Legislature, she served as vice-leader of Forza Italia in the Senate. On 30 December 2004, Casellati was appointed undersecretary to Health in Berlusconi's second cabinet. She also held this office in Berlusconi's third cabinet, until 16 May 2006.

She was re-elected again in the 2006 general election, which saw a narrow victory for the centre-left party of Romano Prodi; Casellati was confirmed vice-leader of her party in the Senate. The 2008 election featured a strong showing by Berlusconi's new party The People of Freedom and his centre-right coalition; Casellati was re-elected in the Senate and served as undersecretary for Justice from 12 May 2008 to 16 November 2011, when the conservative Prime Minister was forced to resign amid financial crisis and public protests.

In the 2013 general election, Casellati was elected to the multi-member constituency of Veneto. However, on 15 September 2014 she was elected by the Parliament in joint session to the High Council of the Judiciary (CSM), where she remained as a member until returning to the Senate in 2018 with the revived Forza Italia. At the CSM she served as president of the Third Commission for access to the judiciary and for mobility from October 2016 until her resignation.

=== President of the Senate ===
On 24 March 2018 she was elected President of the Senate, becoming the first woman to hold this position. She was supported by her own party, the League, Brothers of Italy and the Five Star Movement.

On 18 April 2018 she was given an exploratory mandate by President Sergio Mattarella to try and reconcile the issues between the centre-right coalition and the Five Star Movement (M5S), in order to break the post-election political deadlock and form a fully functional new government. However, she failed in finding a solution to the disputes between the parties, especially between the M5S and Forza Italia.

Maria Elisabetta Alberti Casellati at the Quirinale Palace

On 27 October 2021 she agreed on allowing a secret vote on a law that would have extended Italy's already existing hate speech and hate crime statutes to cover hate based on ability, sex, sexual orientation and gender identity (Italian law currently covers racial-based and religion-based hatred only), by using a provision in the Italian Senate rule of procedures code that is meant to be enacted only when voting on named individuals. This resulted in having the law proposal being voted down, and barred similar provisions from being proposed again in the six months following the vote.

On 28 January 2022, the centre-right coalition officially proposed Casellati as its candidate for the presidency in the fifth ballot of the presidential election. Casellati was strongly supported by the League's leader Matteo Salvini, who stated that it was a "true honor to propose her as the first female president". The centre-left coalition opposed her candidacy and decided to abstain. Casellati gained a mere result of 382 votes, far below the majority threshold of 505 required to be elected and even below the number of centre-right electors, due to more than 70 so-called "snipers" (Italian: franchi tiratori). Casellati was followed by Mattarella with 46 votes and Di Matteo with 38.

=== Minister for Institutional Reforms ===
On 22 October 2022, following the right-wing victory in the general election, Casellati was appointed Minister for Institutional Reforms in the government of Giorgia Meloni. In late December 2022, Meloni announced that Casellati would meet with the opposition parties to officially begin the roadmap towards a constitutional reform to strengthen the powers of the Prime Minister.

On 3 November 2023, the government officially presented the reform which provided the direct election of the Prime Minister, the so-called "premierato", and a new electoral law which gave 55% of parliamentary seats in both houses to the coalition that arrives first in the general election.

== Political views ==
Casellati has described herself as a conservative and a Catholic; she has often stressed her strong opposition to artificial insemination and has signed a bill to abolish law 194 on the voluntary interruption of pregnancy, describing abortion as "a very serious mistake, which flirts with the culture of death." She is also in favour of the reopening of brothels and the subsequent abolition of the Merlin law.

Casellati strongly opposed the Cirinnà law, promoted by the centre-left government of Matteo Renzi, which recognized same-sex unions in Italy, stating that "family is not an extensible concept and the state cannot equate marriage and civil unions." She also added "any parity between marriages and civil unions would be a blurring of non-overlapping models." Following the approval of the law on 13 May 2016, she gave an interview stating that she believed that the Cirinnà law discriminated against heterosexual couples. During the 2020 International Day Against Homophobia, she stated that "any type of sexual discrimination is something to be considered intolerable and shameful in a modern society. Fighting homophobia and promoting respect is something no one—families, society, working places, politics and institutions—can shy away from".

She supports the chemical castration for those guilty of sexual violence or pedophilia, saying in 2008 that "chemical castration is a path to follow as it is not a violent imposition on those who have committed aberrant offenses, but the administration of a drug that lowers sexual impulses." She supported the Bossi–Fini law, which introduced criminal sentences for those illegally entering Italy; she declared that "only those who have the opportunity to live and keep themselves in dignity should be able to come to Italy."

On 15 March 2013, she presented a law for the abolition of the IMU, the real estate tax promoted by Mario Monti's technocratic government in 2011. She is a strong supporter of the flat tax and when she became president of the Senate, she stated that the priority for Italy was a tax reform to support families and businesses.

== Electoral history ==
Election	House	Constituency	Party	Votes	Result
1994	Senate of the Republic	Cittadella	FI	70,207	Elected
1996	Senate of the Republic	Cittadella	FI	52,196	Not Elected
2001	Senate of the Republic	Padua	FI	77,598	Elected
2006	Senate of the Republic	Veneto at-large	FI	– (Note: Elected in a closed list proportional representation system.)	Elected
2008	Senate of the Republic	Veneto at-large	PdL	–	Elected
2013	Senate of the Republic	Veneto at-large	PdL	–	Elected
2018	Senate of the Republic	Venice	FI	118,877	Elected
2022	Senate of the Republic	Potenza	FI	88,277	Elected

=== First-past-the-post elections ===
1994 general election (S): Veneto — Cittadella
Candidate	Coalition or Party	Votes	%
Maria Elisabetta Alberti Casellati	Pole of Freedoms	70,207	43.2
Tino Bedin	Pact for Italy	37,365	23.0
Dino Cavinato	Alliance of Progressives	28,265	17.4
Gabriella Tornaboni	National Alliance	10,390	6.4
Others		16,384	10.0
Total		162,611	100.0

1996 general election (S): Veneto — Cittadella
Candidate	Coalition or Party	Votes	%
Luciano Gasperini	Lega Nord	56,707	34.0
Maria Elisabetta Alberti Casellati	Pole of Freedoms	52,196	31.2
Stelio Decarolis	The Olive Tree	50,439	30.2
Others		7,658	4.7
Total		167,000	100.0

2001 general election (S): Veneto — Padua
Candidate	Coalition or Party	Votes	%
Maria Elisabetta Alberti Casellati	House of Freedoms	77,598	41.7
Paolo Giaretta	The Olive Tree	74,863	40.2
Germano Grassivaro	Italy of Values	7,471	4.0
Manlio Tommaso Gaddi	Communist Refoundation Party	6,000	3.2
Alessandro Lanzerotto	Bonino List–Pannella List	5,465	2.9
Others		14,587	7.8
Total		185,984	100.0

2018 general election (S): Veneto — Venice
Candidate	Coalition or Party	Votes	%
Maria Elisabetta Alberti Casellati	Centre-right coalition	118,877	41.9
Marco Nardin	Five Star Movement	76,734	27.0
Andrea Ferrazzi	Centre-left coalition	66,749	23.5
Giulio Marcon	Free and Equal	10,263	3.6
Caterina Baldo	The People of the Family	2,353	0.8
Others		6,311	2.2
Total		283,723	100.0

== Notes ==
Political offices
Preceded by Pietro Grasso	President of the Italian Senate; 2018–2022	Succeeded by Ignazio La Russa
