= Alvise Casellati =

Italian conductor

Alvise Casellati (Italian: [alˈviːze kazelˈlaːti]; born in Padua on March 20, 1973) is an Italian conductor.

== Biography ==
Alvise Maria Casellati, born in Padua, is the son of Maria Elisabetta Alberti and Giambattista Casellati, both attorneys. Music was always part of his family tradition: his great-great-grandfather received an Honorary Diploma in Composition from the prestigious Accademia Filarmonica of Bologna based on Rossini's recommendation, while his great-grandfather was President of the Venice Conservatory of Music, a friend with the Wagner family, Arrigo Boito, Wolf-Ferrari etc. Alvise also fell in love with music and, at age 9, started studying violin and was later admitted to the Conservatory of Music in Padua, where he holds a scholarship for all 10 years of his attendance. Nonetheless, his family values place more importance on traditional school than all other kinds of studying. He knows the rules and adheres to them, but without abandoning his true passion: music. With great dedication, he goes to classical high school (gymnasium) and Law School while attending the Conservatory of Music. He graduated as Maestro of Violin in 1994 and was awarded a Juris Doctor degree in 1998.

In 2000, he decided to move to New York to specialize. In 2001, he received a master's degree from Columbia University (LL.M. at Columbia Law School), publishing a thesis on copyright in the Columbia VLA Journal of Law & the Arts. This article was later translated into Italian and published in the "Diritto d'Autore" (2003) (the Italian "Copyright" Review). 2003, he was admitted to the Bars of New York and Italy.

In 2003, he became Secretary General of the Foundation for Italian Art and Culture in New York and in 2006 Managing Director.

In 2003, he was General Counsel of ACP, an American private real estate investment fund headquartered in New York (group which is valued above 1 billion dollars).

In 2007, the turning point: urgently hospitalized for a serious health issue, he realized that "if there is a dream in life, one does not have to wait for the right moment, occasion or the proper opportunity to fulfill it. Because that moment may never come."

He immediately moves and enters the Juilliard School of Music of New York and after 4 years, he opts for part-time in the real estate fund so that he have more time to devote to orchestral conducting.

In 2009, he studied privately with Maestro Piero Bellugi and becomes his Assistant for a Conducting Masterclass in New York in June 2010.

In March 2011, he conducted his first Italian concert, at Teatro La Fenice in Venice, on occasion of the 150th Anniversary of the Unity of Italy. In 2012, he decided to leave his legal career and devote himself to conducting full-time.

== Education ==
After his degree in violin with M° Guido Furini at the Conservatorio di Musica "C. Pollini" in Padova, he further specializes with M° Felice Cusano and M° Taras Gabora. He also receives a Juris Doctor degree from the Università degli Studi di Padova, with a thesis on European Copyright Law and the overcoming of the territoriality principle because of the new technologies. He further receives a master's degree from Columbia University in New York (Columbia Law School), focusing on copyright. Furthermore, he participates in the "Executive Management" course at Harvard University.

In 2002, he passed the Bar in Italy and New York and in 2003, is formally admitted in both countries.

Drawn to conducting at the Musikhochschule in Vienna with Leopold Hager, from 2007 to 2011, he participates in the "Orchestral Conducting" class at the Juilliard School of Music in New York with Maestro Vincent La Selva.

Between 2009 and 2012, it is of great significance the mentorship of M° Piero Bellugi, of whom he is also assistant in New York. Assistant to M° Gustav Kuhn for the season 2012–2013 at the Tiroler Festspiele Erl (Austria), after his debut in Italy at Teatro La Fenice in Venice, where he conducts the Orchestra and Choir in the Concert for the 150th Anniversary of the Unity of Italy. He is a guest to important music festivals: Ravello Festival, where he conducts for 3 years the famous Dawn Concert, the Venice Festival, The Two Worlds Spoleto Festival, Valle d'Itria Festival, La Versiliana, Emilia Romagna Festival, Ljubljana Festival, Mittelfest and Baltic Musical Seasons.

== Career ==
As Resident Conductor of the Teatro Carlo Felice in Genova, 2014 he debuts in opera, conducting Il Barbiere di Siviglia of Rossini and further L'Elisir d'Amore of Donizetti.

He was Director of the Ensemble Opera Studio (EOS) at Teatro Carlo Felice, a project where 30 young singers were selected – among more than 600 candidates from around the world – to work as staff singers at the theater.

From that moment, he has collaborated with the most important Italian theaters (Teatro La Fenice in Venice, Maggio Musicale Fiorentino, Teatro Carlo Felice in Genova, Teatro Filarmonico in Verona, Teatro Verdi in Trieste, Teatro Petruzzelli in Bari).

He holds important collaborations with many orchestras:

- In 2011, he conducted the Orchestra and Choir of Teatro La Fenice in Venice at Gran Teatro La Fenice: Official Concert of the 150 Years of the Unity of Italy, organized by the City of Venice and by Teatro La Fenice. Rigoletto: Preludio, Nabucco: Sinfonia, Attila: Preludio, Luisa Miller: Sinfonia, La Forza del Destin o, Sinfonia, La Traviata: Preludio Atto I; Nabucco "Gli Arredi Festivi", Ernani "Si ridesti il Leon di Castiglia", I Lombardi alla prima crociata, "O Signore dal tetto natìo", Nabucco "Va‟ pensiero".
- In 2012, he conducted the Orchestra of Teatro La Fenice in Venice at Teatro Malibran: Mozart, Sinfonia N. 41 "Jupiter"; Beethoven, Sinfonia N. 1.
- In 2013, he conducted the Orchestra of Teatro Carlo Felice, Genova, at the Spoleto Two Worlds Festival at the Teatro Romano: Schumann, Manfred Overture; Tchaikovsky, Violin Concerto and Schumann, Symphony N. 4. Violin Soloist: Laura Bortolotto
- Also in 2013, he conducted the Orchestra and Choir of the Arena di Verona. Teatro Filarmonico: Christmas concert: Charles Gounod, Roméo et Juliette: L'heure s'envole; Mascagni, Cavalleria Rusticana: Gli aranci olezzano e Intermezzo; Jacques Offenbach, Les Contes d'Hoffmann: Barcarola; Charles Gounod, Roméo et Juliette: Entr'acte II; Pablo de Sarasate, Capriccio basco op. 24; Čajkovskij, Méditation (da Souvenir d'un lieu cher op. 42); Ponchielli, La Gioconda: La danza delle ore; Grieg, Peer Gynt: Suite n. 1 op. 46. Violin Soloist: Giovanni Andrea Zanon.
- For the entire year 2014, he was appointed Resident Conductor and Director of Ensemble Opera Studio at the Fondazione Teatro Carlo Felice.
- In 2015, he conducted the Dawn Concert with the Orchestra Filarmonica della Fenice at the Ravello Festival. Auditorium Oscar Niemeyer (due to rain): Cristian Carrara, War Silence; Beethoven Triple Concerto with the 2014 winners of the Enescu Award; Fauré, Pelleas et Melisande; Dvorak, Sinfonia n. 7
- In 2016, he conducts the Orchestra of the Fondazione Teatro Petruzzelli in Bari. Grieg, Holberg Suite; Barber, Adagio for Strings; Beethoven Symphony n. 2.
- In 2016, he conducted Il Signor Bruschino of Rossini at the Teatro La Fenice in Venice and Giuseppe Verdi's La Traviata at the Teatro Carlo Felice in Genova.
- In 2017, he conducted the Central Park Symphony Orchestra in Central Park, New York. As President and Music Director of Central Park Summer Concerts, he started organizing an annual event in Central Park, "Opera Italiana is in the Air," to promote the knowledge and appreciation of Italian Opera through a lyrical/symphonic concert offered to all NewYorkers for free.
- In 2017, he conducted Giacomo Puccini's Turandot at the Teatro Carlo Felice in Genova.
- In 2017, he conducted I Solisti Aquilani with John Malkovich and Anastasia Terenkova at the Emilia Romagna Festival, which marks the debut of the famous actor in the Italian theaters. The tournée then continued at the Ljubljana Festival, Mittelfest in Cividale del Friuli and Lisinski Hall in Zagabria. Concerto di Bach in La Minore, Solista Lana Trotovšek, D. Shostakovich/Rudolf Baršaj: Chamber Symphony op. 110a, and "Report on the Blind," Alfred Schnittke "Concerto for Piano and Strings", text by Ernesto Sabato (from the Novel "On Heroes and Thombs").
- In 2018, he conducted a symphonic concert dedicated to the Day of Remembrance with the Orchestra of Maggio Musicale Fiorentino at Palazzo Pitti in Firenze. Adagio and Fuga of Wolfgang Amadeus Mozart, Symphony n. 49 by Franz Joseph Haydn, Adagio for Strings of Samuel Barber, D. Shostakovich/Rudolf Baršaj: Chamber Symphony op. 110a.
- In 2018, he conducted Giacomo Puccini's La Rondine at the Teatro Carlo Felice in Genova, Rossini's Il Signor Bruschino at the Teatro La Fenice.
- In 2018, he continued his collaboration with John Malkovich and Anastasia Terenkova inaugurating the Baltic Music Seasons Festival in Jurmala (Latvia) with the Obuda Symphony Orchestra and in Bratislava with I Solisti Aquilani.
- In 2018, he conducted Madama Butterfly at the Arena del Mare in Genova with Orchestra and Choir of Teatro La Fenice

=== Opera Italiana is in the Air ===
As of 2017, he is President and Music Director of Central Park Summer Concerts, an organization that produces an annual event called "Opera Italiana is in the Air" at Central Park, New York, and other cities in the US, to promote Italian opera especially among the young generation.

"Opera Italiana is in the Air" has the goal of bringing Italian Opera back to its former standing of POP Music; in other words, music that belongs to everybody and takes it away from the false perception that Opera is music that belongs to the élite class only.

On July 6, 2017 Alvise Casellati conducted an orchestra composed of 56 musicians and a cast of four soloists in a selection of arias and symphonic pieces by Rossini, Verdi and Puccini. On July 2, 2018 he conducted an orchestra of 60 musicians and a cast of five soloists in a selection of arias and symphonic pieces of Rossini, Verdi and Puccini.

=== Opera for the schools ===
As of 2017 he collaborates with the Teatro Petruzzelli in Bari on an Educational Project, whereby he conducts programs specifically designed to bring to the theater students of all ages (primary, secondary and superior schools). In 2017 he conducts "Aladino e La Sua Lampada" by Nicola Scardicchio and Fledermaus by Johann Strauss Jr. and in 2018 Il Gatto con Gli Stivali of Nicola Scardicchio at the presence of more than 20.000 students and a "family concert".
