= Palazzo Giustiniani, Rome =

Building in Rome

Palazzo Giustiniani
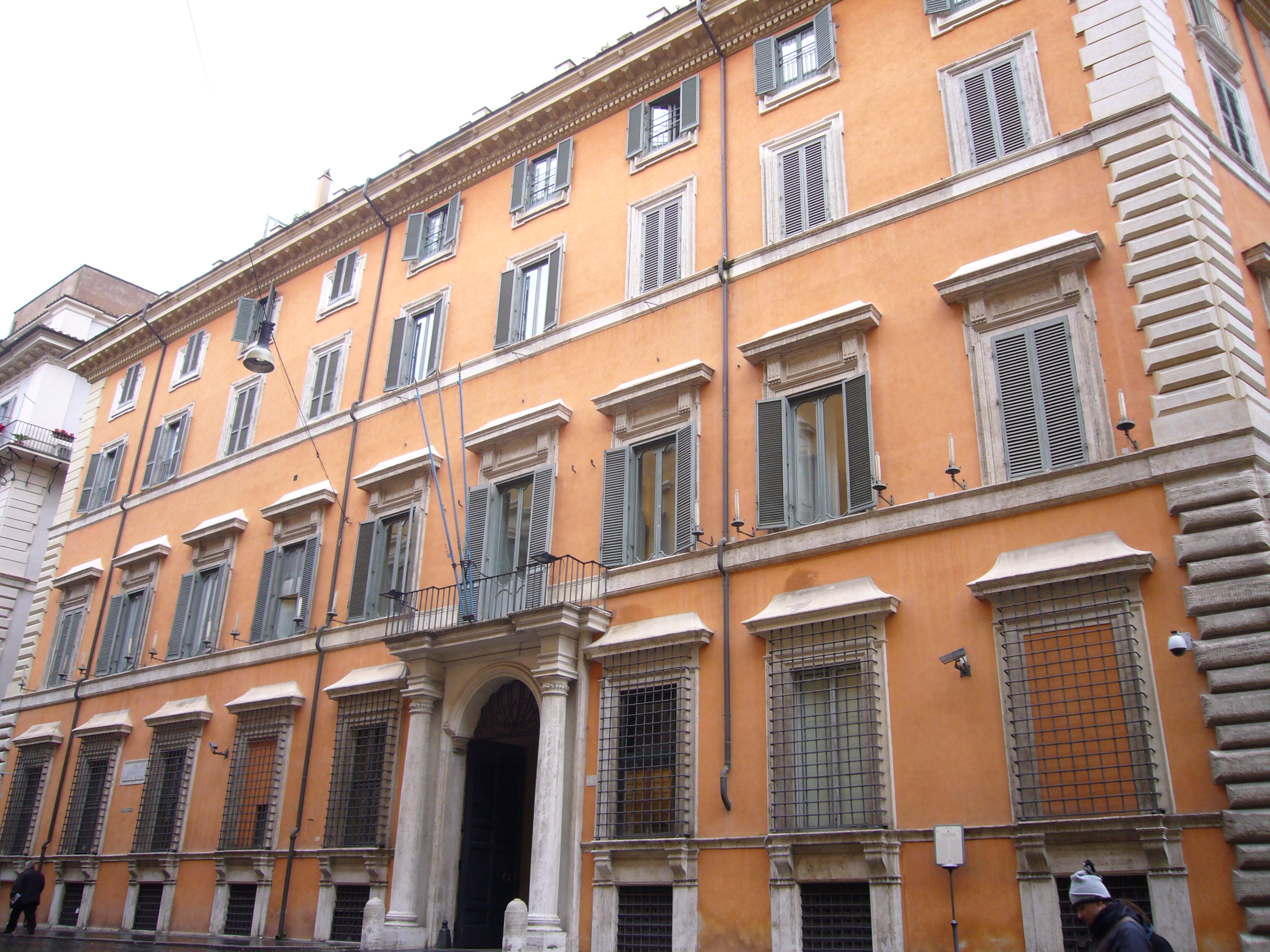
- Click on the map for a fullscreen view

General information
- Location: Via Dogana Vecchia, Rome, Lazio, Italy
- Coordinates: 41°53′57.14″N 12°28′31.25″E
- Current tenants: President of the Senate; Senators for life Former presidents of Italy
- Construction started: 16th century
- Owner: Senate of the Republic

Design and construction
- Architects: Giovanni Fontana; Domenico Fontana; Francesco Borromini

Palazzo Giustiniani or the Piccolo Colle (Little Hill) is a palace on the Via della Dogana Vecchia and Piazza della Rotonda, in Sant'Eustachio, Rome.

The palace contains the official residence of the President of the Senate of the Republic, the Sala Zuccari, the offices of the Life senators and former presidents of Italy, and some administrative offices. From 1901 until 1985, it was also the seat of the Masonic order of the Grand Orient of Italy.

== History ==
The palace was built near the Pantheon at the end of the 16th century for Monsignor Francesco Vento, but in 1590 it was acquired by Giuseppe Giustiniani, a member of the Genoese Giustiniani family who had served as Governor of Chios. His son, Cardinal Benedetto Giustiniani, linked it to other buildings until it encompassed an entire city block. The Cardinal's brother, Vincenzo Giustiniani, acquired an art collection of some 1600 items for the palace, including ancient statues and paintings by Giorgione, Titian, Raphael, and Caravaggio.

The original design of the building was produced by Giovanni Fontana, probably with assistance from his brother Domenico Fontana. It underwent various renovations throughout the first half of the seventeenth century, culminating in the work of Francesco Borromini, who is responsible for the doorway and the balcony above it, which are visible from the Dogana Vecchia, and an elegant internal courtyard, with an atrium containing lowered arches characteristic of Borromini's style.

In 1859, with the extinction of the main line of the Giustiniani family, the palace became the property of the Grazioli, who leased it to the Grande Oriente d'Italia masonic order in 1898. The Grande Oriente made it their headquarters on 21 April 1901; initiates referred to the palace as the "Vaticano Verde" or the "Vaticano dei 33.". In 1917 a person of unsound mind killed Achille Ballori, Grand Commander of the Scottish Rite and associate Grand Master of the Grande Oriente d'Italia in the palace.

At the beginning of 1926, Mussolini's regime outlawed Freemasonry and confiscated the palace for the use of the Senate. Litigation about this was resolved amicably in 1960 with an agreement between the society and Minister Giuseppe Trabucchi, which was proposed by US Secretary of State Christian Herter. Under this agreement, the part of the palace abutting the Piazza della Rotonda remained under the Freemasons' control. The Senate only gained control of the whole palace in 1985, when the Freemasons relocated to the Villa del Vascello on Janiculum Hill.

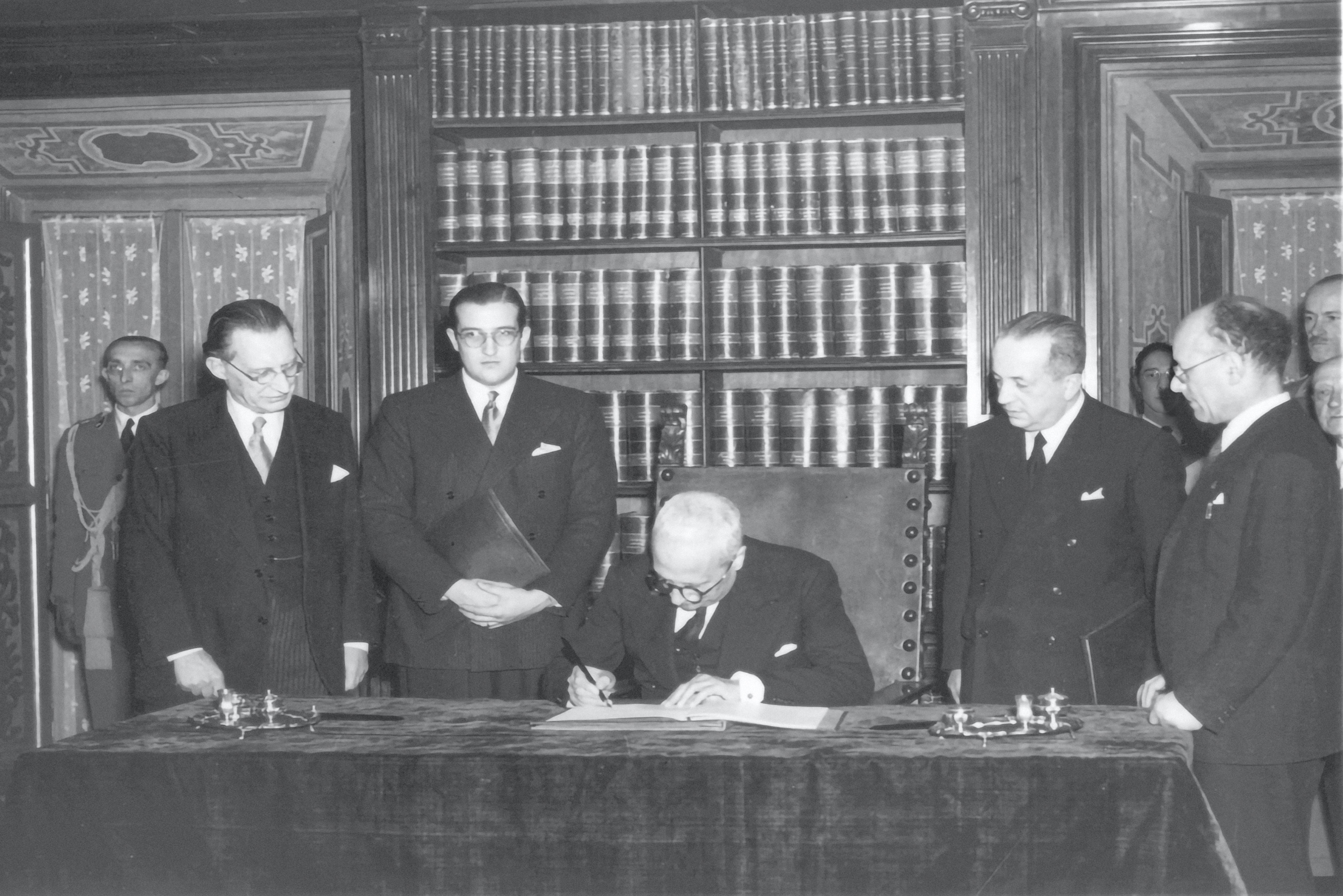
Enrico De Nicola confirms the Italian Constitution, 27 December 1947

In 1938, an underground passage was built connecting the palace to the Palazzo Madama, the seat of the Italian Senate. This tunnel still exists.

The palace was used as an official residence by Enrico De Nicola as provisional head of state from 1946 to 1948, instead of the more imposing Quirinal Palace, which had previously been the palace of the Popes and the Kings of Italy and is now the residence of the President of Italy. As such, the confirmation of the Italian Constitution by De Nicola took place at Palazzo Giustiniani, in the library.

In 1972, the palace was mentioned as the place in which Aldo Moro and Amintore Fanfani (the President of the Senate at the time) made the "Pact of Palazzo Giustiniani" which delayed the passage of power to the younger generation of the Christian Democracy Party, in favour of their proteges, Ciriaco De Mita and Arnaldo Forlani, which effectively assured their rise to the head of the left and right wings (respectively) of the Christian Democracy party. There is some doubt about the veracity of this story because of its similarity to the "Pact of San Ginesio" of August 1969 between De Mita and Forlani.

In 1973, the Communist parliamentarian and former mayor of Civita Castellana, Enrico Minio, committed suicide in his office in the palace, suffocating himself with a plastic bag.

It is customary that the President of the Senate provide offices in the palace to the president of the relevant council for the conduct of consultations, whether they are a member of the Chamber of Deputies or the Senate.

== Description ==
=== Sala Zuccari ===
This hall's official name is the "Grand Gallery of the Palazzo Giustiniani" (Italian: grande Galleria di palazzo Giustiniani), but it is usually referred to as the Sala Zuccari, after the artist Federico Zuccari, who painted the ceiling. It is the only room to have remained unaltered since the construction of the Palazzo Giustiniani. There are frescoes on all walls and the ceiling. The story of Solomon (his anointment, the construction of the Temple of Jerusalem, the Judgement of Solomon, the sons forced to stab the body of their father, the meeting with the Queen of Sheba, and the four virtues attributed to the king: religion, industry, vigilance, eloquence) is depicted on the ceiling. In the corners of the ceiling there are small landscapes, in circular cornices. The walls bear depictions of various female personifications of virtues, all of which are now fragmentary except for "Temperance." The interior is also enriched by sixteenth century tapestries. The authorship of the works is not entirely certain. The decorative cycle which dates to 1586–87, when the palace did not yet belong to the Giustiniani, is linked to Antonio Tempesta and Pietro Paolo Bonzi.

== See also ==
- Quirinal Palace – the seat and official residence of the president of the Republic
- Palazzo Chigi – the seat and official residence of the Prime Minister
- Palazzo Madama – the seat of the Senate of the Italian Republic
- Palazzo Montecitorio – the seat of the Italian Chamber of Deputies
- Palazzo della Consulta – the seat of the Constitutional Court of Italy

== Bibliography ==
- Giorgio Carpaneto, I palazzi di Roma, Roma, Newton & Compton, 2004 ISBN 88-541-0207-5

Preceded by Palazzo Fusconi-Pighini	Landmarks of Rome; Palazzo Giustiniani, Rome	Succeeded by Lateran Palace
