= Federico Sclopis =

Italian statesman and jurist (1798–1878)

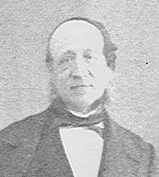
Federigo Sclopis di Salerano

Count Federico Sclopis di Salerano (10 January 1798 – 8 March 1878) was an Italian statesman and jurist, best remembered for his role in the unification of Italy and his adjudication in the Alabama claims.

== Life ==
Born in Turin, to a noble family, Sclopis graduated in law and became an official in the administration of Prospero Balbo. In 1822 he became magistrate in Savoy and later president of the Court of Cassation.

While still comparatively young he was appointed Attorney-General to the Sardinian Senate, and took part in the compilation of the new codes. An advocate of liberal ideas and reform, he proclaimed the necessity for a constitution, and was himself one of the authors of the Statuto albertino, or Sardinian charter of 1848, which became the constitution of the Kingdom of Italy. The introduction is said to be entirely the work of Sclopis.

Sclopis also wrote the proclamation in which Charles Albert announced to the people of Lombardy and Venetia his war against Austria. He was minister in the first Sardinian constitutional ministry under the presidency of Cesare Balbo, and afterwards president of the senate.

In 1871 he was sent to Geneva as Victor Emmanuel II's representative on the Alabama arbitration, and was appointed president of that tribunal. The last years of his life were mainly occupied with municipal affairs and charitable administration in Turin.

== Honours ==
At the age of thirty Sclopsis was elected member of the Turin Academy of Sciences, of which he became life president in 1864. He was elected a Foreign Honorary Member of the American Academy of Arts and Sciences in 1876. He was also foreign member of the Institut de France.

On his return from the Geneva arbitration, the King conferred on him the Order of the Annunziata.

== Works ==
Between 1819 and 1878 he published over seventy works on history, jurisprudence, politics and literature, in Italian, Latin, and French. His most important work is his Storia della legislazione Italiana dalle origini fino al 1847 (Turin, 1840), issued as a sequel to his Storia dell' antica legislazione del Piemonte, published in 1833.

Among his other writings are:

- Ricerche sui Longobardi in Italia (1827);
- Delle relazioni politiche fra la dinastia di Savoia e il governo Britannico dal 1240 al 1815 (1853);
- Rimembranze sul Conte di Cavour (1876); and
- Considerazioni storiche sulle antiche assemblee rappresentative del Piemonte e della Savoia (1878).

== Bibliography ==
- Ricotti, E. Notizia biografica di F. Sclopis.
- Manno, A. Bibliografia degli scritti di F. Sclopis.
- Ricci, M. Necrologia di F. Sclopis. (in the Archivio storico Italiano, ser. iv. tom. ii. p. 331 seq.)

Political offices
Preceded by Ruggero Settimo	President of the Italian Senate; 1863–1864	Succeeded by Giuseppe Manno
