= President of the Senate of the Republic (Italy) =

Presiding officer of the Italian Senate

- Presidente del Senato della Repubblica
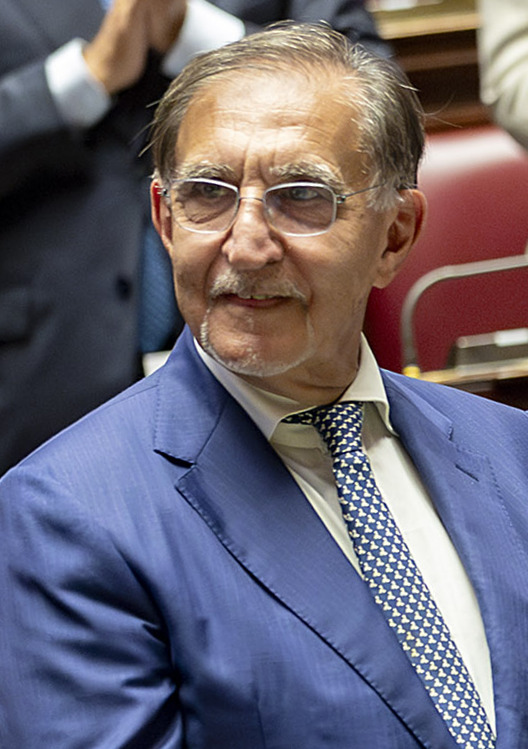
- Incumbent; Ignazio La Russa since 13 October 2022
- Style: The Honourable (Italian: L'Onorevole); President
- Residence: Palazzo Giustiniani
- Appointer: Senate of the Republic
- Term length: Length of the legislature
- Inaugural holder: Ruggero Settimo
- Formation: 17 March 1861
- Website: www.senato.it

The president of the Senate of the Republic (Italian: presidente del Senato della Repubblica) is the presiding officer of the Italian Senate. The president of the Senate is the second highest-ranking office of the Italian Republic (after the president of the Republic).

Since 13 October 2022, the role has been held by Ignazio La Russa.

== Role ==
The president of the Senate represents the Senate to external bodies, regulates debates in the Senate chamber by applying its regulations and the rules of the Italian Constitution, and regulates all the activities of its components in order to ensure that it functions correctly.

The president of the Senate, along with the president of the Chamber of Deputies, must be consulted by the president of the republic before the latter can dissolve the Italian Parliament (Article 88).

=== Acting president of the republic ===
Standard of the Acting President.

If the president of the republic is unable to perform their role as head of state, then the president of the Senate takes on the role, under article 86 of the Italian Constitution. In this event, the honor guard of the president of the republic, the Corazzieri, are transferred to the president of the Senate's residence, Palazzo Giustiniani, and a banner with the symbol of the Italian Republic is placed in the president's office.

While the president of the Senate is acting president of the republic, the presidency of the Senate is exercised by a vice president.

== Election ==
The president of the Senate is elected by the members of the Senate. This election is governed by the Senate's regulations, which require a simple majority of the votes of the members of the Senate. In case this does not result in election of a candidate after two rounds of voting, then the president can be elected by a simple majority of the voting members (i.e. excluding abstentions). If the Senate still fails to elect a president, then it holds a run-off vote between the two candidates who received the most votes in the preceding round of voting and award the presidency to whoever receives a plurality of the votes. If votes for the two candidates are tied, then the position is given to whichever candidate is older.

The election of the president of the Senate takes place at the first sitting of the Senate after an election, which must occur within twenty days of said election. Until the election is complete, the presidency is held by the oldest Senator.

== Living former presidents of the Senate of the Republic ==
As of 11 September 2026, there are six living former presidents of the Senate of the republic.

Living former presidents of the Senate of the Republic

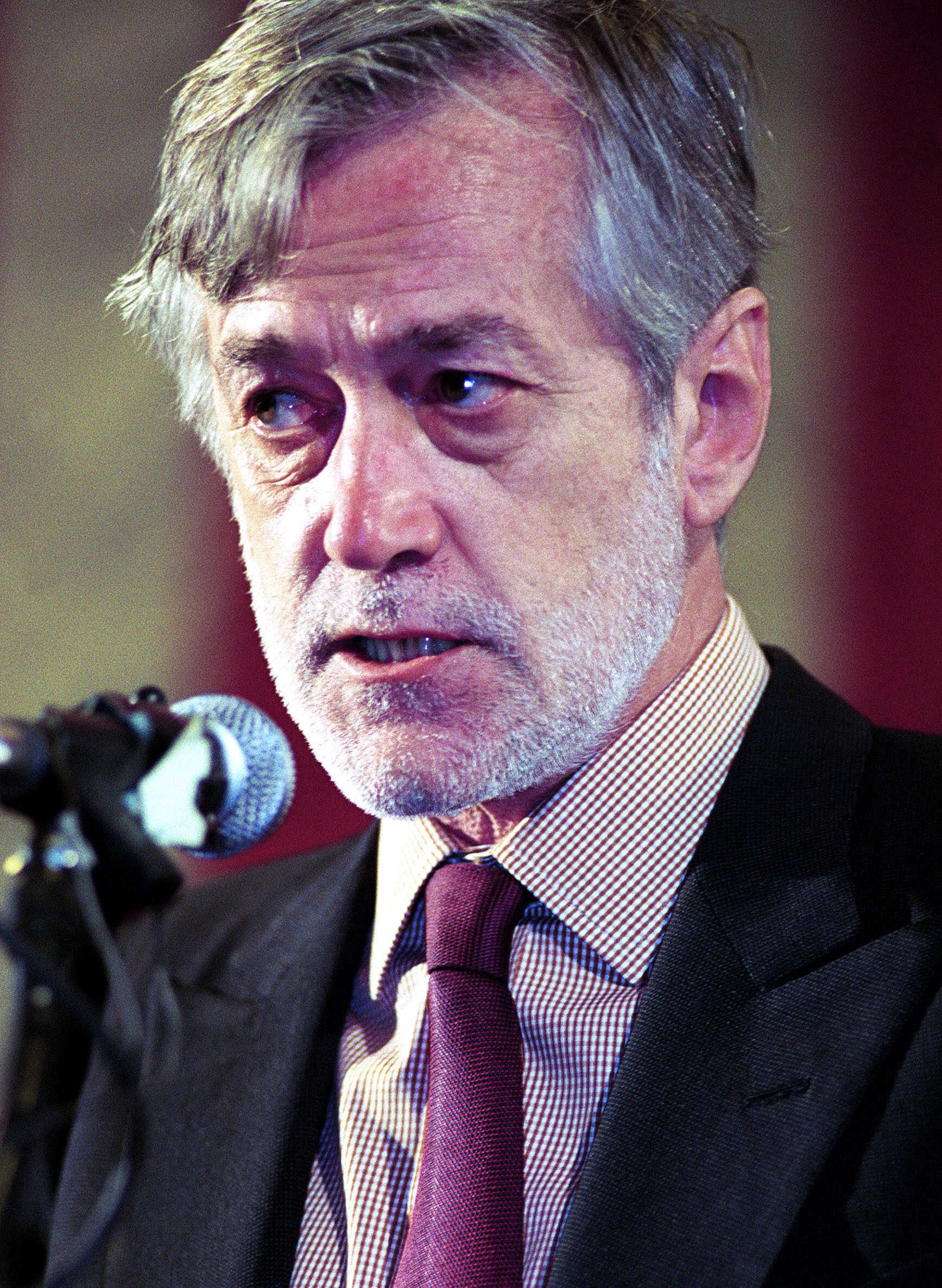
Carlo Scognamiglio
1994–1996
27 November 1944 (age 81)

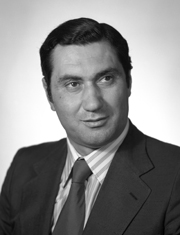
Nicola Mancino
1996–2001
15 October 1931 (age 94)

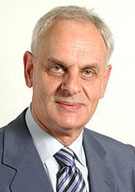
Marcello Pera
2001–2006
28 January 1943 (age 83)

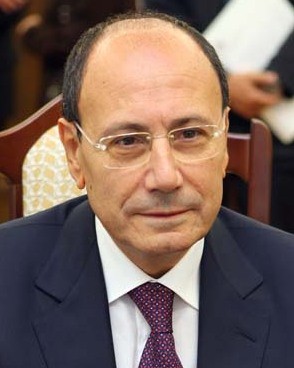
Renato Schifani
2008–2013
11 May 1950 (age 76)

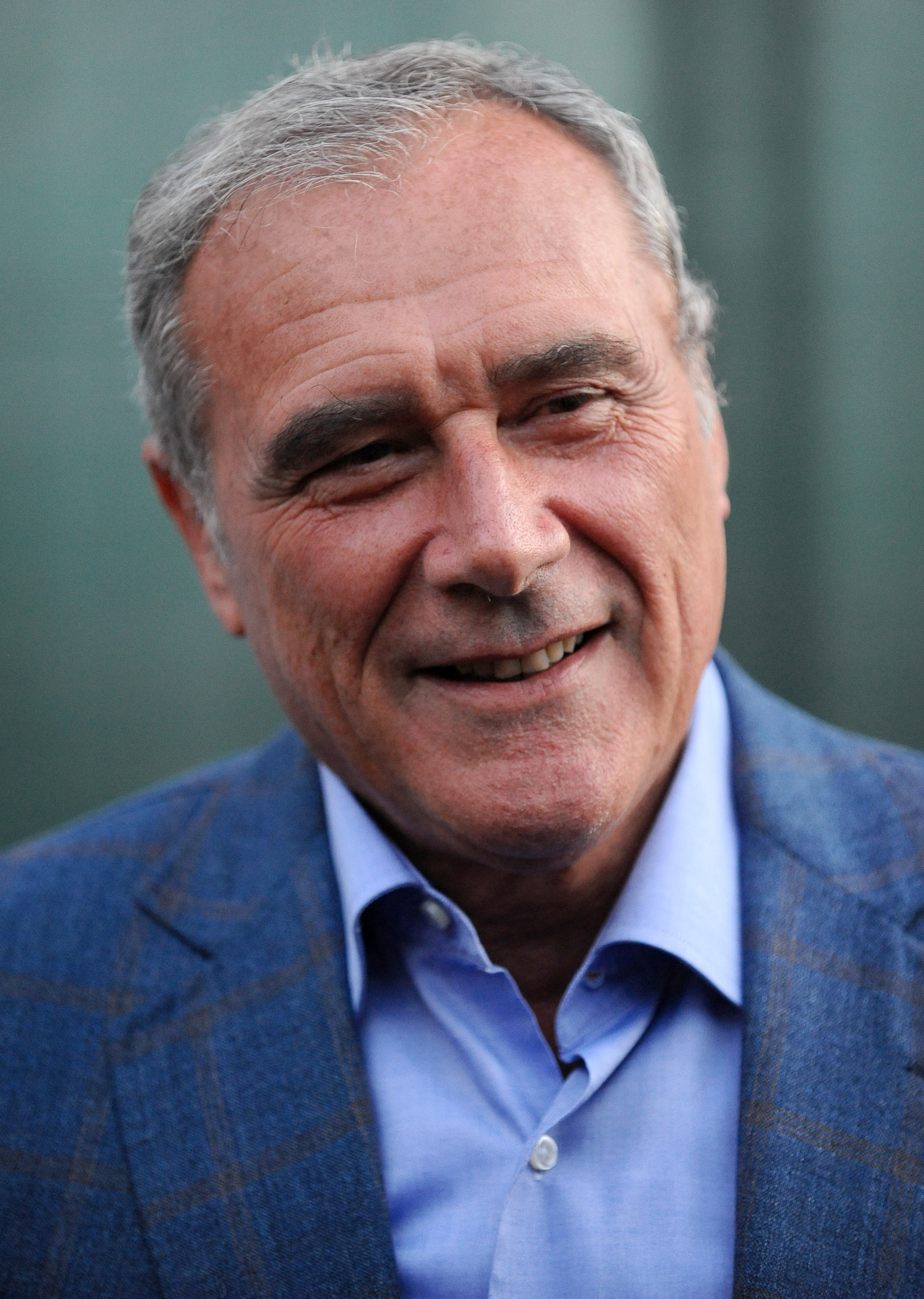
Pietro Grasso
2013–2018
1 January 1945 (age 81)

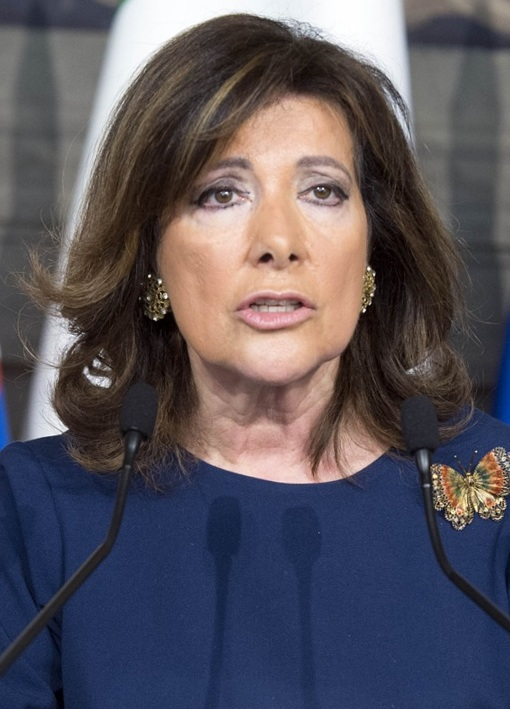
Elisabetta Casellati
2018–2022
12 August 1946 (age 80)

== See also ==
- Italian Parliament
- Senate of the Republic (Italy)
- List of presidents of the Senate (Italy)
- President of the Chamber of Deputies (Italy)
