= Marcello Soleri =

Italian politician (1882–1945)

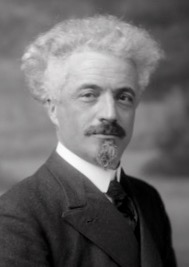

Minister of Treasury
- In office 18 June 1944 – 22 July 1945
- Prime Minister: Ivanoe Bonomi; Ferruccio Parri
- Preceded by: Quinto Quintieri
- Succeeded by: Federico Ricci

Minister of War
- In office 1 August 1922 – 31 October 1922
- Prime Minister: Luigi Facta
- Preceded by: Pietro Lanza di Scalea
- Succeeded by: Armando Diaz

Minister of Finance
- In office 4 July 1921 – 26 February 1922
- Prime Minister: Ivanoe Bonomi
- Preceded by: Luigi Facta
- Succeeded by: Giovanni Battista Bertone

Member of the Chamber of Deputies
- In office 27 November 1913 – 21 January 1929
- Constituency: Cuneo

Mayor of Cuneo
- In office 28 June 1912 – 1 July 1913
- Preceded by: Luigi Fresia
- Succeeded by: Marco Cassin

Personal details
- Born: 28 April 1882 Cuneo, Piedmont, Kingdom of Italy
- Died: 22 July 1945 (aged 63) Turin, Piedmont, Kingdom of Italy
- Party: Historical Left (before 1913); Liberal Union (1913–22); Liberal Party (1922–26; 1926–45)
- Education: University of Turin
- Profession: Lawyer; Journalist

Marcello Soleri (28 April 1882 – 22 July 1945) was an Italian politician and an officer of the prestigious Alpini infantry corps. He is widely viewed as one of the leading exponents of political liberalism in 20th-century Italy. Soleri was a Member of Parliament between 1913 and 1929. During 1921/22, he served successively as Italian Minister of Finance and more briefly as Italian Minister of War. After the fall of Mussolini, he returned to government in 1944 as Italian Minister of Treasury under Prime Minister Ivanoe Bonomi. (Note: "Prime Minister" is placed here between inverted commas / quotation marks because it is under many circumstances an unsatisfactory translation of the Italian term. The head of the Italian government holds the title "President of the Council of Ministers of the Italian Republic" (Presidente del Consiglio dei ministri della Repubblica Italiana). To English language speakers, the Italian language word presidente carries much inappropriate baggage. English language sources translate the Italian title in a number of different ways. "Prime minister" is among the more succinct and frequently used but is an imprecise translation, and one that carries the misleading implication, especially for many mother-tongue British-English speakers, that the Italian government structure closely copies the English government structure.)

== Life ==
=== Provenance and early years ===
Marcello Soleri was born at Cuneo, a mid-sized town in the hill country between Turin and the sea. He was the younger, by two years, of his parents' two sons. Modesto Soleri (1847–1898), his father, came originally from the little town of Dronero, and had become the chief engineer of the province of Cuneo. Modesto Soleri, who had become involved in politics at a municipal level, had been a friend since their school days together of Edmondo de Amicis, with whose evolving "Christian-liberal-socialist" beliefs he was (albeit less stridently than his friend) in sympathy. In 1894, during a period of heightened government nervousness, Modesto Soleri was briefly imprisoned for suspected socialist conspiracy. Marcello Soleri's mother, born Elvira Peano, was a sister to Camillo Peano: this was a political family.

Several sources recall that Modesto Soleri inculcated in his sons, Elvio and Marcello, a powerful sense of duty. Marcello was only 16 when his father died, however, and the boys' mother was obliged to relocate to Turin and rely on discrete support from friends and relatives to sustain the family. Marcello Soleri's father also saw to it that his boys were well versed in "Doveri degli uomini" (loosely, "The duties of men") and "Doveri dell'uomo" (loosely, "Duties of man"), two influential works by, respectively, the nineteenth century Torinese patriot-poet Silvio Pellico and Giuseppe Mazzini the prophet and mentor of Italian unification.

Having enrolled at the university to study Law, Marcello Soleri received his degree in 1903, having concluded his studies with a dissertation on family law, "Vizi del consenso nel matrimonio", which almost immediately he had published. He had only been able to complete his undergraduate studies thanks to the financial generosity of family friends, notably the leading politician Giovanni Giolitti. The Giolittis, like the Soleris, came from the Maira valley. While still a student he had also boosted his income and developed his political awareness by embarking on a part-time career in journalism, contributing to the "Sentinella delle Alpi", a daily newspaper published in Cuneo and owned by Tancredi Galimberti, an ambitious politician who was a loyal supporter of Giolitti (until 1903 when an apparently firm political alliance was abruptly replaced by a shrill political rivalry between the two men). Soleri's first article for the "Sentinella" appeared in November 1900.

=== Lawyer and political networker ===
After leaving university in 1904 he sustained his activities as a part-time journalist, contributing to national legal publications such as "Archivio giuridico" and "Giurisprudenza italiana". Meanwhile, he returned to Cuneo where he embarked on a legal career, working for the legal practice run by Giacinto Dalmassi. In 1907 he married Tisbe Sanguinetti, the daughter of a senior army officer. The couple's son (and their only child), another Modesto Soleri, was born a year later.

Like many young people, Marcello Soleri developed a youthful passion for socialism, which at that time was still considered to be firmly outside the political mainstream by most members of the "haute bourgeoisie" in northern Italy. He became a frequent visitor to the offices of the "Associazione generale degli operai" (loosely, "General Workers' Association") in central Turin. However, it was also characteristic of many enthusiastic young socialist intellectuals of the period that around 1905 he turned to a more unambiguous democratic liberalism, which became the political foundation for the rest of his life.

During his student years Soleri enrolled as a member of the recently formed Corda Fratres, a quasi-masonic student fraternity. This quickly became the basis for a network that would be supportive of his political career. The network of former student members of the Corda Frartres seems to have been particularly powerful in Turin which during the early part of the twentieth century was Tancredi Galimberti, for whose influential regional newspaper Soleri had worked as early as 1900. Following the 1909 elections, however, in which the rivalry between Giolitti and Galimberti was very much in evidence, Marcello Soleri increasingly found his support solicited by Giolitti who was keen to attract the political support of moderate catholic opinion as a bulwark against socialism. Soleri's political networking among the "big families" of the region over the previous few years had given clear indication of his own political ambitions, and the young lawyer now emerged as a leader of liberal democratic currents in the region, backed by Giolitti, and so increasingly critical of the political trends promoted by Galimberti. He also founded a new daily newspaper, the "Corriere subalpino", to help raise his own political profile.

=== A dynamic mayor ===
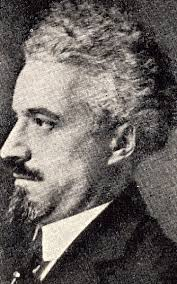
Marcello Soleri

On 28 July 1912 communal elections were held in which, despite being only 30, Marcello Soleri was elected mayor of Cuneo, selected by his backers, according to one source, on account of his electability, combining as he did the dress sense of one of Alexander Dumas' musketeers with the abundant hairstyle of the true artist. As a liberal-democrat, he drew together, from among his fellow councillors, a coalition of support that included radical democrats, a banker, a prosperous silks entrepreneur and Angelo Segre, leader of the local "Vita Nova" lodge. He pushed through a formidable job-creation programme which featured a new "urban plan" which incorporated a fine new railway station for Cuneo, and also involved a gigantic viaduct crossing the Stura (later renamed the "Soleri Viaduct)". These high-profile projects, both completed in 1937, provided construction workers with lucrative employment in the area for a quarter century.

=== National politician ===
Marcello Soleri himself remained in office as mayor for little more than a year. At the elections of October/November 1913 he successfully transitioned to national politics, as before standing for election as a democratic liberal candidate, and backed by a coalition of influential supporters of a distinctly masonic tinge. Also standing for election was Tancredi Galimberti, who made a pitch for the support of catholic voters, signalling his support for the so-called Gentiloni pact, which on the national scale operated in favour of "Prime Minister" Giolitti. In their home district of Cuneo, however, Giolitti successfully urged Gentiloni to persuade his backers not to apply the pact. As a result of Gentiloni's intervention in the Cuneo region large numbers of catholic voters were persuaded to abstain from voting, and because of their abstentions, after twenty years Galimberti lost his seat. Soleri benefitted from those catholic abstentions, however, and was elected to the legislature. His first intervention in the chamber was a somewhat inglorious affair and took place on 5 December 1913: it involved a heated discussion with the socialist Carlo Altobelli. Solari allegedly rejected Altobelli's assertion that his election success had resulted from interventions in the Cuneo region by "Prime Minister" Giolitti, insisting instead that it reflected his achievements during his short time as mayor of the town. He made a more striking contribution on 12 June 1914 in defence of small-holders who found themselves threatened, he said, by new taxes on assets which were being proposed by the recently installed first Salandra government. The coalition was dominated by the Liberal Union (party) of which Antonio Salandra and Giovanni Giolitti were leading members, but Salandra, in particular, came from the party's conservative wing, and Soleri voted against this government almost constantly. He clashed seriously in the chamber with "Prime Minister" Salandra himself in January 1915 over government delays in delivering relief for the thousands of surviving victims from that month's deadly Avezzano earthquake in the hills east of Rome.

=== First World War ===
War broke out in northern Europe in July 1914, and Italy faced intense international pressure to join in. On 19 August 1914 Marcello Soleri applied to the Ministry of War to be drafted into the Alpini infantry corps in the event of Italy being dragged into the fighting. The party leader, Giovanni Giolitti, openly opposed participation in the war, citing Italy's lack of military preparedness. Many (though not all) of the country's leading politicians agreed. Soleri had close political friends and allies on both sides of the "grand debate" and his stance in the ensuing months was also "neutralist", but his position was nevertheless significantly more nuanced and his speeches on the matter less polemical than those of Giolitti. In February 1915 Cesare Battisti, with support from the town's "Vita Nova" masonic lodge, visited Cuneo to argue the case in favour of military intervention, not alongside Italy's Triple Alliance partners but in support of the anti-Austrian "entente". Cuneo was the political backyard both of Giovanni Giolitti and of Marcello Soleri. Both men lined up as "neutralists", but Soleri nevertheless intervened to ensure that the interventionist Battisti might use the town theatre to address his audience.

In response to British promises of post-war territorial aggrandisement, Italy entered the war against Austria and Germany in April 1915. On 17 June 1915 Soleri joined the 2nd Alpini Regiment with the rank of Sottotenente (loosely, "Second lieutenant"). He participated in the military operations in what became known as the Carnia zone and, from May 1917, on the adjacent Isontino front. On 17 May he was badly wounded in the savage fighting at Monte Vodice. He was hospitalised for approximately six months after which, in November 1917, he returned to the frontline, this time at Monte Pasubio. Soon afterwards he suffered a nervous collapse which forced him to return to Cuneo where he remained for the rest of the war.

In September 1917 Marcello Soleri was awarded a silver Medal of Military Valor and promoted to the rank of captain.

=== Twenty years between wars ===
Between June 1919 and May 1920 Soleri served the first Nitti government as an undersecretary of state at the Navy Ministry. He served the short-lived second Nitti government as undersecretary of state at the Ministry of Industry, Commerce and Labour. He was also appointed High Commissioner for Food Procurement and Distribution. In June 1920 a new government signalled the return to office as "Prime Minister" of his old mentor Giovanni Giolitti who confirmed the appointment. Soleri therefore made an important contribution to the parliamentary process which abolished the "political" (controlled) pricing of bread, a fiscally necessary move that was politically unpopular.

In July 1921 Ivanoe Bonomi formed Italy's first Socialist-led coalition government. Marcello Soleri joined the cabinet as Finance Minister. His principal task in this capacity involved the reduction or reversal of the radical taxation measures on assets and on the "super-profits of war" which had been imposed by the previous government.

As a result of the increase in post-war economic and social-political instability and the concomitant surge in Fascist violence, Italy was by now being seen as ever more "ungovernable". That was the context in which, in August 1922, Marcello Soleri agreed to join the new Facta government, this time serving as Minister of War. (Aged just 40, he was the youngest member of the government.) There are suggestions that the appointment had been recommended by the nationalists. Giuseppe Bevione was a longstanding friend of Soleri's. The new government was sworn in slightly more than two months before Mussolini's March on Rome: the political agenda was dominated by the Fascist threat. Within the government Soleri took a characteristically ambivalent position. He was neither unreserved in his backing of the anti-fascists such as Taddei, Amendola and Alessio, nor supportive of those, such as the "Prime Minister", Riccio and Schanzer, each of whom who favoured attempted collaboration with the new force. Soleri lined up with the moderate (or undecided) ministers, including Teofilo Rossi and Fulci. Nevertheless, when nemesis struck at the end of October 1922, it was Soleri who attempted to launch a decisive response to the Fascist take-over bid. On 22 October 1922, a few days before the March on Rome, Marcello Soleri in his capacity as Minister of War, issued an order to all military commanders to be vigilant, and to stand ready to assume necessary powers for the maintenance of public order. He then initiated disciplinary proceedings against Marshal Emilio De Bono who had defied his obligations to king and country by agreeing to command a fascist militia, and who was one of those who had organised The March. Two decades later, looking back on those events, Soleri would stress the firm position initially taken by the king: "Rome has to be defended at any cost", he had insisted. Soleri, like most of the ministers present, had taken that as an endorsement of all action necessary to defeat a siege or attack on Rome by the advancing Fascists. "Prime Minister" Facta, however, who (as it later turned out) had already for several weeks been conducting negotiations with Mussolini through Michele Bianchi, seemed most reluctant to take any decisive action. Soleri would always blame Facta's failure to support the strong line taken by his sovereign for the subsequent developments.

There were few liberals in the Mussolini government which took power at the end of October 1922 (and none after April 1924). Soleri's political engagement during this period was somewhat limited. He nevertheless took care to maintain cordial personal relations with the nation's future leader, while at the same time very clearly separating his own ideals and political perspectives from those espoused by the National Fascist Party. After the 1924 General Election (which thanks to the abandonment of proportional representation and other distortions ushered in twenty years of one -party dictatorship) Soleri agreed to a request from Mussolini that he should intercede with Liberal leader Giolitti to persuade the latter to desist from submitting a Liberal Party candidate list for the upcoming regional elections in Piedmont. To his undisguised relief, Soleri failed in his mission to Giolitti. His own name was indeed included on the party list for the regional election in Piedmont, which was held fur months after the national election in August 1924, and he achieved significant electoral success in the Cuneo district. His more important political contributions continued to be those he made on the national stage, however.

Following the murder of the deputy Giacomo Matteotti by fascist paramilitaries, Soleri vehemently opposed the so-called Aventine Secessionist proposals. Despite the much reduced presence of opposition parties in Parliament that had resulted from the manipulation of the rules under which the 1924 General Election had been held, there were still those who believed that Mussolini's post-democratic excesses might somehow be reined in by office. Soleri argued that opposition members should continue to attend parliamentary sessions in the forlorn hope that the large National Fascist majority might somehow break apart.

The Liberal Party were able to hold a national party conference at Livorno during 4–6 October 1924. Soleri emerged as one of the leading exponents of an anti-fascist position, which put those liberals favouring a collaborationist stance firmly in the minority. In parliament the manipulated 1924 election had left the party with just 15 of the 535 seats. Mussolini's "National List" was able to dominate parliamentary proceedings with its 374 seats. Soleri nevertheless made a number of telling contributions. On 20 November 1924 he intervened to highlight the contradictions in the position of the Giolitti group which had peeled away from the Liberal party to join the "National List", and now found itself backing a starkly illiberal domestic agenda. On 12 December 1924 he intervened to draw attention to the inherently unconstitutional character of the government's "Volunteer Militia for National Security" (known to posterity, more simply, as the "Blackshirt" / "Camicie Nere" paramilitaries).

After Mussolini's address to parliament on 3 January 1925 and the ensuing purges, the Giolitti group abandoned their attempt to civilise the fascist government and removed themselves from the leader's "National List". The numbers were insufficient to have any visible impact on the parliamentary arithmetic, but the reunification of the Liberal group in parliament did represent a vindication of the position already reached, and powerfully expressed in public, by Marcello Soleri. He continued to speak out, using his parliamentary membership to deliver a succession of tough and uncompromising speeches against post-democratic Fascist legislation during 1925 and 1926. He spoke against laws to dispense with the services of the services of (selected) public officials on 19 June 1925 and against laws restricting press freedom on 20 June 1925. On 26 May 1926 he spoke against the "forensic purging" of trades union registers. Of particular significance was the speech Soleri delivered to the parliament on 29 April 1926, commemorating Giovanni Amendola, a high-profile anti-fascist who had died at Cannes earlier that month as a consequence of being savagely assaulted in Tuscany by 15 Fascist paramilitaries. These events led to a complete final rupture of any residual personal relations with Mussolini. Nevertheless, after 9 November 1926 and the exclusion from the chamber of 123 so-called "Aventine deputies", the liberal group continued as members of the parliament where, now, they provided the only parliamentary opposition till the end of 1928. In the next general election, however, only the National Fascist Party was permitted to field candidates.

With the conclusion of his parliamentary mandate Soleri returned to Cuneo and resumed his professional work as a lawyer. He remained in touch with the king till the end of 1940, which was facilitated by the king's regular summer vacations in the refreshingly simple surroundings of Sant'Anna di Valdieri nearby. He also stayed in touch with old friend and former commander from their time together on the front at Monte Vodice in 1917, Marshal Pietro Badoglio, the man who would take over leadership of the government in July 1943.

Early in 1943, with the country in a disastrous situation on many fronts, the king attempted to make contact with any members of the "legal" political opposition to the Mussolini government whom he could find. On 8 June 1943 Victor Emmanuel held a meeting with Marcello Soleri in Rome. Soleri advised the king to dismiss Mussolini and to try and arrange a "non-political" government that could enter urgently into negotiations with representatives of the Anglo-American alliance. The king let him speak without interrupting or reacting, leaving Soleri with the impression that his advice had not been accepted. With the benefit of not very much hindsight, however, it becomes apparent that the king was receiving broadly similar advice from a number of previously senior politicians who had been persuaded into political retirement during the 1920s.

On 16 July 1943 Solari was invited back to Rome, this time for a meeting with Count Pietro d'Acquarone, who as Minister of the Royal Household, was now assuming an unusually political role appropriate to those exceptional times. D'Acquarone informed him that the monarch was coming round to the idea of a government of soldiers and technical experts, to be headed up by Marshal Badoglio. However, D'Acquarone also delivered the news that the men who had led the PLI before the Fascist nightmare were insisting that, with the invasion of Italy now clearly imminent, the installation of a "political" government was necessary. Soleri backed the idea of a government to be headed up by Badoglio, and recommended the appointment as ministers of Leopoldo Piccardi and Leonardo Severi. He thereby drew strong opposition from Liberal Party grandees who were also in town, lobbying for the creation of a replacement government to be jointly headed up by Badoglio and Ivanoe Bonomi.

=== After Fascism ===
The fall of Fascism is generally set at the overnight meeting of the Grand Council on 24/25 July 1943. The meeting culminated in a vote of no confidence in Mussolini and was followed the next morning by the dismissal from office (by the king) and arrest of the leader. A new government under Marshal Badoglio now entered into secret negotiations with the Anglo-Americans. Soleri by this time was back in Cuneo. He returned to Rome early in August and met up with Badoglio and some of the new government ministers. He later explained that he stood aside from the new government himself to ensure that Badoglio would receive in full the credit for disengagement from the German alliance. By this time Anglo-American armies had invaded Sicily and were in the process of fighting their way north towards Rome. By October Soleri was back in Cuneo which that month underwent military occupation by German forces (though for the next couple of years the little town would remain a focus of savage fighting between the still undefeated Germans and Italian antifascist partisans). On 6 October 1943 Soleri set off back to Rome. The journey was not uneventful. Nevertheless, on 12 November 1943 he arrived at the Pontifical Seminary of Saint John Lateran. The pontiff had for some time been making Saint John Lateran available as a place of sanctuary for various individuals at risk of attack and persecution from German Nazis and Italian Fascists: during the closing months of 1943 the church complex was home to many of the most important members of the political class who shortly afterwards emerged as the political leaders of post-fascist Italy. Others included Ivanoe Bonomi, Alcide De Gasperi, Meuccio Ruini, Alessandro Casati and Pietro Nenni. Soleri continued to take part in meetings of the National Liberation Committee, but these were becoming increasingly fractious. Meanwhile, he used his spare time away from home to work on his memoires. These contain pages of great importance for those keen to reconstruct critical events in Italy's recent history, along with some insightful reflections and assessments concerning the political history of which he had been a part. He left the seminary on 6 February 1944, entrusting his manuscript to the custody of Rector Roberto Ronca. Ronca released it only after 4 June 1944 when Rome was finally liberated from the German occupation. Meanwhile, between February and June 1944 Soleri found refuge in the homes in the city of a succession of friends and relatives, taking care never to stay in any one house for very long.

After the breath-taking rescue of Mussolini by his German former allies in September the former dictator was given nominal control over the Italian Social Republic, a shrinking puppet state comprising territories where the German army was still exercising effective control. As the German threat slowly receded in a northerly direction the Italian government emerged from the shadows. In June 1944, with Rome passing to the military control of the Americans and British, Marshal Badoglio stepped down, and on 18 June 1944 a new government under the leadership of Ivanoe Bonomi took charge. Marcello Soleri, now Treasury Minister, was a senior member of it. After five months the government resigned to prepare the ground for the first democratic national election since 1921. Before the general election took place, however, a new government was sworn in under Ferruccio Parri, in which Soleri retained his Treasury portfolio. He was active in finding ways to support desperately needed post-war reconstruction work, obtaining funds in various ways, both conventional and "imaginative". It was also hugely significant that on 5 January 1945 a new Bank of Italy governor was appointed. The post had been vacant since the dismissal and imprisonment of Vincenzo Azzolini. The new incumbent was Luigi Einaudi, known at the time as a distinguished financial journalist who had suspended his contributions to mainstream Italian newspapers during the dictatorship years. (He had, for many years, contributed to the London-based Economist.) Luigi Einaudi combined political sensitivity and conventionally sound economic instincts with a deep commitment to Europeanism. When it came to creating a stable post-war economy that would operate in the interests of Italian citizens, Soleri and Einaudi made an effective team.

The basic fiscal apparatus of the state returned to some form of normality and taxation revenue increased. At the same time there was a substantial fiscal dividend available from the fact that the government was no longer incurring massive amounts of military expenditure. There was no longer a large colonial empire to be administered and defended. Recent price-cost inflation also correlated with currency devaluation and so drove a beneficial reduction in the "real money" value and cost of accumulated public debt. In April 1945 Soleri issued the "prestito della Liberazione" (loosely, "liberation bonds"), a 5% fixed term investment offered to savers: in the (more prosperous and in some cases only recently liberated) northern regions there was a second issue in July 1945. The response was sufficient to have a measurable effect on the national finances. By the end of the year expectations of future economic growth were to some extent becoming self-fulfilling, and even the inflation was dropping off.

By the middle of 1945 it would have appeared that Marcello Soleri was the man most likely to take over a leadership position in the Italian Liberal Party. However, unbeknown to most he had been seriously ill for some time: for how long remains unclear. He died at Turin on 22 July 1945. (Note: Some sources give his date of death as 22 July and some give it as 23 July, which implies that he may have died overnight. 22 July is the date given in the tribute delivered in parliament on 23 July 1945.)

== Alpini ==
Alongside his political commitments, through years of peace and of war, Marcello Soleri was one of those who did everything he could to sustain the National Alpini [military veterans'] Association. He served as association president between September 1943 and July 1945.
