= First Bonomi government =

56th Government of Kingdom of Italy

Bonomi I government
- 56th Cabinet of Italy

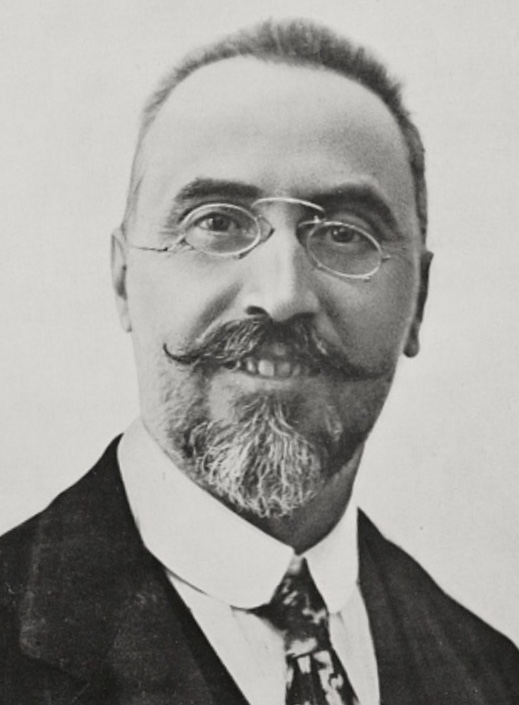
- Date formed: 4 July 1921
- Date dissolved: 26 February 1922

People and organisations
- Head of state: Victor Emmanuel III
- Head of government: Ivanoe Bonomi
- Total no. of members: 15
- Member party: PPI, PL, PLD, DS, PSRI

History
- Predecessor: Giolitti V Cabinet
- Successor: Facta I Cabinet

The Bonomi I government of Italy held office from 4 July 1921 until 26 February 1922, a total of 237 days, or 7 months and 22 days.

== Government parties ==
The government was composed by the following parties:

Party	Ideology	Leader
Italian People's Party	Christian democracy	Luigi Sturzo
Liberal Party	Liberalism	Giovanni Giolitti
Democratic Liberal Party	Liberalism	Francesco Saverio Nitti
Social Democracy	Social liberalism	Giovanni Antonio Colonna
Italian Reformist Socialist Party	Social democracy	Ivanoe Bonomi

== Composition ==
Office	Name	Party	Term
Prime Minister	Ivanoe Bonomi	Italian Reformist Socialist Party	(1921–1922)
Minister of the Interior	Ivanoe Bonomi	Italian Reformist Socialist Party	(1921–1922)
Minister of Foreign Affairs	Pietro Tomasi della Torretta	Independent	(1921–1922)
Minister of Justice and Worship Affairs	Giulio Rodinò	Italian People's Party	(1921–1922)
Minister of Finance	Marcello Soleri	Liberal Party	(1921–1922)
Minister of Treasury	Giuseppe De Nava	Liberal Party	(1921–1922)
Minister of War	Luigi Gasparotto	Italian Reformist Socialist Party	(1921–1922)
Minister of the Navy	Eugenio Bergamasco	Liberal Party	(1921–1922)
Minister of Industry and Commerce	Bortolo Belotti	Democratic Liberal Party	(1921–1922)
Minister of Public Works	Giuseppe Micheli	Italian People's Party	(1921–1922)
Minister of Agriculture	Angelo Mauri	Italian People's Party	(1921–1922)
Minister of Public Education	Orso Mario Corbino	Democratic Liberal Party	(1921–1922)
Minister of Labour and Social Security	Alberto Beneduce	Italian Reformist Socialist Party	(1921–1922)
Minister of Post and Telegraphs	Vincenzo Giuffrida	Social Democracy	(1921–1922)
Minister of the Colonies	Giuseppe Girardini	Social Democracy	(1921–1922)
Minister for the Lands freed by the Enemy	Giovanni Raineri	Democratic Liberal Party	(1920–1921)
