= Second Facta government =

58th Government of Kingdom of Italy

Facta II government
- 58th Cabinet of Italy

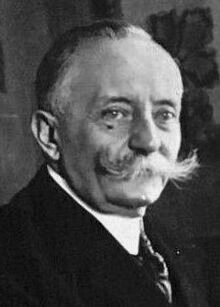
- Date formed: 1 August 1922
- Date dissolved: 31 October 1922

People and organisations
- Head of state: Victor Emmanuel III
- Head of government: Luigi Facta
- Total no. of members: 15
- Member party: PPI, PLI, PLD, DS, PSRI

History
- Predecessor: Facta I Cabinet
- Successor: Mussolini Cabinet

The Facta II government of Italy held office from 1 August 1922 until 31 October 1922, a total of 91 days, or 2 months and 30 days.

== Government parties ==
The government was composed by the following parties:

Party	Ideology	Leader
Italian People's Party	Christian democracy	Luigi Sturzo
Italian Liberal Party	Liberalism	Giovanni Giolitti
Democratic Liberal Party	Liberalism	Francesco Saverio Nitti
Social Democracy	Social liberalism	Giovanni Antonio Colonna
Italian Reformist Socialist Party	Social democracy	Ivanoe Bonomi

== Composition ==
Office	Name	Party	Term
Prime Minister	Luigi Facta	Italian Liberal Party	(1922–1922)
Minister of the Interior	Paolino Taddei	Italian Liberal Party	(1922–1922)
Minister of Foreign Affairs	Carlo Schanzer	Democratic Liberal Party	(1922–1922)
Minister of Justice and Worship Affairs	Giulio Alessio	Democratic Liberal Party	(1922–1922)
Minister of Finance	Giovanni Battista Bertone	Italian People's Party	(1922–1922)
Minister of Treasury	Giuseppe Paratore	Democratic Liberal Party	(1922–1922)
Minister of War	Marcello Soleri	Italian Liberal Party	(1922–1922)
Minister of the Navy	Roberto De Vito	Social Democracy	(1922–1922)
Minister of Industry and Commerce	Teofilo Rossi	Italian Liberal Party	(1922–1922)
Minister of Public Works	Vincenzo Riccio	Italian Liberal Party	(1922–1922)
Minister of Agriculture	Giovanni Bertini	Italian People's Party	(1922–1922)
Minister of Public Education	Antonio Anile	Italian People's Party	(1922–1922)
Minister of Labour and Social Security	Arnaldo Dello Sbarba	Italian Reformist Socialist Party	(1922–1922)
Minister of Post and Telegraphs	Luigi Fulci	Social Democracy	(1922–1922)
Minister of the Colonies	Giovanni Amendola	Democratic Liberal Party	(1922–1922)
Minister for the Lands freed by the Enemy	Vito Luciani	Italian Liberal Party	(1922–1922)
