= Giulio Alessio =

Italian economist and politician

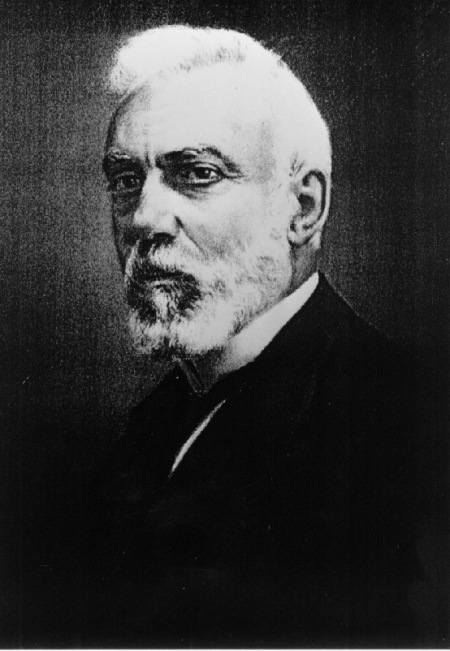
- Alessio, ca. 1920
- Born: 13 May 1853; Padua, Lombardy–Venetia
- Died: December 19, 1940 (aged 87); Padua, Veneto, Italy
- Occupations: Lawyer; Teacher; University professor Politician; Government minister
- Political party: "Partito Radicale Italiano" ("Partito Radicale storico")
- Father: Iginio Alessio

Giulio Alessio (13 May 1853 – 19 December 1940) was professor of finance and, after 1920, political economy at the University of Padua for more than fifty years. He was not yet thirty when he produced his two volume study of the evolution of the Italian taxation system between 1861 and approximately 1900. It was one of several works that he wrote which became mainstream texts during and beyond the first half of the twentieth century. He also entered national politics, serving between 1897 and 1924 as a deputy (member of the elected chamber) of the Italian Parliament). As political parties developed in Italy, he became a member of the Radical Party. He accepted several ministerial appointments in centre-left governments between 1920 and the coming to power in 1922 of Benito Mussolini, whose tactics and policies he excoriated.

== Biography ==
=== Provenance and early years ===
Giulio Alessio was born in Padua, an ancient city which was and is home to one of the oldest still extant universities in the world, a short distance inland to the west of Venice. Iginio Alessio, his father, was a statistician. He graduated with a degree in Jurisprudence in 1874 and then taught for two years at "istituti tecnici" (loosely, pre-university colleges). During 1877/78 he accepted an assignment at the university, teaching students on behalf of the professor-politician Angelo Messedaglia whose own career, by this time, was increasingly split between Padua and Rome. Alessio continued to teach at the university without a significant break till 1928.

=== Professor ===
In 1880, Giulio Alessio accepted the newly inaugurated teaching chair in Finance and Financial Law, still at the University of Padua, also by this time working as a lawyer. In 1894 he was promoted to an ordinary (full) professorship.

=== Politics ===
Alessio's involvement in politics dates at least as far back as to 1880: that was the year in which he teamed up with some friends to form the "Circolo d'Italia", a progressivist pro-democratic grouping which subsequently expanded and was renamed as the "Società Cairoli". A further rebranding gave the association a less obscure name: "Associazione democratica padovana liberale" (loosely "The Democratic Association of Padua Liberals"). Under these various names it remained in existence until 1924. Alessio also served for many years as a member of the Padua city council, taking on the budget portfolio.

In March 1897 Alessio was elected a member of the Chamber of Deputies, the lower house - and the only elected assembly - of Italy's bicameral parliament. Narrowly out-polling his aristocratic rival candidate in the run-off second round of the election, having come only second in the first round of voting, he represented the Padua electoral district. He sat as a member of the grouping generally identified in retrospect by historians as the "Historical Far Left". (The "Historical Far Left" was subsequently expanded and relaunched, following a political reconfiguration in 1904, as the "Radical Party".) He continued to serve in the Chamber of Deputies continuously between 1897 and 1924.

In early 1906, Alessio accepted a junior position as an undersecretary of state at the treasury/finance department in the short-lived Sonnino government. In The Chamber he served as one of the parliamentary vice-presidents between 1913 and 1919, the period covered by the Kingdom's 24th legislature. In 1916 he attended the "inter-allied parliament" in Paris, representing President [of the Chamber of Deputies] Marcora. In 1918 he attended another "inter-allied parliament" on the same basis, this time in London.

=== Minister ===
The election of November 1919 formed the basis for a new parliament and a new government under the leadership of Alessio's fellow-radical Francesco Saverio Nitti. The fragmented election results necessitated a broadly based government coalition which included the conservative Italian People's Party. People's Party leaders vetoed Alessio's selection as government nominee for the new President of the Chamber of Deputies. Nitti nevertheless managed to include him in the government, as Minister for Posts and Telegraphs with effect from March 1920 in succession to Pietro Chimienti. Despite holding the office for only ten weeks, he was able to press ahead with the reforms set in motion by his predecessors, taking an uncompromisingly robust attitude towards hostile agitation from postal staff.

Amid widespread social unrest and dissatisfaction over the Treaty of Versailles, the Nitti government fell in June 1920, to be replaced by a new coalition led by the ebullient Giovanni Giolitti, who returned to power with the advantage that he had never favoured Italian military participation in the war. The arrival of a new government brought promotion for Alessio, who served between June 1920 and July 1921 as Minister for Industry and Commerce. He presided over a series of tariff reforms which had the overall effect of increasing customs duties on imports, while he simultaneously took steps to cut back on restrictive controls over internal commerce that had been imposed during the war.

Members of the second Facta government in 1922, including Giulio Alessio (third from right).

Alessio returned to ministerial office in August 1922 as a Minister of Justice in the short-lived Facta government. He held the office for three months, which was also the lifespan of what turned out to be the last government before Mussolini's successful; power grab. During 1922, the specter haunting Italy was that of Fascism. Alessio was in contact with Giolitti and Orlando, desperately trying to find a way to preserve unity among democratic parties. In his capacity as Minister of Justice, he denounced instances of Fascist violence. At the end of October, on the night before the March on Rome, he joined with fellow ministers Giovanni Amendola and Paolino Taddei to call for the proclamation of a "state of siege", which would have opened the way for the army to be mobilized against the Fascist paramilitaries and other marchers moving towards the capital. But the proclamation would need to be signed by the king. Under circumstances that have never been entirely clear, Luigi Facta, as head of the government, seems to have sought the king's signature, but irrespective of the details of their conversation, the king's signature was never obtained: no state of siege was proclaimed.

=== Under Fascism ===
Giulio Alessio was Jewish (and a Free Mason), which has led to suggestions that for reasons of race he was necessarily opposed to the Fascist government which took power at the end of 1922. Alessio certainly did emerge very quickly as a committed and outspoken anti-fascist, but contemporary sources indicate that this was principally a matter of political conviction. Alessio was a leading politician of the pre-fascist era and a democrat. He was, till October 1922, the Minister of Justice. Mussolini took power, and retained it, through thuggery, intimidation and a certain level of killing. In November 1924, along with Giovanni Amendola, Ivanoe Bonomi, Piero Calamandrei, Guido De Ruggiero and Carlo Sforza (and many others) he put his signature to the founding manifesto of the National Union of Liberal and Democratic Forces, created with the intention of providing more effective opposition than hitherto to Fascism. (Note: Giovanni Amendola, the leader of the "Unione nazionale delle forze liberali e democratiche", died in 1926 from injuries sustained at the hands of Fascist paramilitaries in July 1925.) The next year Alessio added his signature to the so-called Manifesto of the Anti-Fascist Intellectuals, authored by Benedetto Croce.

Parliamentary opposition effectively came to an end in June 1924 after non-Fascist members of the Chamber of Deputies reacted to the murder of Giacomo Matteotti by withdrawing from the assembly. Alessio was able to expand his teaching activities at the University of Padua. He had already started to teach a new course in Political economy in 1920. Time that remained he was able to apply to his work as a lawyer.

In April 1928 the king survived a terrorist assassionation attempt at the inauguration ceremony for "Fiera Milano" trade fair at Milan. Fourteen people who had been in the crowd were killed by the exploision and several more died from their injuries during the next few days. The atrocity was widely reported, and the government took the opportiunity to assert its authority. A large number of known government opponents were arrest, Alessio among them. The perpetrators of the attack were never identified. Alessio was soon released, but the loss of his teaching position proved permanent. In other respects, however, his links with the university continued.

During his final years, Alessio pursued his academic studies and worked on his final major publication, (Note: Giulio Alessio: "Lo stato italiano, 2 vol., Città di Castello - Bari, Macri, 1939. The volume titles are: La formazione del carattere del popolo.; Le istituzioni politiche prima della guerra mondiale) a two volume work on the Italian State which was published in 1939, shortly before he died. A long-standing "academician", after 1931 Alessio was one of ten members who refused to swear an oath of loyalty to fascism despite mounting pressure to do so. He redigned from the Lincei in 1934.

Giulio Alessio died at Padua on 19 December 1940.
