= First Nitti government =

53rd Government of Kingdom of Italy (1919–1920)

Nitti I government
- 53rd Cabinet of Italy

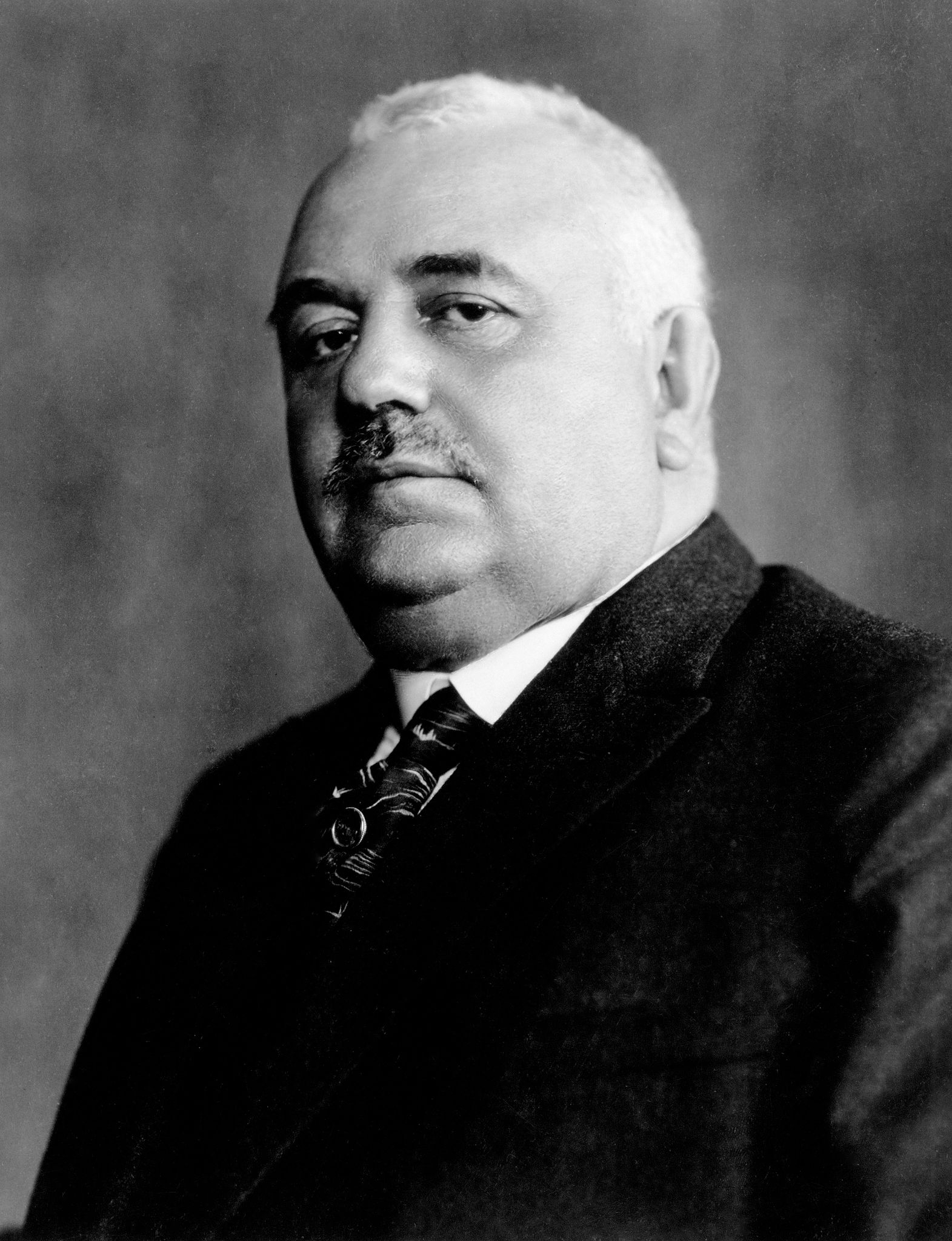
- Date formed: 23 June 1919
- Date dissolved: 21 May 1920

People and organisations
- Head of state: Victor Emmanuel III
- Head of government: Francesco Saverio Nitti
- Total no. of members: 16
- Member party: PL, PR, PSRI, PLD, PPI

History
- Predecessor: Orlando Cabinet
- Successor: Nitti II Cabinet

The Nitti I government of Italy held office from 23 June 1919 until 21 May 1920, a total of 333 days, or 10 months and 28 days.

== Government parties ==
The government was composed by the following parties:

Party	Ideology	Leader
Liberal Party	Liberalism	Giovanni Giolitti
Italian Radical Party	Radicalism	Ettore Sacchi
Italian Reformist Socialist Party	Social democracy	Leonida Bissolati
Democratic Liberal Party	Liberalism	Vittorio Emanuele Orlando
Italian People's Party	Christian democracy	Luigi Sturzo

== Composition ==
Office	Name	Party	Term
Prime Minister	Francesco Saverio Nitti	Italian Radical Party	(1919–1920)
Minister of the Interior	Francesco Saverio Nitti	Italian Radical Party	(1919–1920)
Minister of Foreign Affairs	Tommaso Tittoni	Liberal Party	(1919–1919)
Minister of Foreign Affairs	Francesco Saverio Nitti	Italian Radical Party	(1919–1919)
Minister of Foreign Affairs	Vittorio Scialoja	Liberal Party	(1919–1920)
Minister of Grace and Justice	Lodovico Mortara	Independent	(1919–1920)
Minister of Finance	Francesco Tedesco	Liberal Party	(1919–1920)
Minister of Finance	Carlo Schanzer	Democratic Liberal Party	(1920–1920)
Minister of Treasury	Carlo Schanzer	Democratic Liberal Party	(1920–1920)
Minister of Treasury	Luigi Luzzatti	Democratic Liberal Party	(1920–1920)
Minister of War	Giovanni Sechi	Military	(1919–1919)
Minister of War	Alberico Albricci	Military	(1919–1920)
Minister of War	Ivanoe Bonomi	Italian Reformist Socialist Party	(1920–1920)
Minister of the Navy	Giovanni Sechi	Military	(1919–1920)
Minister of Industry, Commerce and Labour	Dante Ferraris	Liberal Party	(1919–1920)
Minister of Public Works	Edoardo Pantano	Italian Radical Party	(1919–1920)
Minister of Public Works	Giuseppe De Nava	Liberal Party	(1920–1920)
Minister of Maritime and Rails Transport	Roberto De Vito	Italian Radical Party	(1919–1920)
Minister of Maritime and Rails Transport	Giuseppe De Nava	Liberal Party	(1920–1920)
Minister of Agriculture	Achille Visocchi	Democratic Liberal Party	(1919–1920)
Minister of Agriculture	Alfredo Falcioni	Democratic Liberal Party	(1920–1920)
Minister of Public Education	Alfredo Baccelli	Democratic Liberal Party	(1919–1920)
Minister of Public Education	Andrea Torre	Democratic Liberal Party	(1920–1920)
Minister of Post and Telegraphs	Pietro Chimenti	Liberal Party	(1919–1920)
Minister of Post and Telegraphs	Giulio Alessio	Italian Radical Party	(1920–1920)
Minister of the Colonies	Luigi Rossi	Italian Radical Party	(1919–1920)
Minister of the Colonies	Francesco Saverio Nitti	Italian Radical Party	(1920–1920)
Minister of Military Assistance and War Pensions	Ugo Da Como	Liberal Party	(1919–1919)
Minister for the Lands freed by the Enemy	Cesare Nava	Italian People's Party	(1919–1920)
Minister for the Lands freed by the Enemy	Giuseppe De Nava	Liberal Party	(1919–1920)
