= Fifth Giolitti government =

55th Government of Kingdom of Italy

Giolitti V government
- 55th Cabinet of Italy

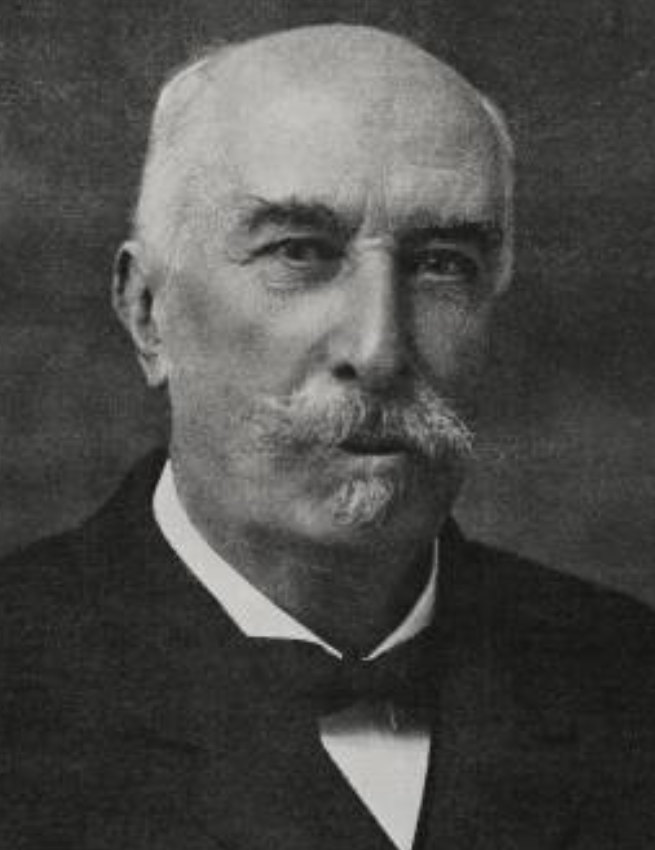
- Date formed: 15 June 1920
- Date dissolved: 4 July 1921

People and organisations
- Head of state: Victor Emmanuel III
- Head of government: Giovanni Giolitti
- Total no. of members: 15
- Member party: PL, PLD, PPI, DS, PRI; PSRI

History
- Predecessor: Nitti II Cabinet
- Successor: Bonomi I Cabinet

The Giolitti V government of Italy held office from 15 June 1920 until 4 July 1921, a total of 384 days, or 1 year and 19 days.

== Government parties ==
The government was composed by the following parties:

Party	Ideology	Leader
Liberal Party	Liberalism	Giovanni Giolitti
Democratic Liberal Party	Liberalism	Vittorio Emanuele Orlando
Italian People's Party	Christian democracy	Luigi Sturzo
Social Democracy	Social liberalism	Giovanni Antonio Colonna
Italian Radical Party	Radicalism	Francesco Saverio Nitti
Italian Reformist Socialist Party	Social democracy	Ivanoe Bonomi

== Composition ==
Office	Name	Party	Term
Prime Minister	Giovanni Giolitti	Liberal Party	(1920–1921)
Minister of the Interior	Giovanni Giolitti	Liberal Party	(1920–1921)
Minister of Foreign Affairs	Carlo Sforza	Democratic Liberal Party	(1920–1921)
Minister of Justice and Worship Affairs	Luigi Fera	Social Democracy	(1920–1921)
Minister of Finance	Francesco Tedesco	Liberal Party	(1920–1920)
Minister of Finance	Luigi Facta	Liberal Party	(1920–1921)
Minister of Treasury	Filippo Meda	Italian People's Party	(1920–1921)
Minister of Treasury	Ivanoe Bonomi	Italian Reformist Socialist Party	(1921–1921)
Minister of War	Ivanoe Bonomi	Italian Reformist Socialist Party	(1920–1921)
Minister of War	Giulio Rodinò	Italian People's Party	(1921–1921)
Minister of the Navy	Giovanni Sechi	Military	(1920–1921)
Minister of Industry and Commerce	Giulio Alessio	Italian Radical Party	(1920–1921)
Minister of Public Works	Camillo Peano	Democratic Liberal Party	(1920–1921)
Minister of Agriculture	Giuseppe Micheli	Italian People's Party	(1920–1921)
Minister of Public Education	Benedetto Croce	Liberal Party	(1920–1921)
Minister of Labour and Social Security	Arturo Labriola	Italian Reformist Socialist Party	(1920–1921)
Minister of Post and Telegraphs	Rosario Pasqualino Vassallo	Liberal Party	(1920–1921)
Minister of the Colonies	Luigi Rossi	Italian Radical Party	(1920–1921)
Minister for the Lands freed by the Enemy	Giovanni Raineri	Democratic Liberal Party	(1920–1921)
Secretary of the Council of Ministers	Giovanni Porzio	Liberal Party	(1920–1921)
