= Minister for the Lands Freed by the Enemy =

- Ministro per le Terre Liberate dal Nemico
- Status: Abolished
- Formation: 15 July 1915
- First holder: Salvatore Barzilai
- Final holder: Giovanni Giuriati
- Abolished: 1 March 1923

The Minister for the Lands Freed by the Enemy was a short-lived office in the government of the Kingdom of Italy responsible for the lands conquered against Austria-Hungary during and after World War I. It was suppressed on 1 March 1923.

== List of ministers ==
Parties

- Italian Republican Party
- Italian Radical Party
- Italian People's Party
- Liberal Union
- Italian Liberal Party
- National Fascist Party

Coalitions

- Liberal coalition
- Fascist

N.	Portrait	Name (Born–Died)	Term of office			Party	Government	Ref.
N.	Portrait	Name (Born–Died)	Took office	Left office	Time in office	Party	Government	Ref.
1		Salvatore Barzilai (1860–1939)	15 July 1915	18 June 1916	339 days	Italian Republican Party	Salandra II	
Office not in use			1916–1919				Boselli; Orlando	
2		Antonio Fradeletto (1858–1930)	19 January 1919	23 June 1919	155 days	Italian Radical Party	Orlando	
3		Cesare Nava (1861–1933)	23 June 1919	14 March 1920	265 days	Italian People's Party	Nitti I	
4		Giovanni Raineri (1858–1944)	14 March 1920	21 May 1920	68 days	Liberal Union	Nitti I	
5		Alberto La Pegna (1873–1940)	21 May 1920	15 June 1920	25 days	Italian Radical Party	Nitti II	
(4)		Giovanni Raineri (1858–1944)	15 June 1920	26 February 1922	1 year, 256 days	Liberal Union	Giolitti V Bonomi I	
6		Luigi Facta (1861–1930); As Prime Minister	26 February 1922	14 March 1922	16 days	Liberal Union / Italian Liberal Party	Facta I	
7		Maggiorino Ferraris (1856–1929)	14 March 1922	1 August 1922	140 days	Italian Liberal Party	Facta I	
8		Vito Luciani (1859–1951)	1 August 1922	31 October 1922	91 days	Italian Liberal Party	Facta II	
9		Giovanni Giuriati (1876–1970)	31 October 1922	1 March 1923	121 days	National Fascist Party	Mussolini	
