= Eugenio Bergamasco =

Italian engineer and politician (1858–1940)

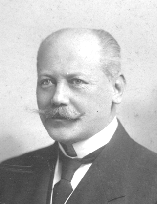

Minister of the Navy
- In office 4 July 1921 – 26 February 1922
- Prime Minister: Francesco Saverio Nitti

Personal details
- Born: 15 April 1858 Vercelli
- Died: 11 June 1940 (aged 82) Rome
- Party: Reformist Socialist Party
- Children: 4
- Education: Higher Technical Institute

Eugenio Bergamasco (1858–1940) was an Italian engineer and politician. Being a member of the Reformist Socialist Party he held different cabinet posts.

== Early life and education ==
Bergamasco was born in Vercelli, Novara, on 15 April 1858. He was a graduate of the Higher Technical Institute in Milan and received a bachelor's degree in civil engineering.

== Career ==
Bergamasco founded the Lomellina Agricultural Cooperative Bank in 1894 which he also headed. In 1898 he established the Lomellina Agricultural Consortium and served as its president. He was the president of the Provincial Council of Pavia in 1908 Then he served as the mayor of Candia Lomellina. Between 1900 and 1909 he was a member of the Parliament. He was elected to the Senate from the Liberal Democrats in November 1913 and served there for three terms. He then joined the Democratic Union of which he was elected vice-president.

Bergamasco was the state secretary at the Ministry of the Navy in the Luzatti cabinet between 2 April 1910 and 29 March 1911 and in the Giolitti cabinet between 30 March 1911 and 24 November 1913. He was appointed minister of the navy on 4 July 1921 to the cabinet led by Prime Minister Francesco Saverio Nitti. Bergamasco's tenure ended on 26 February 1922.

== Personal life and death ==
Bergamasco was married and had four sons. He died in Milan on 11 June 1940.

=== Honours ===
Bergamasco was the recipient of the following: Commander of the Order of the Crown of Italy (4 April 1909); Grand Officer of the Order of the Crown of Italy (25 June 1911); Grand Cordon of the Order of the Crown of Italy (27 June 1913); Commander of the Order of Saints Maurice and Lazarus (7 July 1910); Grand officer of the Order of Saints Maurice and Lazarus (1912) and Grand cordon of the Order of Saints Maurice and Lazarus (5 January 1922).
