= Second Nitti government =

54th Government of Kingdom of Italy (1920)

Nitti I government
- 54th Cabinet of Italy

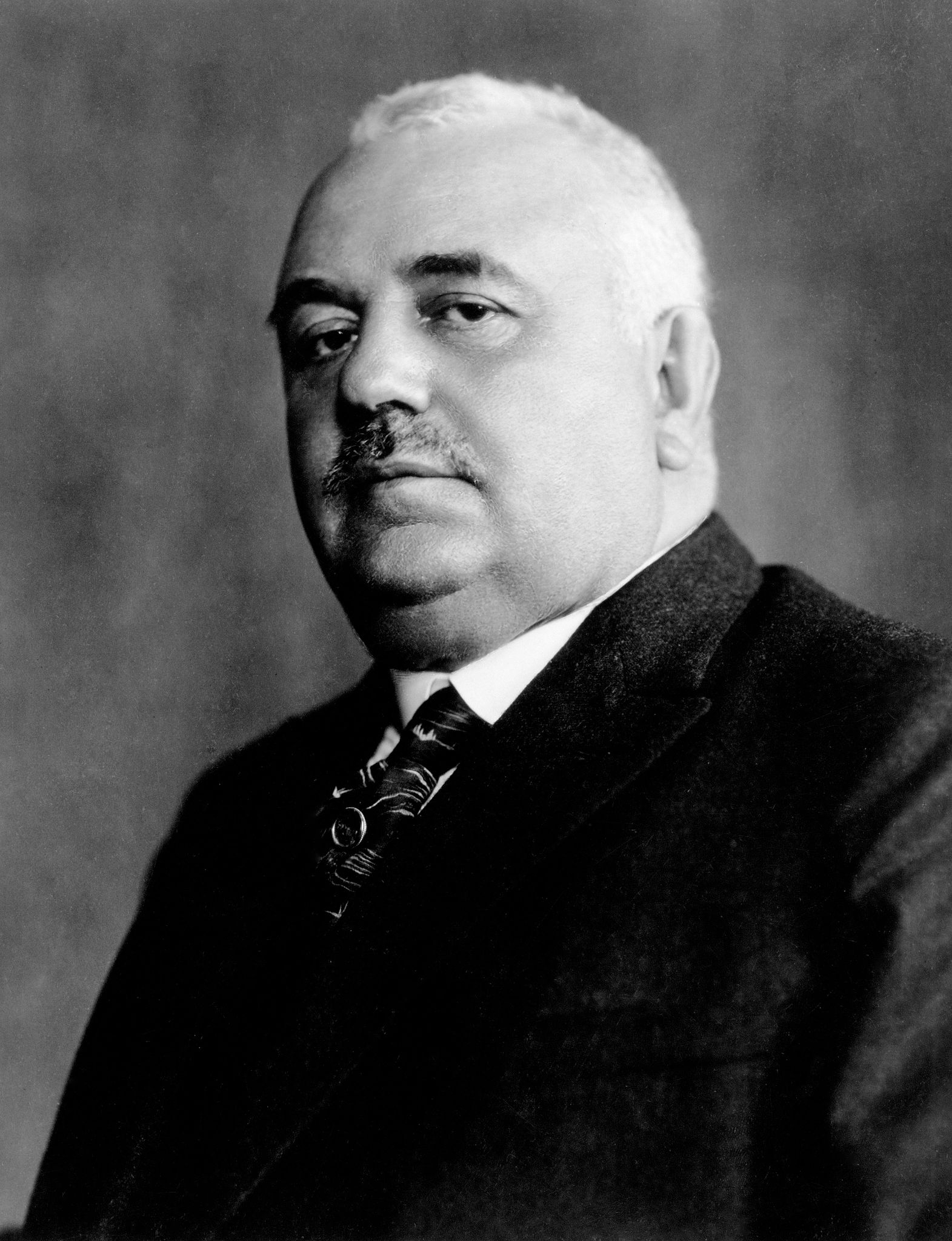
- Date formed: 22 May 1920
- Date dissolved: 10 June 1920

People and organisations
- Head of state: Victor Emmanuel III
- Head of government: Francesco Saverio Nitti
- Total no. of members: 17
- Member party: PL, PLD, PPI, PR

History
- Predecessor: Nitti I Cabinet
- Successor: Giolitti V Cabinet

The Nitti II government of Italy held office from 22 May until 10 June 1920, a total of 19 days. It is one of the shortest governments in Italian history.

== Government parties ==
The government was composed by the following parties:

Party	Ideology	Leader
Liberal Party	Liberalism	Giovanni Giolitti
Democratic Liberal Party	Liberalism	Vittorio Emanuele Orlando
Italian People's Party	Christian democracy	Luigi Sturzo
Italian Radical Party	Radicalism	Ettore Sacchi

== Composition ==
Office	Name	Party	Term
Prime Minister	Francesco Saverio Nitti	Italian Radical Party	(1920–1920)
Minister of the Interior	Francesco Saverio Nitti	Italian Radical Party	(1920–1920)
Minister of Foreign Affairs	Vittorio Scialoja	Liberal Party	(1920–1920)
Minister of Justice and Worship Affairs	Alfredo Falcioni	Democratic Liberal Party	(1920–1920)
Minister of Finance	Giuseppe De Nava	Liberal Party	(1920–1920)
Minister of Treasury	Carlo Schanzer	Liberal Party	(1920–1920)
Minister of War	Giulio Rodinò	Italian People's Party	(1920–1920)
Minister of the Navy	Giovanni Sechi	Military	(1920–1920)
Minister of Industry, Commerce and Labour	Mario Abbiate	Italian Radical Party	(1920–1920)
Minister of Industry, Commerce and Labour	Giuseppe De Nava	Liberal Party	(1920–1920)
Minister of Public Works	Camillo Peano	Democratic Liberal Party	(1920–1920)
Minister of Maritime and Rails Transport	Giuseppe De Nava	Liberal Party	(1920–1920)
Minister of Agriculture	Giuseppe Micheli	Italian People's Party	(1920–1920)
Minister of Public Education	Andrea Torre	Democratic Liberal Party	(1920–1920)
Minister of Labour and Social Security	Mario Abbiate	Italian Radical Party	(1920–1920)
Minister of Post and Telegraphs	Giuseppe Paratore	Democratic Liberal Party	(1920–1920)
Minister of the Colonies	Meuccio Ruini	Italian Radical Party	(1920–1920)
Minister of Military Assistance and War Pensions	Ugo Da Como	Liberal Party	(1920–1920)
Minister for the Lands freed by the Enemy	Alberto La Pegna	Italian Radical Party	(1920–1920)
