= Italian People's Party =

Italian People's Party may refer to:

- Italian People's Party (1919), precursor of Christian Democracy, 1919–1926
- Italian People's Party (1994), the legal successor party of Christian Democracy, 1994–2002
