= Vittorio Scialoja =

Italian jurist and politician (1856–1933)

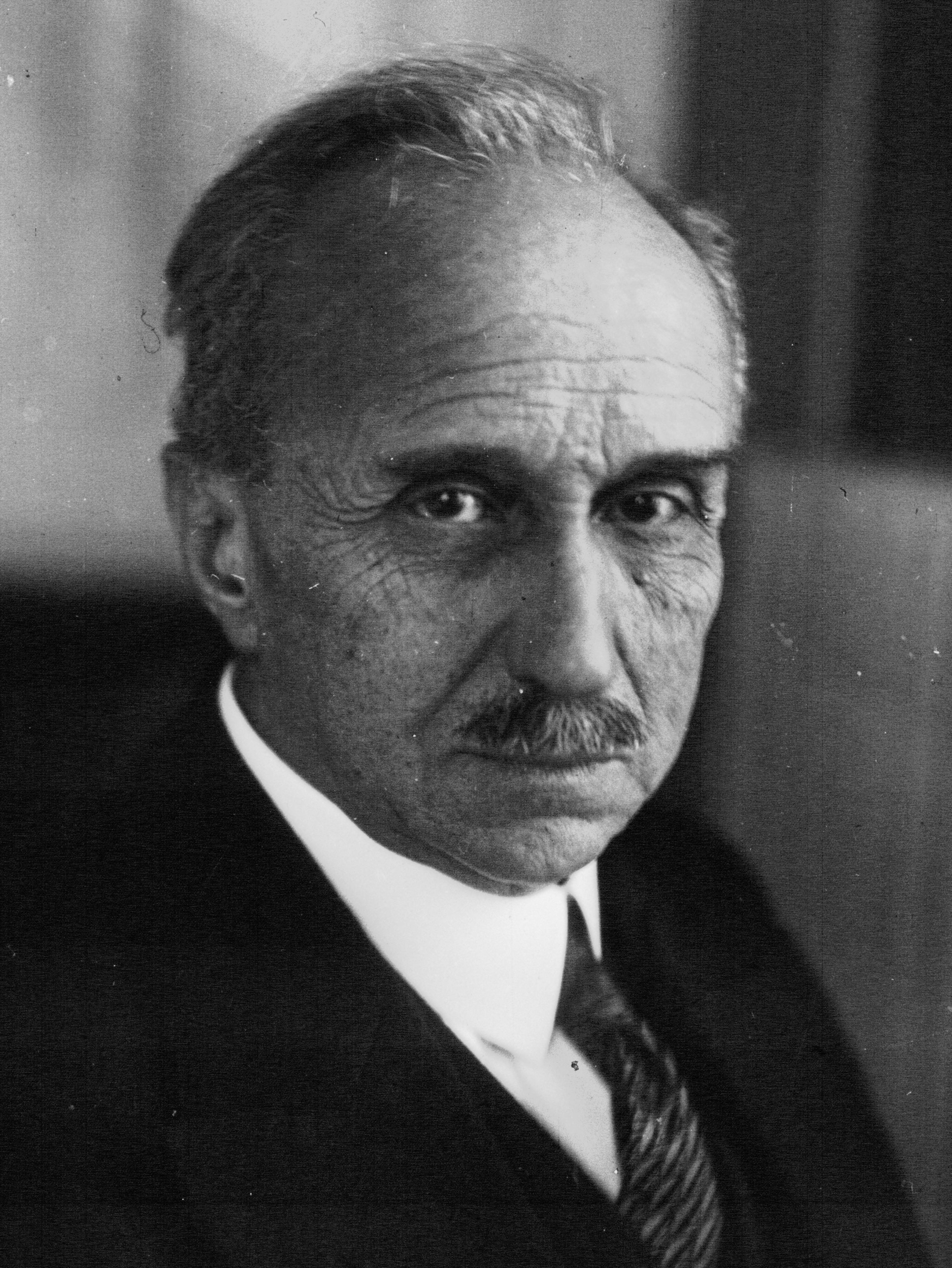
- Scialoja in 1927
- Born: Vittorio Giulio Ippolito Camillo Scialoja; 24 April 1856; Turin, Kingdom of Sardinia
- Died: 19 November 1933 (aged 77); Rome, Kingdom of Italy
- Education: Sapienza University
- Occupations: University professor of Law; senator; government minister
- Political party: Historical Right; Liberal Union
- Spouse: Emilia Pouchain (m. 1880; died 1901)
- Children: 3
- Parents: Antonio Scialoja (1817–1877) (father); Giulia Achard (1823–1878) (mother)

Vittorio Giulio Ippolito Camillo Scialoja (Italian pronunciation: [vitˈtɔːrjo ʃʃaˈlɔːja]; 24 April 1856 – 19 November 1933) was an influential Italian Professor of Jurisprudence. His early focus was on Roman law, but he later broadened the scope of his research and teaching to embrace other branches of civil law. Membership of the National Public Council for Higher Education, on which he served between 1893 and 1913, led to his nomination as a senator on 4 March 1904. That in turn became the launch pad for an increasingly engaged parallel career in politics and public life. He served briefly as Minister of Justice in 1909/10, Minister without portfolio between 1916 and 1917, and as Minister of Foreign Affairs during 1919/20.

== Biography ==
=== Provenance and early years ===
Vittorio Scialoja was born at Turin where his father, the exiled Naples economist-politician Antonio Scialoja (1817–1877) had settled with his family and built a career at the university following a conservative revival in the south during 1849. After unification the family moved to Florence, the new capital for a new kingdom, where Vittorio spent the second half of his childhood, attending the prestigious Liceo ginnasio Dante secondary school. Vittorio's mother, born Giulia Achard (1823-1878), was the daughter of a successful French businessman.

He attended the Sapienza University of Rome, receiving a first degree in 1877 in return for a project "on the Precarium in Roman law". The dissertation was published shortly afterwards. It was common at this time for Italian students of Jurisprudence, especially where the focus was on Roman Law, to spend a period of study in a German university, but Vittorio Scialoja, confident in his own intellectual rigour and inherent autodidacticism, stayed in Italy. He contemplated building a career in the judiciary. Growing up as the son of Antonio Scialoja, Vittorio was on the receiving end of sound advice from a number of the leading politicians of the day, who were regular guests in the family home. It was at the urging of one of these Pasquale Mancini, that he set these thoughts aside, in favour of a career in the universities sector. Still aged just 23, he accepted a position as Professor of Roman Law at the University of Camerino in June 1879. He remained at Camerino for only one year. That was long enough to make his mark, however, notably with his inaugural lecture, delivered in the main lecture hall at the little university's "Valentinia Library" on 23 November 1879. He took as his topic "Positive Law and Equity" (... del diritto positivo e dell'equità).

=== Siena ===
At the end of 1880 he accepted an invitation to move across to Siena, where he was installed as Extraordinary Professor of Roman Law on 18 January 1881. He was still very young, and the appointment was controversial in some quarters. The full professorship nevertheless followed on 17 November 1883. Already Scialoja was breaking out beyond the confines implied by his professorial mandate, and applying himself to some of the contemporary legal issues of the age. Pursuing the theme that he had ventilated at Camerino he continued to work away at the tensions between Positive Law and Equity. His conclusion, in summary, was that the extent of the conflict between the two had been much exaggerated. In the Roman/Italian law mindset of mainland Europe in the late nineteenth century, Equity could only be properly invoked where it could be directly translated into the provisions of the legal systems. It enjoyed no stand-alone status as some kind of an ethical dictate to be applied according to judicial whim. The theme was one which he continued to develop during the decades that followed, and should on no account be viewed simply as traditionalist one-sided legalism. It should be viewed, rather, in the context of the perceived extreme institutional fragility of the newly created Italian state, and the range of powerful "disintegrating forces" that challenged, along with the cohesion of the state, the legal code of 1865 itself. After 1922 some of the dangers inherent in the scope for interpretation implicit in the "Equity"-driven approach became all too clear. Scialoja's voice was raised not in opposition to "equità comune", expressive of a shared popular aspiration in favour of a certain "common sense" justice, and a will that reaches a level of intensity deserving recognition through a force external to the legal code. The dangers came, rather, from the risk of an overmighty legislature finding ways to use the doctrine on Equity to thwart judicial independence.

During 1881, soon after he had accepted the Siena appointment, news came through that Scialoja had been placed at the top of the list in a competitive process to secure a teaching chair at Catania, but he rejected the Sicilian offer, and remained at Siena for four years. His academic reputation was well established by the end of just a year as a professor or Camerino, but he was nevertheless unusual among his professional colleagues/rivals in not having received any post graduate degree. The extent to which he was self-taught was one of the reasons why his teaching approach, despite being both innovative and rigorous, was somewhat outside the mainstream. It was clearly not to the liking of all his students. He insisted on allowing ample scope for the analysis, both of sources, and of connections and associations, some of which reached beyond the confines of the traditional syllabus. This came as a shock to students who had grown accustomed to the more conventional approach of his predecessor, Luigi Moriani. Moriani had enjoyed the additional advantage, in the eyes of university (and city) traditionalists, of being a native-born Senese. In May 1881 the classroom tensions had grown into a revolt among Scialoja's students. That was followed by the suspension of his lectures by the university's Academic Council. (The lectures were quickly reinstated through a direct intervention from Rome by Guido Baccelli, the Education Minister.) Notwithstanding the student revolt during 1881, Scialoja's four years at Siena can be seen as a period of significant achievement. Promoted to a full professorship in 1883/84, he taught several students who went on to achieve notability on their own account, including the jurist and Roman Law specialist Carlo Manenti and the lawyer-pianist Dante Caporali. He established the law faculty's "Circle of jurists" which met regularly for seminars and animated discussions. He teamed up with the criminologist Enrico Ferri to promote the launch of the associated journal, "Studi senesi". Also dating from this period is an open letter which Scialoja addressed to Senator-Professor Filippo Serafini for his "Archivio Giuridico" (study series on Roman Law published between 1863 and 1903) "on the Methodology for Teaching Roman Law in Italian universities: "We do not need to be under any delusions. Pure Roman Law is dead, and while modern law may be descended from it, it is not the same .... [but] far from diminishing the importance [of Roman Law as a topic for study], perhaps this increases it".

=== Rome ===
After three years at Siena Scialoja received the call from Rome. He was installed as "Ordinary [i.e. full] Professor of Roman Law at the University of Rome" with effect from 11 May 1884, retaining his professorship at Rome till his retirement from teaching in 1931. An important step in his university career came on 31 December 1922 when he left his professorial chair in Roman Law in order to become Professor of Roman Law Institutions at the university. Candidates were ranked through competitive process, and he found himself competing directly for the appointment with several of the later Serafini's most eminent and influential pupils. Initially he missed out on the appointment, but then the exercise undertaken and conclusions reached by the Examining Commission were voided through a ministerial intervention. Admirers assert that the eminence and respect which Scialoja earned during his years at Rome, both for his work the field of Roman Law and in legal scholarship more broadly, raised the status of Legal Studies across Italy and amply justified his appointment. Without in any way renouncing his own successes in civil and administrative law, he also became increasingly prominent in the interface between practical law work and the politics of the profession. Along with his involvement, after 1904, as a senator, he accepted membership of numerous advisory councils and public committees concerned with legal and educational institutions and their interactions with society more broadly, frequently taking a leading role.

Three years after his arrival at La Sapienza, Scialoja inaugurated the university's Institute of Roman Law, himself taking on the role of "institute secretary in perpetuity". Those invited to join included not just the Roman Law specialists, but also interested archaeologists and classical historians. Quite soon the Institute absorbed the Italian Society for the Increase of Romanistic Studies, a parallel but less dynamic organisation – some might have characterised it as a rival institution, which had been set up by Lando Landucci (1855–1937) at Padua. Lando Landucci was a leading representative of the "Serafini school" of Roman Law, and had himself been a contender for the Rome professorship at the time of Scialoja's appointment. The incorporation of Landucci's organisation into the new institute could therefore be characterised as another blow against Serafini's followers. Directly after establishing the institute, in 1888, Scialoja launched the "Bullettino dell’Istituto di diritto romano", a specialist periodical dedicated to Roman Law, which has acquired a life of its own, and is still published annually.

In terms of building up the university law school Scialoja displayed an exceptional ability, not merely through his rare teaching talents, but also in his selection and training of young scholars. The extent to which his students subsequently achieved notability as leading legal academics meant that Scialoja's impact on the application and development of The Law in Italy was enduring and profound. Those whom he taught and/or powerfully influenced included Roman Law professors such as Pietro Bonfante (1864-1932), Gino Segrè (1864–1942), Salvatore Riccobono (1864–1958), Carlo Longo (1869–1938), Sirio Solazzi (1875-1957) and Vincenzo Arangio-Ruiz (1884-1964).

=== Civil law reform? ===
In 1924 Scialoja accepted an invitation to serve as president over the first of four sub-commissions appointed by the royal commission mandated to draw up a revised legal code (codice civile or "civil code"), in order to build on and supplement that of 1865. Although Scialoja's sub-committee was instructed to work on "civil law", it would also trespass constructively into the field of civil court procedure. In practical terms, however, the entire exercise had little short-term impact, although a draft for a new civil code was published in 1930. The commission work might, under different political circumstances, have been used as the opportunity for a deep and comprehensive revision of the existing situation, but that opportunity was not grasped. It is hard to think that it was for lack of any lack of experience, energy, and intellectual capacity on the part of the sub-commission president and members, that the impact on Italian civil law was at best fragmentary and formalised. Commentators conclude that, despite frequent attempts by Scialoja to solicit input from the government, even after the Matteotti assassination which horrified the Italian legal and academic establishments, the leader was uninterested and government members were reluctant to engage in discussion of substantive reforms to the code. Scialoja accordingly tried to resist any wide-ranging redefinition of "private law", which at that time could only have been viewed as a fundamental distortion of an established structure, with a liberal impetus which would have served only to encourage and hasten the already pervasive infiltration of totalitarian, corporatist and interventionist principles that was a feature of Mussolini's Italy. Such considerations lay behind the "incorrigible scepticism" (invincibile scetticismo) with which Scialoja was reproached by the Fascist Foreign Minister Dino Grandi (with whom he was evidently on at least moderately cordial terms) when, during the course of this process, the two men found themselves on opposite sides of the argument over the still unresolved question of whether or not the justice system should be clearly separated from politics. Scialoja therefore came to see it as his principal objective as president of the sub-committee on Civil Law reform, to avoid upending the Civil Code of 1865, in ways that would facilitate the intensification of Fascist control over the lives of individuals. In this, he largely succeeded.

=== Senator ===
By 1904 Vittorio Scialoja had acquired a relatively high public profile as a Rome-based law professor. On 4 March 1904 he was appointed to the senate by the new king. The appointment was validated (confirmed) by senators on 21 March 1904. Before 1947 those appointed to the senate retained their senate seats for life, and Scialoja's role in national politics became an important element in his contribution to public life between 1904 and his death in 1933.

He served as mayor for the little island of Procida between 1914 and 1925, apart from a nine month hiatus during 1920. Positioned in the Bay of Naples between Ischia and the mainland, the island had great family significance, being seen as the "point of origin" of his father's family: the Scialojas had been prominent on the island since at least as far back as the seventeenth century. He also served, for a time, as a Rome city councillor.

In 1915 the Italian government was persuaded to lead the country into the First World War, not alongside its triple alliance partners but alongside "liberal" France and her Russian and British allies. The decision was, and remained, controversial, though there were many who were, at least, relieved that Italy was not aligned in the fighting on the same side as their former colonisers in Vienna. In the Senate, Scialoja emerged as a powerful advocate of participation in the war. Three years later, it turned out that Italy had backed the winning side, and the decision to participate had also secured for the Italian government a position of some influence at the Versailles Peace Conference, intended by the victorious Great Powers to redraw the map of Europe for the twentieth century, just as the Congress of Vienna had set out to define nineteenth century Europe back in 1815. Senator Scialoja attended the peace conference as a member of the little Italian delegation under the leadership of Foreign Minister Sidney Sonnino. He then served between 1921 and 1932 as Italy's principal delegate to the League of Nations (to the "covenant" of which he had himself contributed) in Geneva, winning plaudits from colleagues and commentators for the quickness of intellect, legal rigour and breadth of knowledge that he brought to the role. During this period, on 4 October 1926, he was appointed as a "Minister of State".

=== Minister ===
On 11 December 1909 he joined the centre-right Sonnino government as Minister of Justice. The government arrived in office with a conservative reform agenda which, taken in aggregate, won the overwhelming support in parliament. However it ran into opposition, as its predecessor had done, over a package of proposals intended to expand and develop the Italian sea transport sector, and without bothering with a parliamentary vote which he seemed likely to lose vote Sonnino resigned his government after just 110 days. This put an end to Scialoja's first ministerial career on 31 March 1910, after just 110 days.

He returned to government, now under the leadership of Paolo Boselli, on 19 June 1916. The government was broadly based, reflecting the need to try and maximise support for the country's participation in the war. There were no fewer than seven ministers "without portfolio", of whom Vittorio Scialoja was one. Notwithstanding the uninformative ministerial title, historians with the benefit of hindsight identify Scialoja as the Minister for Propaganda in Boselli's government and / or as Italy's first Minister of Propaganda and the Press Abroad. His persuasive skills and strong belief in Italian participation in the war made the appointment a particularly appropriate one. The Boselli government lasted for nearly eighteenth months, during which Boselli robustly defended Marshall Cadorna and the other army commanders from parliamentary scrutiny. The government was unable to avoid its share of responsibility for the military catastrophe at Caporetto, however, and resigned with effect from 29 October 1917. Scialoja's government duties were taken on by Romeo Gallenga Stuart under the next administration.

Scialoja's third ministerial term came in 1919. When Nitti created his first government he selected Tommaso Tittoni as his Foreign Minister, but Tittoni's health began to break down, probably on account of the strain imposed by the Paris Peace Conference, and Nitti found himself serving as his own Foreign Minister for several months. Sources differ over precise timelines, but in around November 1919 Vittorio Scialoja, who was already a key member of the little Italian delegation at Versailles, took over the Foreign Affairs portfolio, serving till 15 June 1920, following the collapse of the short-lived and terminally divided Nitti government.

=== Final years ===
Scialoja retired from his university teaching in 1931, by which time he was 75. His health declined rapidly and visibly during the next couple of years. He died at Rome on 19 November 1933.

== Memberships ==
Vittorio Scialoja acquired a number of honorary professorships within Italy and abroad, and was also a member of various learned societies and associations. The most significant of these, probably, was the Rome-based Accademia dei Lincei of which he became a corresponding member on 15 July 1901 and a full member on 19 April 1918. Between 1923 and 1926 and again for a year between July 1932 and 1933 he served as vice-president of the Accademia, while holding the presidency between 1926 and 1932 and again, during the final months of his life, between July and November 1933.

On the eve of the inauguration of the Centenary in April 2026, UNIDROIT published Attualità di Vittorio Scialoja (Vittorio Scialoja’s Contemporary Relevance), a collection of essays (both in the original Italian and translated into English) that delve into the history and lasting impact of the founder and first President of UNIDROIT.

== Recognition ==
- 1889: Cavaliere dell'Ordine dei SS. Maurizio e Lazzaro
- 1893: Ufficiale dell'Ordine dei SS. Maurizio e Lazzaro
- 1904: Commendatore dell'Ordine della Corona d'Italia
- 1906: Commendatore dell'Ordine dei SS. Maurizio e Lazzaro
- 1906: Grande Ufficiale dell'Ordine della Corona d'Italia
- 1911: Grande ufficiale dell'Ordine dei SS. Maurizio e Lazzaro
- 1915: Gran cordone dell'Ordine della Corona d'Italia
- 1916: Gran cordone dell'Ordine dei SS. Maurizio e Lazzaro
- 1927 Cavaliere di Gran Croce Ordine del Leone bianco
