= Alfredo Falcioni =

Italian politician

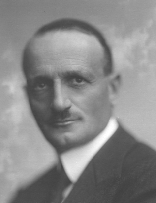

Minister of Justice
- In office 21 May 1920 – 15 June 1920
- Preceded by: Lodovico Mortara
- Succeeded by: Luigi Fera

Minister of Agriculture
- In office 14 March 1920 – 21 May 1920
- Preceded by: Achille Visocchi
- Succeeded by: Giuseppe Micheli

Senator
- In office 2 March 1929 – 4 July 1936

Member of the Chamber of Deputies
- In office 16 June 1900 – 25 January 1924

Alfredo Falcioni (Cuzzego, Domodossola 9 June 1868 – Ghiffa, 4 July 1936) was an Italian politician. He was a lawyer, councilor and president of the provincial council of Novara. Elected to the Chamber of Deputies in 1900, he was loyal to Giovanni Giolitti and was re-elected continuously until 1924.

== Ministerial career ==
In 1920 Falcioni became Minister of Agriculture in the first Nitti government. Despite his brief term of office he played a politically important role related to decree no. 515 of 22 April. 1920, about the concession of lands. The period was characterized by intense peasant struggles and land occupations. An attempt to regulate these had been made by his ministerial predecessor, it:Achille Visocchi, who had issued a decree on 2 September 1919 giving prefects the power to authorize the occupation of uncultivated land by agrarian associations or agricultural bodies. This measure had proven inadequate to deal with the emergency and had actually encouraged further land invasions. As soon as he took office, Falcioni promulgated a new decree establishing that concessions of land could only be made for the benefit of associations or bodies that already practiced land cultivation (such as the Opera Nazionale Combattenti).

Falcioni’s decree also removed the requirement for authorization of land takeovers by the prefect and delegated it to special provincial technical commissions, in which the owners and workers were equally represented. The ban on subletting was also reiterated and criminal sanctions were put in place for unauthorised occupations. The temporary occupation of land could be made permanent after two years, by royal decree, if the land was capable of major improvement and was being cultivated using recognised techniques. On 11 May 1920 Falcioni presented to the Chamber his bill on land concessions but, ten days later the government resigned and his successor at the Ministry of Agriculture, Giuseppe Micheli failed to carry it into law. In the event the land occupation movement had almost completely subsided by the autumn of 1920, so no new legislation was forthcoming.

Falcioni was also Minister of Justice in the second Nitti government but this lasted only a few weeks.

== The Commission of Eighteen ==
After Mussolini came to power, Falcioni was a member of the parliamentary commission (known as “the Commission of Eighteen (Italian: Comitato dei Diciotto) responsible for examining the bill known as the Acerbo Law. This assigned a two-thirds majority in the Chamber of Deputies, thereby ensuring the rule of the National Fascist Party. Falcioni voted against the bill in the commission, but approved it when it was put to the vote in the Chamber on 21 July 1923.

He was appointed senator in 1929. In 1932 he joined the National Fascist Party.

He is buried in the family tomb of Cuzzego, a small hamlet in the municipality of Beura-Cardezza.

== Honours ==
Cavaliere di Gran Croce dell'Ordine della Corona d'Italia - ribbon for ordinary uniform

Knight Grand Cross of the Order of the Crown of Italy

Grand'Ufficiale dell'Ordine dei Santi Maurizio e Lazzaro - ribbon for ordinary uniform

Grand Officer of the Order of Saints Maurice and Lazarus
