= Angelo Mauri =

Italian journalist and politician (1873–1936)

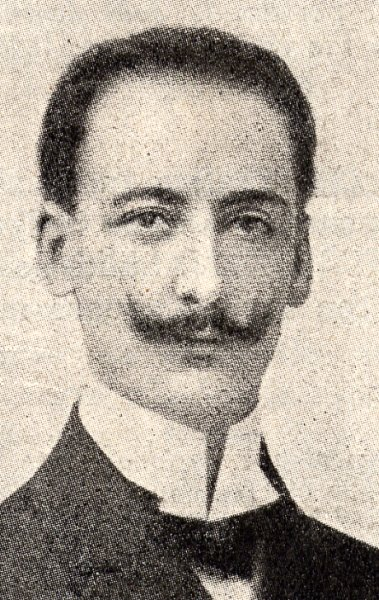

Minister of Agriculture
- In office July 1921 – February 1922
- Prime Minister: Ivanoe Bonomi

Personal details
- Born: 21 December 1873 Milan, Kingdom of Italy
- Died: 17 November 1936 (aged 62) Candia Lomellina, Kingdom of Italy
- Party: People's Party
- Children: 11
- Education: University of Genoa

Angelo Mauri (1873–1936) was an Italian journalist, economist, academic and anti-Fascist politician. He briefly served as the minister of agriculture between 1921 and 1922. Due to his anti-Fascist views and activities, he resigned from his teaching post in 1933.

== Early life and education ==
Mauri was born in Milan on 21 December 1873. His father was a school director, and his mother, Maria Tentorio, was from Como region. He obtained a degree in law from the University of Genoa. He also received a degree in philosophy in 1896. He was part of the Catholic movement and worked for Catholic publications during his university studies.

== Career and activities ==
Mauri started his career as a journalist and established a magazine Italia nuova in 1900. He served as president of the Italian Catholic University Federation from 1900 to 1904. He was elected to the provincial council in Milan in 1902. Mauri took part in the establishment of another Milan-based magazine entitled La Rassegna sociale of which other founders were Umberto Benigni and Filippo Meda. Mauri moved to Turin in October 1903 to run a Catholic newspaper Il Momento which he held until 1906. He was elected to the Parliament in 1904 becoming one of the first Catholic deputies. He was close to Archbishop Giacomo Della Chiesa, future Pope Benedict XV. Mauri was one of the founders the People's Party in 1919 and elected as a deputy the same year. After the election he served as the deputy president of the Parliament.

Mauri was appointed minister of agriculture in the cabinet led by Prime Minister Ivanoe Bonomi in July 1921. The cabinet resigned in February 1922, and his tenure ended. He and other two anti-Fascist members of the Parliament were removed from office in October 1926. He worked as a professor of economics at different higher education institutions until his resignation in 1933 when the Fascist government required all university lecturers to join the National Fascist Party.

Mauri was the author of several books on land reclamation and agronomics.

== Personal life and death ==
Mauri married Lisa Meda on 12 December 1900. They had a son, and his wife died in 1903. He married Maria Cappa Legora in Turin on 14 November 1904, and they had ten children.

Mauri died in Candia Lomellina on 17 November 1936.
