= Minister of Agriculture (Italy) =

Ministry in the Cabinet of Italy

Minister of Agriculture, Food Sovereignty and Forests
- Ministro dell'Agricoltura, della Sovranità Alimentare e delle Foreste

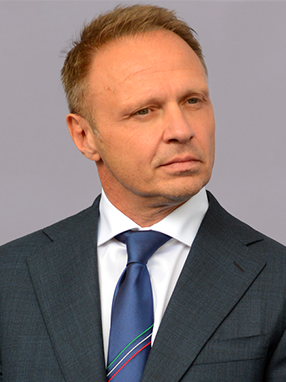
- Incumbent; Francesco Lollobrigida since 22 October 2022
- Ministry of Agriculture and Food Sovereignty
- Member of: Council of Ministers
- Reports to: The prime minister
- Seat: Rome
- Appointer: The president
- Term length: No fixed term
- Formation: 18 June 1916; 110 years ago
- First holder: Giovanni Ranieri
- Website: www.politicheagricole.it

The minister of agriculture, food sovereignty and forests is the head of the Republic of Italy's Ministry of Agriculture, Food Sovereignty and Forests. The ministry had been abolished by legislative referendum in 1993, during a period of great upheaval and financial sacrifices, but it was reconstituted in the same year until it assumed the current name in 2006.

The current minister of the is Francesco Lollobrigida, of the Brothers of Italy party, who he is serving since 22 October 2022, in the government of Giorgia Meloni.

== List of ministers of agriculture ==
=== Kingdom of Italy ===
Parties:

- 1916–1923:
  - Liberal Union
  - Democratic Liberal Party
  - Italian People's Party
  - Italian Liberal Party
- 1929–1943:
  - National Fascist Party
- 1943–1946:
  - Italian Communist Party
  - Independent

Coalitions:

- 1916–1922:
  - Liberal coalition
- 1922–1943:
  - Fascist
- 1943–1946:
  - National Liberation Committee
  - Mixed coalition

| Portrait | Name (Born–Died) | Term of office | | | Party | Government | Ref. |
| Portrait | Name (Born–Died) | Took office | Left office | Time in office | Party | Government | Ref. |
Minister of Agriculture
| | Giovanni Ranieri (1858–1944) | 18 June 1916 | 30 October 1917 | 1 year, 134 days | Liberal Union | Boselli | |
| | Giambattista Miliani (1856–1937) | 30 October 1917 | 17 January 1919 | 1 year, 79 days | Liberal Union | Orlando | |
| | Vincenzo Riccio (1858–1928) | 17 January 1919 | 23 June 1919 | 157 days | Liberal Union | Orlando | |
| | Achille Visocchi (1863–1945) | 23 June 1919 | 14 March 1920 | 265 days | Democratic Liberal Party | Nitti I | |
| | Alfredo Falcioni (1868–1936) | 14 March 1920 | 21 May 1920 | 78 days | Democratic Liberal Party | Nitti I | |
| | Giuseppe Micheli (1874–1948) | 21 May 1920 | 4 July 1921 | 1 year, 44 days | Italian People's Party | Nitti I Giolitti V | |
| | Angelo Mauri (1873–1936) | 4 July 1921 | 26 February 1922 | 237 days | Italian People's Party | Bonomi I | |
| | Giovanni Bertini (1878–1949) | 26 February 1922 | 31 October 1922 | 247 days | Italian People's Party | Facta I·II | |
| | Giuseppe De Capitani D'Arzago (1870–1945) | 31 October 1922 | 5 July 1923 | 247 days | Italian Liberal Party | Mussolini | |
| Office not in use | | 1923–1929 | | | | Mussolini | |
Minister of Agriculture and Forests
| | Giacomo Acerbo (1888–1969) | 12 September 1929 | 24 January 1935 | 5 years, 134 days | National Fascist Party | Mussolini | |
| | Edmondo Rossoni (1888–1969) | 24 January 1935 | 31 October 1939 | 4 years, 280 days | National Fascist Party | Mussolini | |
| | Giuseppe Tassinari (1891–1944) | 31 October 1939 | 26 December 1941 | 2 years, 56 days | National Fascist Party | Mussolini | |
| | Carlo Pareschi (1898–1944) | 26 December 1941 | 25 July 1943 | 1 year, 211 days | National Fascist Party | Mussolini | |
| | Alessandro Brizi (1878–1955) | 25 July 1943 | 11 February 1944 | 201 days | Independent | Badoglio I | |
| | Falcone Lucifero (1898–1997) | 11 February 1944 | 24 April 1944 | 73 days | Independent | Badoglio I | |
| | Fausto Gullo (1887–1974) | 24 April 1944 | 13 July 1946 | 2 years, 76 days | Italian Communist Party | Badoglio II; Bonomi II·III; Parri; De Gasperi I | |

=== Italian Republic ===
Parties:

- 1946–1994:
  - Christian Democracy
- 1994–present:
  - National Alliance
  - Italian People's Party
  - The Democrats
  - Federation of the Greens
  - Democratic Party
  - Northern League / League
  - The People of Freedom
  - The Populars of Italy Tomorrow
  - Italia Viva
  - Five Star Movement
  - Brothers of Italy
  - Independent

Coalitions:

- 1946–1994:
  - National Liberation Committee
  - Centrist coalition
  - Organic Centre-left
  - Pentapartito / Quadripartito
  - Mixed coalition
- 1994–present:
  - Centre-right coalition
  - Centre-left coalition
  - Mixed coalition

| Portrait | Name (Born–Died) | Term of office | | | Party | Government | Ref. |
| Portrait | Name (Born–Died) | Took office | Left office | Time in office | Party | Government | Ref. |
Minister of Agriculture and Forests
| | Antonio Segni (1891–1972) | 13 July 1946 | 26 July 1951 | 5 years, 13 days | Christian Democracy | De Gasperi II·III | |
| | Antonio Segni (1891–1972) | 13 July 1946 | 26 July 1951 | 5 years, 13 days | Christian Democracy | De Gasperi IV·V·VI | |
| | Amintore Fanfani (1908–1999) | 26 July 1951 | 16 July 1953 | 1 year, 355 days | Christian Democracy | De Gasperi IV | |
| | Rocco Salomone (1883–1960) | 16 July 1953 | 18 January 1954 | 186 days | Christian Democracy | De Gasperi IV; Pella | |
| | Giuseppe Medici (1907–2000) | 18 January 1954 | 6 July 1955 | 1 year, 169 days | Christian Democracy | Fanfani I Scelba | |
| | Emilio Colombo (1920–2013) | 6 July 1955 | 1 July 1958 | 2 years, 360 days | Christian Democracy | Segni I Zoli | |
| | Mario Ferrari Aggradi (1916–1997) | 1 July 1958 | 16 February 1959 | 230 days | Christian Democracy | Fanfani II | |
| | Mariano Rumor (1915–1990) | 16 February 1959 | 21 June 1963 | 4 years, 125 days | Christian Democracy | Segni II; Tambroni; Fanfani III·IV | |
| | Bernardo Mattarella (1905–1971) | 21 June 1963 | 4 December 1963 | 166 days | Christian Democracy | Leone I | |
| | Mario Ferrari Aggradi (1916–1997) | 4 December 1963 | 23 February 1966 | 2 years, 81 days | Christian Democracy | Moro I·II | |
| | Franco Restivo (1911–1976) | 23 February 1966 | 24 June 1968 | 2 years, 122 days | Christian Democracy | Moro III | |
| | Giacomo Sedati (1921–1984) | 24 June 1968 | 12 December 1968 | 171 days | Christian Democracy | Leone II | |
| | Athos Valsecchi (1919–1985) | 12 December 1968 | 5 August 1969 | 236 days | Christian Democracy | Rumor I | |
| | Giacomo Sedati (1921–1984) | 5 August 1969 | 27 March 1970 | 234 days | Christian Democracy | Rumor II | |
| | Lorenzo Natali (1922–1989) | 27 March 1970 | 7 July 1973 | 3 years, 102 days | Christian Democracy | Rumor III; Colombo | |
| | Lorenzo Natali (1922–1989) | 27 March 1970 | 7 July 1973 | 3 years, 102 days | Christian Democracy | Andreotti I·II | |
| | Mario Ferrari Aggradi (1916–1997) | 7 July 1973 | 14 March 1974 | 250 days | Christian Democracy | Rumor IV | |
| | Antonio Bisaglia (1920–1984) | 14 March 1974 | 23 November 1974 | 254 days | Christian Democracy | Rumor V | |
| | Giovanni Marcora (1922–1983) | 23 November 1974 | 18 October 1980 | 5 years, 330 days | Christian Democracy | Moro IV·V; Andreotti III·IV·V; Cossiga I | |
| | Giovanni Marcora (1922–1983) | 23 November 1974 | 18 October 1980 | 5 years, 330 days | Christian Democracy | Cossiga II | |
| | Giuseppe Bartolomei (1923–1996) | 18 October 1980 | 1 December 1982 | 2 years, 44 days | Christian Democracy | Forlani | |
| | Giuseppe Bartolomei (1923–1996) | 18 October 1980 | 1 December 1982 | 2 years, 44 days | Christian Democracy | Spadolini I·II | |
| | Calogero Mannino (1939– ) | 1 December 1982 | 4 August 1983 | 246 days | Christian Democracy | Fanfani V | |
| | Filippo Maria Pandolfi (1927–2025) | 4 August 1983 | 13 April 1988 | 4 years, 253 days | Christian Democracy | Craxi I·II | |
| | Filippo Maria Pandolfi (1927–2025) | 4 August 1983 | 13 April 1988 | 4 years, 253 days | Christian Democracy | Fanfani VI | |
| | Filippo Maria Pandolfi (1927–2025) | 4 August 1983 | 13 April 1988 | 4 years, 253 days | Christian Democracy | Goria | |
| | Calogero Mannino (1939– ) | 13 April 1988 | 27 July 1990 | 2 years, 105 days | Christian Democracy | De Mita; Andreotti VI | |
| | Vito Saccomandi (1939–1995) | 27 July 1990 | 12 April 1991 | 259 days | Christian Democracy | Andreotti VI | |
| | Giovanni Goria (1943–1994) | 12 April 1991 | 28 June 1992 | 1 year, 77 days | Christian Democracy | Andreotti VII | |
| | Giovanni Angelo Fontana (1944– ) | 28 June 1992 | 21 March 1993 | 266 days | Christian Democracy | Amato I | |
| | Alfredo Diana (1930–2025) | 21 March 1993 | 10 May 1994 | 1 year, 50 days | Christian Democracy / Italian People's Party | Amato I | |
| | Alfredo Diana (1930–2025) | 21 March 1993 | 10 May 1994 | 1 year, 50 days | Christian Democracy / Italian People's Party | Ciampi | |
Minister of Agriculture, Food and Forests
| | Adriana Poli Bortone (1943– ) | 10 May 1994 | 17 January 1995 | 252 days | National Alliance | Berlusconi I | |
| | Walter Luchetti (1937– ) | 17 January 1995 | 17 May 1996 | 1 year, 121 days | Independent | Dini | |
| | Michele Pinto (1931–2026) | 17 May 1996 | 21 October 1998 | 2 years, 157 days | Italian People's Party | Prodi I | |
Minister of Agricultural Policies
| | Paolo De Castro (1958– ) | 21 October 1998 | 25 April 2000 | 1 year, 187 days | Independent / The Democrats | D'Alema I·II | |
Minister of Agricultural and Forestry Policies
| | Alfonso Pecoraro Scanio (1959– ) | 25 April 2000 | 11 June 2001 | 1 year, 47 days | Federation of the Greens | Amato II | |
| | Gianni Alemanno (1958– ) | 11 June 2001 | 17 May 2006 | 4 years, 340 days | National Alliance | Berlusconi II·III | |
Minister of Agricultural, Food and Forestry Policies
| | Paolo De Castro (1958– ) | 17 May 2006 | 8 May 2008 | 1 year, 357 days | The Daisy / Democratic Party | Prodi II | |
| | Luca Zaia (1968– ) | 8 May 2008 | 16 April 2010 | 1 year, 343 days | Northern League | Berlusconi IV | |
| | Giancarlo Galan (1956– ) | 16 April 2010 | 23 March 2011 | 341 days | The People of Freedom | Berlusconi IV | |
| | Francesco Saverio Romano (1964– ) | 23 March 2011 | 16 November 2011 | 238 days | The Populars of Italy Tomorrow | Berlusconi IV | |
| | Mario Catania (1952– ) | 16 November 2011 | 28 April 2013 | 1 year, 163 days | Independent | Monti | |
| | Nunzia De Girolamo (1975– ) | 28 April 2013 | 27 January 2014 | 274 days | The People of Freedom / New Centre-Right | Letta | |
| | Enrico Letta (1966– ) As Prime Minister | 27 January 2014 | 22 February 2014 | 26 days | Democratic Party | Letta | |
| | Maurizio Martina (1978– ) | 22 February 2014 | 13 March 2018 | 4 years, 19 days | Democratic Party | Renzi; Gentiloni | |
| | Paolo Gentiloni (1954– ) As Prime Minister | 13 March 2018 | 1 June 2018 | 80 days | Democratic Party | Gentiloni | |
Minister of Agricultural, Food and Forestry Policies and Tourism
| | Gian Marco Centinaio (1971– ) | 1 June 2018 | 5 September 2019 | 1 year, 96 days | League | Conte I | |
Minister of Agricultural, Food and Forestry Policies
| | Teresa Bellanova (1958– ) | 5 September 2019 | 14 January 2021 | 1 year, 131 days | Democratic Party / Italia Viva | Conte II | |
| | Giuseppe Conte (1964– ) As Prime Minister | 14 January 2021 | 13 February 2021 | 30 days | Independent | Conte II | |
| | Stefano Patuanelli (1974– ) | 13 February 2021 | 22 October 2022 | 1 year, 251 days | Five Star Movement | Draghi | |
Minister of Agriculture, Food Sovereignty and Forests
| | Francesco Lollobrigida (1972– ) | 22 October 2022 | Incumbent | 3 years, 320 days | Brothers of Italy | Meloni | |
