= Leonida Bissolati =

Italian politician (1857–1920)

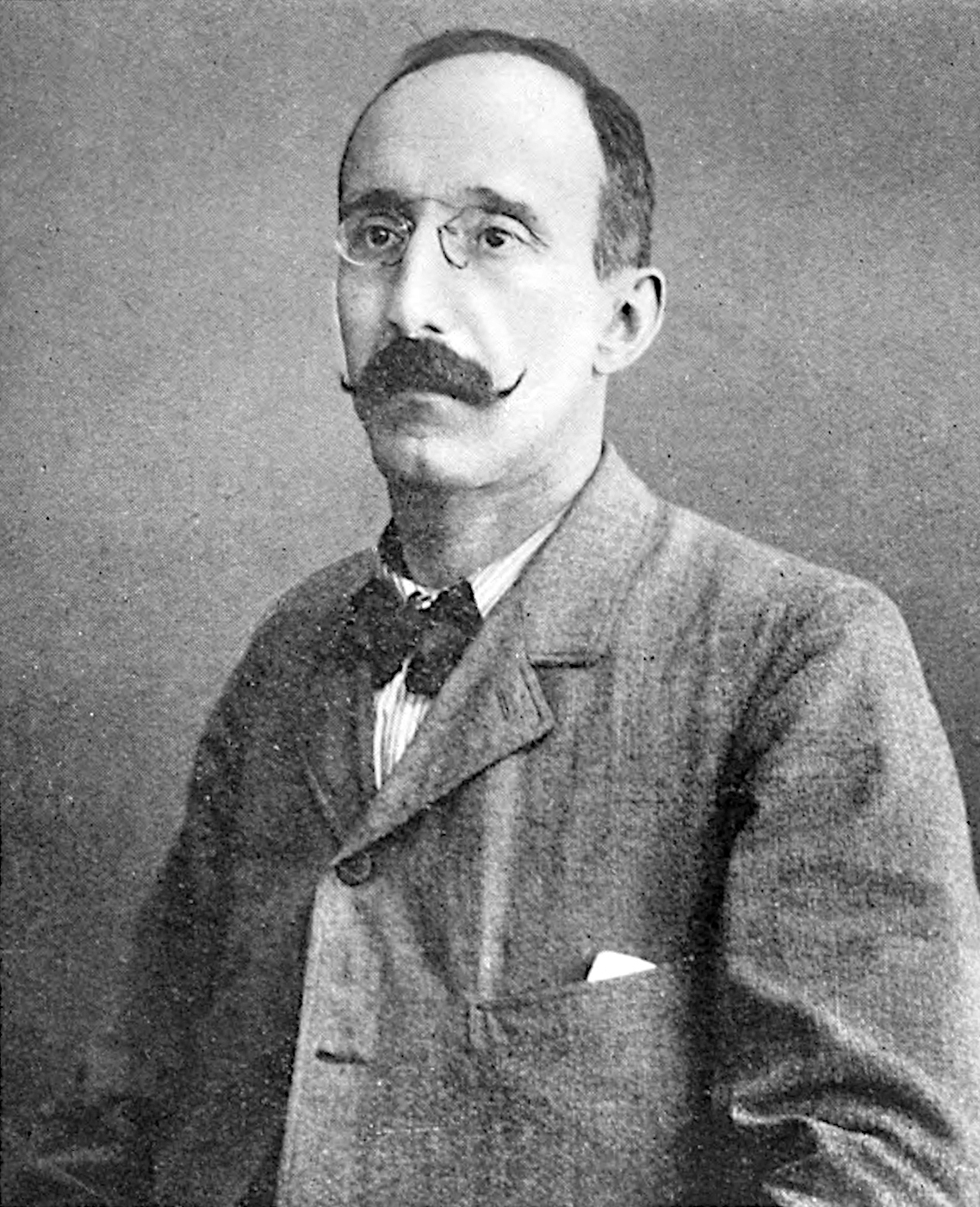
- Bissolati in 1912

Member of the Chamber of Deputies
- In office 10 June 1895 – 6 May 1920
- Constituency: Pescarolo ed Uniti

Personal details
- Born: Leonida Bergamaschi; 20 February 1857 Cremona, Kingdom of Sardinia
- Died: 6 May 1920 (aged 63) Rome, Kingdom of Italy
- Cause of death: Post-operative infection
- Party: PRI (1876–1880); PSI (1880–1912); PSRI (1912–1920)
- Spouses: Ginevra Coggi; Carolina Cassola
- Education: University of Bologna
- Occupation: Lawyer; publicist; journalist

Leonida Bissolati (né Bergamaschi; 20 February 1857 – 6 May 1920) was a leading exponent of the Italian socialist movement at the turn of the 19th century.

== Early life and education ==
Bissolati was born in Cremona from the liaison of Paolina Bergamaschi, a nurse, with Stefano Bissolati, a priest who left the church in 1859 at age 37, and later became director of Cremona's city library and a noted scholar. At birth, the child was named Leonida Bergamaschi; his name was changed at age 18, when Stefano Bissolati legally adopted him (after marrying Paolina in 1868, five years after she had become a widow). With this family background, it is scarcely surprising that Leonida turned to left-wing politics as a student at the University of Bologna, where he earned his law degree at the age of 20. Returning to Cremona, he practised law as an attorney and published many articles in journals and newspapers.

== Career ==
In 1876, Bissolati was elected to the City Council of Cremona, at first in the ranks of the Italian Radical Party, then gradually moving closer to the Italian Socialist Party (PSI). He served in the council for 18 years, notably by being in charge of Public Education. He married Ginevra Coggi, who soon fell chronically ill and died in 1894; later, his soulmate and companion was Carolina Cassola, whom he eventually married in 1913.

From 1889 to 1895, Bissolati organized peasant demonstrations and the social struggle for better living conditions in the countryside. In 1889, he founded L'eco del popolo (The Echo of the People), which subsequently became the local organ in Cremona of the PSI. He also published a partial translation of the Communist Manifesto of Karl Marx and Friedrich Engels. In 1896, he became director of Avanti! (Forward!), the official organ of the PSI, relinquishing this post in 1903, only to resume it from 1908 to 1910. Meanwhile, Bissolati was active as a legislator. In 1897, he was elected to the Chamber of Deputies of the Parliament of the Kingdom of Italy, representing the constituency of Pescarolo ed Uniti. His refusal to oppose the Italo-Turkish War for the conquest of Libya triggered his resignation as member of Parliament in February 1912; five months later, he was expelled from the PSI. He promptly went on to found the Italian Reformist Socialist Party (PSRI), with Ivanoe Bonomi (a future prime minister of Italy) and Angiolo Cabrini.

Bissolati strongly advocated Italy's entry into World War I on the side of the Triple Entente, while his former socialist friends favoured neutrality. He volunteered for the front and served with distinction, receiving a medal. Back in Rome, he served in two successive Italian governments (those Liberal Union-led headed by Paolo Boselli and Vittorio Emanuele Orlando). He was responsible for supplying troops as well as for liaising between cabinet and the generals. At the end of the war, Bissolati supported the League of Nations and Woodrow Wilson's principle of self-determination in the settling of the new national borders. This infuriated the Italian nationalists and irredentists, bent on annexing to Italy sizeable areas inhabited by Germans and Slavs in the Northeast. Attacked from all sides, he resigned from the government and withdrew from politics in December 1918, although subsequently he met with Wilson and urged that Italy not be given Fiume or the Dalmatian Coast.

== Death and legacy ==
Bissolati died in Rome of a post-operative infection. On 18 December 1974, the Leonida Bissolati Lodge, a Masonic centre affiliated with the Grand Orient of Italy and named in his honour, was founded in Cremona. In August 2018, the regular Scottish Rite Masonic Lodge of Cremona commemorated Bissolati as one of his notable members.

== Bibliography ==
- Alfassio Grimaldi, Ugoberto; Bozzetti, Gherardo (1983). Bissolati (in Italian). Milan: Rizzoli Press.
- Chisholm, Hugh, ed. (1922). "Bissolati-Bergamaschi, Leonida" . Encyclopædia Britannica (12th ed.). London & New York: The Encyclopædia Britannica Company.
