= Salvatore Barzilai =

Italian journalist and politician (1860–1939)

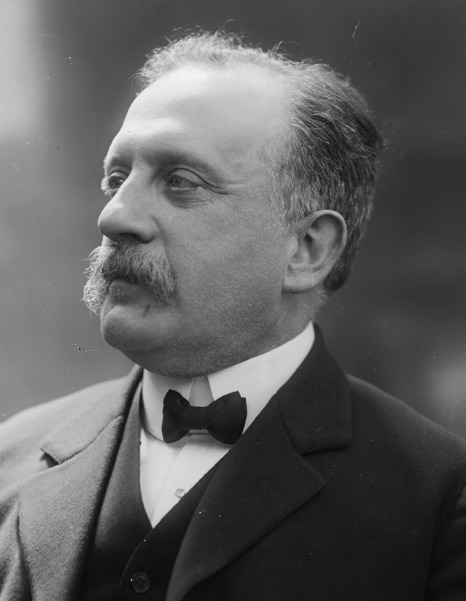

Minister for the Lands Freed by the Enemy
- In office 16 July 1915 – 18 July 1916
- Prime Minister: Antonio Salandra
- Preceded by: Office established
- Succeeded by: Office abolished

Personal details
- Born: 5 July 1860 Trieste
- Died: May 1939 (aged 78–79) Rome
- Party: Republican Party (1897–1912)
- Spouse: Maria Roncetti
- Children: 3
- Education: University of Bologna

Salvatore Barzilai (5 July 1860 – May 1939) was an Italian jurist, journalist and politician who was one of the leaders of the Republican Party. He served as the minister for the lands freed by the enemy for one year between 1915 and 1916.

== Early life and education ==
Barzilai was born in Trieste on 5 July 1860 into a Jewish family. His parents were Giuseppe and Elena Saraval. His father was a lawyer and a Hebrew scholar and archaeologist.

Barzilai obtained a degree in law from the University of Bologna. During his studies he was arrested and tried in 1878. He was sentenced to prison due to the alleged treason against Austria and was acquitted by the court of appeal of Graz after one-year detention in prison.

== Career ==
Barzilai worked as a journalist before his political career. He worked for L'eco del Popolo in Bologna, L'indipendente in Trieste and La Tribuna in Rome.

Barzilai was elected as a deputy in the general elections on 23 November 1890. His term at the Chamber of Deputies lasted until 1919, and he served for eight successive terms. He was one of the founders of the Republican Party in 1897. He also served as the president of the party, but resigned from the office following the Congress in Ancona held in 20–22 May 1912.

On 16 July 1915 Barzilai was appointed minister for the lands freed by the enemy to the cabinet led by Prime Minister Antonio Salandra and was in office until 18 July 1916. Barzilai was part of the Italian delegation to the Paris Peace Conference held in 1919. In September 1920 he was elected to the Italian Senate.

Barzilai served as the president of the Rome Press Association for two terms (September 1905 – 1915 and 1920–1923) as the president of National Press Federation again for two terms (1908–1913 and 1920–1924). The latter was the main body which represented the Italian journalists. In his first term as its president Barzilai encouraged the Chamber of Deputies to take some steps to restrict the Italian press with the goal of economic and nationalistic defense of the Kingdom. As a result, some measures were taken by the Chamber and then approved by the Senate which would be the basis for the law numbered 273 and dated 21 March 1915.

=== Activities and views ===
Barzilai supported irredentist views in early ages. He was a freemason. He was one of the leading figures of Triestine Club in Rome which acted as a connection between the Triestine Masonry and the Roman Masonic lodge.

== Personal life and death ==
Barzilai was married to Maria Roncetti with whom he had three children: two daughters and a son. He died in Rome in May 1939.
