= Lodovico Mortara =

Italian jurist, magistrate, and politician (1855–1937)

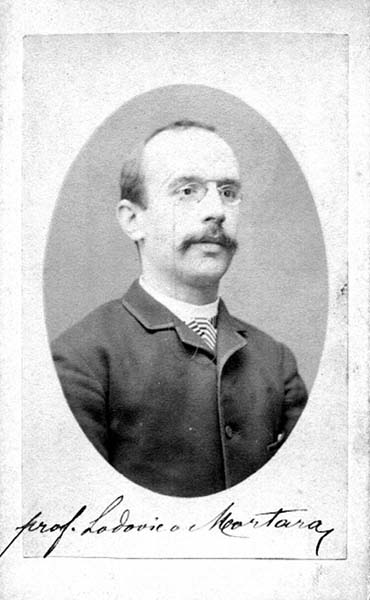

Minister of Justice
- In office 23 June 1919 – 21 May 1920
- Preceded by: Luigi Facta
- Succeeded by: Alfredo Falcioni

Member of the Senate of the Kingdom of Italy
- In office 16 January 1910 – 1 January 1937

Personal details
- Born: 16 April 1855 Mantua, Kingdom of Italy
- Died: 1 January 1937 (aged 81) Rome, Kingdom of Italy
- Spouse: Clelia Vivanti (1883–1937)
- Children: 2
- Occupation: Jurist, magistrate, politician

Lodovico Mortara (16 April 1855 – 1 January 1937) was an Italian jurist, magistrate, and politician. He served as Minister of Justice with the first Nitti government.

== Early life and academic career ==
Born in Mantua into a Jewish family as an Austrian citizen, Mortara was the son of Marco Mortara (Mordechai), the senior rabbi of the community, and his wife Sara Castelfranco. After graduating in law from the University of Modena in 1874, he practised as a lawyer before embarking on an academic career. Beginning as a freelance lecturer in civil procedure in Bologna in 1882, he obtained the position of extraordinary professor in the Faculty of Law of the University of Pisa in 1886 soon after he published, at the age of thirty, a pamphlet on the politics of law: The Modern State and Justice. He became a full professor there in 1888.

His academic positions prompted him to write a number of teaching works, which went through several editions. These included the two volumes of his Manual of Civil Procedure (1887–1888) and both the Principles of Civil Procedure and the Institutions of the Judicial System (1890). In 1892, together with Carlo Francesco Gabba, he took over the direction of the magazine Giurisprudenza italiana, which he continued for forty-five years. In 1898, he moved to the Faculty of Law of Naples to take up the chair of civil procedure; in the same year he began publishing, in instalments, his commentary on the code and on the laws of civil procedure. Completed in 1909, the work extended to five volumes and was republished several times.

== Judicial career ==
In 1902, at the peak of his academic career, Mortara decided to leave academia to become a magistrate. He was general prosecutor in the Court of Appeal of Cagliari in 1905, first president in the Court of Appeal of Ancona in 1906, general prosecutor of the Court of Cassation of Palermo in 1909. and then of the Court of Cassation of Florence and that of Rome in 1911.

Finally, he became First President of the Court of Cassation of Rome, a position he held until 1923, when the new fascist regime forced him into early retirement on the pretext of creating a single Supreme Court. In any event, as proof of Mussolini’s hostility, “only a note written by the Prime Minister himself to minister Oviglio was discovered. The directive—for such it was—carries no date, but the date ‘5 June 1923’ is penciled on it, and it states: ‘For Oviglio. Mortara cannot be President of the Unified Court of Cassation.’ Needless to say, the order was carried out.”.

As a magistrate, Mortara dealt with all sorts of controversies; for example, during his presidency of the Court of Appeal of Ancona in 1906, he upheld the right of ten women teachers from Senigallia to be registered on the electoral lists. He thought a lot about the right of women to be included in the political fabric, despite the prejudices of the time. Later on in a 1922 judgement, he affirmed the unconstitutionality of a decree of the Mussolini government.

== Political career ==
In 1910, Mortara was appointed to the Senate of the Kingdom of Italy, and in 1919–1920 served as minister of justice with the first Nitti government. His parliamentary activity as a member of various ministerial commissions saw his involvement in various reforms, including:

- the Code of Criminal Procedure of 1913, the Finocchiaro Aprile code, still in force today in the Vatican City. This included an institution he had already looked forward to in The Modern State and Justice, namely the criminal sentencing decree;
- the 1919 repeal of marital authorization, whereby women had to ask the head of the family for authorization to appear in court and to dispose of assets (such as donating, mortgaging, or selling real estate);
- the Mortara Law, promulgated in 1919 to strengthen the ranks of the judiciary, whose members had been decimated by the First World War. It opened access to the judiciary to all law graduates who had been on the professional register for at least five years and/or had been practicing the profession of notary for the same time; and
- the law of 1922, which introduced the injunction into the Italian legal system.

A Freemason, Mortara was a member of the Grand Orient of Italy. In 1920, he became a member of its Supreme Council of the Scottish Rite.

== Family life and legacy ==
In 1883, Mortara married Clelia Vivanti, who was his companion for 28 years. They had two sons and three daughters: the eldest son, Giorgio Mortara, became an internationally renowned statistician and economist while one of his daughters, it:Nella Mortara, was a teacher of experimental physics.

Mortara died in Rome on 31 December 1936. He wanted to be buried in the Jewish cemetery of Mantua, next to his parents and wife, and did not want to be commemorated by the Senate of the Italian fascist regime. No studies in his honour or in his memory were undertaken and his work seemed destined for oblivion until over 30 years after his death in 1968, when Salvatore Satta brought his work to wider attention. In 1997, the Accademia Nazionale dei Lincei dedicated a Lincea day to him.

== Major works ==
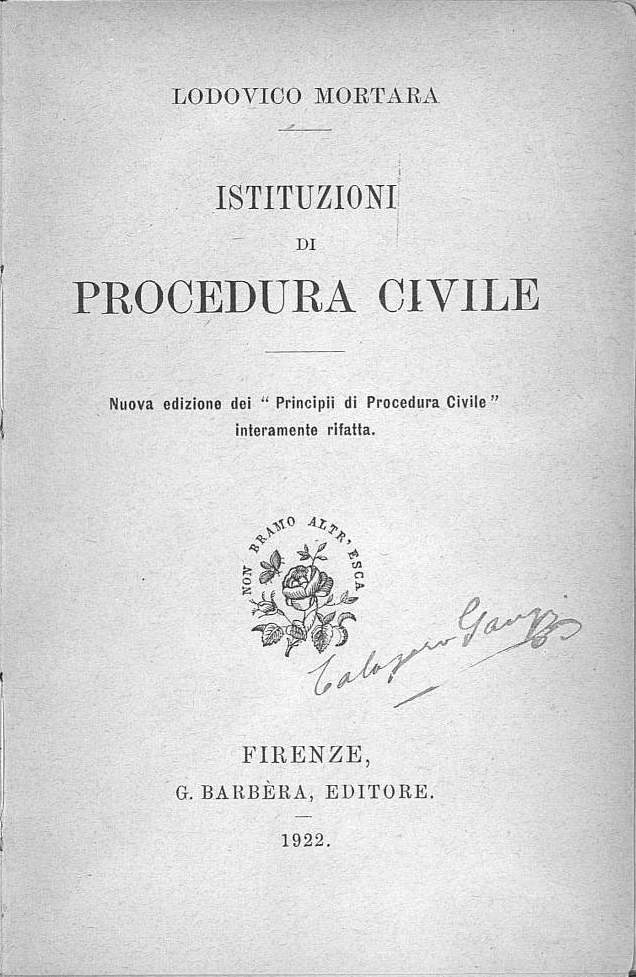
Istituzioni di procedura civile, 1922

- Lo Stato moderno e la giustizia (The Modern State and Justice). Turin: Unione Tipografico-Editrice. 1885.
- Istituzioni di ordinamento giudiziario (Judicial Institutions). Firenze: Barbera. 1906.
- Istituzioni di procedura civile (Institutions of Civil Procedure). Firenze: Barbera. 1922. (new edition of Principii di procedura civile)

== Honours ==
Cavaliere di Gran Croce decorato di Gran Cordone dell'Ordine della Corona d'Italia - ribbon for ordinary uniform

Grand Cordon of the Order of the Crown of Italy.

Cavaliere di Gran Croce decorato di Gran Cordone dell'Ordine dei Santi Maurizio e Lazzaro - ribbon for ordinary uniform

Grand Cordon of the Order of Saints Maurice and Lazarus.

Cavaliere dell'Ordine Civile di Savoia - ribbon for ordinary uniform

Kinight of the Civil Order of Savoy.

Full list

- Knight of the Order of the Crown of Italy, 25 March 1894.
- Officer of the Order of the Crown of Italy, 23 January 1896.
- Commander of the Order of the Crown of Italy, 18 December 1902.
- Grand Officer of the Order of the Crown of Italy, 29 December 1907.
- Grand Cordon of the Order of the Crown of Italy, 14 November 1910.
- Knight of the Order of Order of Saints Maurice and Lazarus, 20 March 1898.
- Officer of the Order of Order of Saints Maurice and Lazarus, 20 January 1907.
- Grand Officer of the Order of Saints Maurice and Lazarus, 13 June 1909.
- Grand Cordon of the Order of Saints Maurice and Lazarus, 27 April 1913.
- Knight of the Civil Order of Savoy, 8 November 1916.
