= Giuseppe Micheli (politician) =

Italian notary and politician (1874–1948)

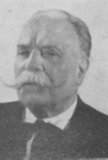

Minister of Agriculture
- In office May 1920 – 1921
- Prime Minister: Francesco Saverio Nitti; Giovanni Giolitti

Minister of Public Works
- In office 1921–1922
- Prime Minister: Ivanoe Bonomi

Minister of the Navy
- In office 1946–1947
- Prime Minister: Alcide De Gasperi

Personal details
- Born: 19 October 1874 Parma
- Died: 17 October 1948 (aged 73) Rome
- Party: Christian Democracy
- Spouse: Lucia Basetti

Giuseppe Micheli (1874–1948) was an Italian notary and politician who was a member of the Christian Democracy party. He served in different ministerial posts in the 1920s and 1940s.

== Biography ==
Micheli was born in Parma on 19 October 1874. He was a notary by profession. In 1902 he joined the first movement of Christian Democracy. He became a member of the Chamber of Deputies in 1908. He was the minister of agriculture in the cabinet of Prime Minister Francesco Saverio Nitti between May and June 1920 and in the next cabinet led by Giovanni Giolitti from 1920 to 1921. Next Micheli was the minister of public works in the cabinet of Ivanoe Bonomi between 1921 and 1922.

Micheli was the minister of the navy in the cabinet of Alcide De Gasperi in the period between 1946 and 1947. He served in the Senate of the Republic in 1948. He was also vice president of the Chamber of Deputies, chaired by Vittorio Emanuele Orlando.

Micheli married Lucia Basetti, a daughter of the deputy Gian Lorenzo Basetti, in 1903. He died in Rome on 17 October 1948. One of their children was Michele Micheli, who was also a notary and jurist.
