= Giovanni Sechi =

Italian admiral and politician

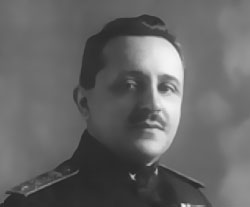

Senator
- In office 31 July 1919 – 5 August 1943

Minister of the Navy
- In office 23 June 1919 – 4 July 1921

Giovanni Sechi (Sassari, 1861 - Rome, 1948) was an Italian admiral and politician.

== Naval career ==
Sechi graduated from the Italian Naval Academy in 1883. Between 1903 and 1906, as a lieutenant and professor at the Naval Academy, Sechi published a two-volume work entitled Elementi di Arte Militari Marittima, a thesis on naval strategy and doctrine. It outlined the importance of strategy, in contrast to the established Italian emphasis on naval battle tactics. He also made an ultimately successful case for Italy to invest in fast dreadnoughts.

He took part as an officer in the Italo-Turkish War and in the First World War. Made a rear admiral in 1918, he was promoted to reserve vice admiral in 1923 and then squadron admiral in 1926.

== Political career ==
Appointed a senator in 1919, he was interim Minister of War (23-24 June 1919). He served as Minister of the Navy in the first and second Nitti governments and the fifth Giolitti government (1920–21) during the difficult postwar period in which Italy was trying to return to a sustainable peacetime economy and scale back its military and naval costs.

As Navy Minister Sechi followed the Nitti government line of demobilisation and reduction in arms manufacture. The navy was reduced in strength from 120,000 to 34,000 men; four old battleships and fifteen cruisers were decommissioned and the construction of the dreadnought Francesco Caracciolo halted. At the same time as retiring Italy’s expensive larger warships, Sechi commissioned eight new minelayers, four destroyers, four submarines and eight torpedo boats.

He also made an unsuccessful proposal to end direct state management of shipyards and leave them to the private sector.

Sechi also took a conservative line on the Adriatic question after the First World War. Paolo Thaon di Revel and Alfredo Acton believed Italy’s security required that she deny control of the Adriatic ports to any potentially hostile power; hence that Italy should occupy Dalmatia as had been agreed in the Treaty of London. As the new Kingdom of Yugoslavia possessed a navy of only twelve small ships, Sechi did not believe it was a threat.

He also served as president of the Italian Naval and Aeronautical Register from 1928 to 1935.

== Honours ==
Commander of the Military Order of Savoy - ribbon for ordinary uniform

Commander of the Military Order of Savoy
— 15 November 1918

Grand Cordon of the Order of the Crown of Italy - ribbon for ordinary uniform

Grand Cordon of the Order of the Crown of Italy
— 2 January 1920

Grand Cordon of the Order of Saints Maurice and Lazarus - ribbon for ordinary uniform

Grand Cordon of the Order of Saints Maurice and Lazarus
— 5 July 1935

War Merit Cross - ribbon for ordinary uniform

War Merit Cross
