= Marco Mortara =

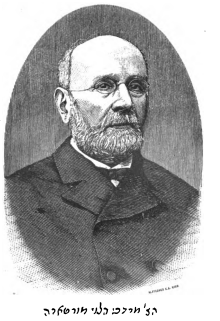

Marco Mortara (born at Viadana, 7 May 1815; died at Mantua, 2 February 1894) was an Italian rabbi and scholar.

Having graduated from the rabbinical college of Padua in 1836, he was called as rabbi to Mantua in 1842, and occupied this position until his death. He was very conservative in his religious views and opposed the abolition of the second day of the holy days which had been planned by some of the liberal members of his congregation (Eleazar Horowitz, Responsa, No. 131, Vienna, 1870).

As a true disciple of Samuel David Luzzatto he was a strong opponent of Cabala, which involved him in a heated controversy with Elijah Benamozegh. In his will he wrote his epitaph, containing merely biographical data, and expressed the wish that no sermon should be preached at his funeral and no eulogy published in the papers.

Besides many sermons and articles, published in German, Hebrew, French, and Italian periodicals, he wrote textbooks for religious instruction, essays on religious questions of the day, apologetic essays, and bibliographical works, among which is of special importance a list of all names pertaining to Jewish history in Italy under the title Mazkeret Ḥakme Italiya: Indice Alfabetico dei Rabbini e Scrittori Israeliti di Cose Giudaiche in Italia, Padua, 1887.

He is the father of Italian justice and senator Lodovico Mortara and grandfather of statistician Giorgio Mortara.
