= Pompeo Ciotti =

Italian freemason and political activist

Secretary of the Italian Socialist Party
- In office 13 February 1909 – 10 July 1912
- Preceded by: Enrico Ferri
- Succeeded by: Costantino Lazzari

Secretary of the Italian Reformist Socialist Party
- In office 10 July 1912 – 11 October 1915
- Preceded by: Established position
- Succeeded by: Mario Silvestri

Personal details
- Born: 24 February 1858 Pistoia
- Died: 11 October 1915 (aged 57) Florence
- Profession: Politician, activist, trade unionist, lawyer

Pompeo Ciotti (Pistoia, 1858–1915) was an Italian freemason and political activist.

In 1898 he was sentenced to four years and two months in prison for the crime of incitement to violent overthrow of the constitution.

He served as secretary of the Pavia Chamber of Labour and later of the Italian Socialist Party (PSI).

In 1912 he was elected secretary of the breakaway Italian Reformist Socialist Party, established after the expulsion from the PSI of those members who did not support its position opposing the Italian invasion of Libya.

== Works ==
Ciotti left a number published works:

- Agguati Della Consorteria, Maggio 1898. Cinque anni doppo (1903)
- Maggio Sanguiniso. Bozzetti di Firenze
- Sindicalismo Italico. Dalle Origini all’Insurrezzione (1906)
