= Paolino Taddei =

Italian politician

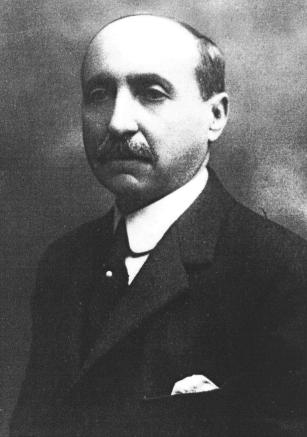
- Born: 22 January 1860; Poggio a Caiano, Italy
- Died: 15 October 1925 (aged 65); Florence, Italy
- Occupation: Politician

Paolino Taddei (22 January 1860 – 15 October 1925) was an Italian politician and the last minister of Interior before the March on Rome.

== Life ==
Born in Poggio a Caiano near Florence in 1911 he was named Prefetto of the Province of Ferrara where he worked as mediator in the contention between the local Trade Unions and the entrepreneurs, then he was named prefetto of Ancona and Turin. On 1921 he was named as Senator of the Kingdom by king Victor Emmanuel III.

In August 1922 he was named Minister of Interior of the government headed by Luigi Facta. In the night between 27 October and 28 October 1922 he joined the decision to declare the State of Siege against the fascists, but the king refused to sign the order and Taddei resigned from his post like the whole Cabinet. He died in Florence in 1925.

Political offices
Preceded by Luigi Facta	Italian Minister of the Interior; 1922	Succeeded by Benito Mussolini
