= Italian Reformist Socialist Party =

Political party, 1912–1925

Italian Reformist Socialist Party Partito Socialista Riformista Italiano
- Secretary: Pompeo Ciotti
- Leaders: Leonida Bissolati; Ivanoe Bonomi; Arturo Labriola; Alberto Beneduce
- Founded: June 10, 1912
- Banned: November 6, 1926
- Split from: Italian Socialist Party
- Succeeded by: Labour Democratic Party (not legal successor)
- Ideology: Social democracy
- Political position: Centre-left

The Italian Reformist Socialist Party (Italian: Partito Socialista Riformista Italiano, PSRI) was a social-democratic political party in Italy.

== History ==
It was formed in 1912 by those leading reformist socialists who had been expelled from the Italian Socialist Party because of their desire of entering in the majority supporting Prime Minister Giovanni Giolitti. Leading members of the PSRI were Leonida Bissolati, Ivanoe Bonomi, and Meuccio Ruini. In the 1913 Italian general election, the party won 2.6% of the vote and 21 seats in single-seat constituencies spread in almost all the Italian regions; some others, such as Ruini, were elected for the Italian Radical Party. In the 1919 Italian general election, they won 1.5% of the vote and gained 15 seats under the new proportional representation system.

The party was dissolved by the Italian fascist regime on 6 November 1926, together with all opposition parties. After World War II, Bonomi and Ruini launched the Labour Democratic Party as the continuation of the PSRI and positioned it within the National Democratic Union, which comprised the Italian Liberal Party and some former Radicals.

== Electoral results ==
=== Italian Parliament ===
Chamber of Deputies
Election	Votes	%	Seats	+/–	Leader	Government
1913	196,406 (6th)	3.9	19 / 508	–	Leonida Bissolati	Opposition (1914–1916)
1913	196,406 (6th)	3.9	19 / 508	–	Leonida Bissolati	Coalition (1916–1920)
1919	82,157 (9th)	1.4	6 / 508	▼13	Leonida Bissolati	Opposition (1920)
1919	82,157 (9th)	1.4	6 / 508	▼13	Leonida Bissolati	Coalition (1920–1922)
