= Liberals (Italy) =

Liberals Liberali
- Leader: Giovanni Giolitti
- Other leaders: Sidney Sonnino; Antonio Salandra; Vittorio Emanuele Orlando; Luigi Facta
- Founded: 1913
- Dissolved: 1922
- Merger of: Historical Left; Historical Right
- Succeeded by: Italian Liberal Party
- Ideology: Liberalism (Italian); Classical liberalism Conservative liberalism Monarchism
- Political position: Centre to centre-right

Election symbol

The Liberals (Italian: Liberali), also known as Liberal Party (Italian: Partito Liberale, PL) or Giolittian Liberals (Italian: Liberali Giolittiani) from the name of their leader, was a political alliance formed in the first years of the 20th century by the Italian Prime Minister and leader of the Historical Left Giovanni Giolitti. The alliance was formed when the Left and the Right merged in a single centrist and liberal coalition which largely dominated the Italian Parliament.

== History ==
The origins of liberalism in Italy are in the Historical Right, a parliamentary group formed by Camillo Benso, Count of Cavour in the Parliament of the Kingdom of Sardinia following the 1848 revolution. The group was moderately conservative and supported centralised government, restricted suffrage, regressive taxation and free trade. They dominated politics following Italian unification in 1861, but never formed a party, basing their power on census suffrage and first-past-the-post voting system. The Right was opposed by the more progressive Historical Left, which overthrew Marco Minghetti's government during the so-called Parliamentary Revolution of 1876, which brought Agostino Depretis to become Prime Minister. However, Depretis immediately began to look for support among Rightist Members of Parliament, who readily changed their positions, in a context of widespread corruption. This phenomenon, known in Italian as trasformismo (roughly translatable in English as transformism—Prime Minister Giovanni Giolitti was depicted as a chameleon in a satirical newspaper), effectively removed political differences in Parliament, which was dominated by an undistinguished liberal bloc with a landslide majority until after World War I. Two parliamentary factions alternated in government, one led by Sidney Sonnino and the other, by far the largest of the two, by Giolitti. At that time, the Liberals governed in alliance with the Radicals, the Democrats and eventually the Reform Socialists. This alliance governed against two smaller opposition, namely the Clericals composed by some Vatican-oriented politicians and The Extreme formed by the socialist faction which represented a real left in a present-day concept.

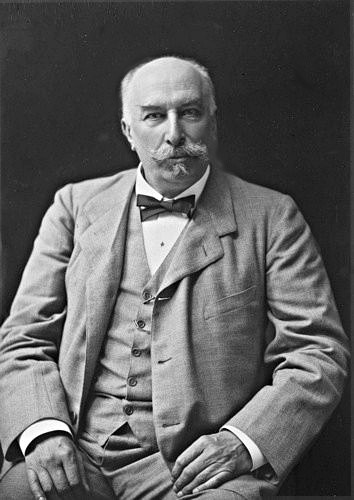
Giovanni Giolitti, historical leader of the Liberals

Giolitti was a master in the political art of trasformismo, the method of making a flexible centrist coalition of government which isolated the extremes of the left and the right in Italian politics after the unification. Under his influence, the Liberals did not develop as a structured party. They were instead a series of informal personal groupings with no formal links to political constituencies. The period between the start of the 20th century and the start of World War I, when he was Prime Minister and Minister of the Interior from 1901 to 1914 with only brief interruptions, is often called the Giolittian Era.

A left liberal with strong ethical concerns, Giolitti's periods in office were notable for the passage of a wide range of progressive social reforms which improved the living standards of ordinary Italians, together with the enactment of several policies of government intervention. Besides putting in place several tariffs, subsidies and government projects, Giolitti also nationalized the private telephone and railroad operators. Liberal proponents of free trade criticized the Giolittian System, although Giolitti himself saw the development of the national economy as essential in the production of wealth.

In the 1913 general election, the Liberals were voted by more than two millions people, with 47.6% of votes and gaining 270 out 508 seats, therefore becoming by far the first party of the country. Under the premiership of Antonio Salandra, a member of the right-wing faction of the Liberals, Italy declared war to Austria-Hungary and Germany in 1915, entering in World War I. This decision was against the thought of Liberal leader Giolitti, who was a strong supporter of neutrality. In 1917, a member of the party's left-wing, Vittorio Emanuele Orlando, became Prime Minister and during his government Italy defeated Austria, earning him the title Premier of Victory.

At the end of World War I, universal suffrage and proportional representation were introduced. These reforms caused big problems to the Liberals which found themselves unable to stop the rise of two mass parties, the Italian Socialist Party and the Italian People's Party which had taken the control of many local authorities in Northern Italy even before the war. The Italian particularity was that although the Catholic party opposed the Socialists in accordance with European standards, it was also in contrast with the Liberals and generally the right under the consequences of the capture of Rome and the struggles between the Holy See and the Italian state which the Liberals had ruled for more than fifty years. The general election in 1919 saw success for the Socialist Party led by Filippo Turati, which gained the 32.3% of the vote. Giolitti's Liberals came only fifth, with 8.6% of the vote and 41 seats, behind the Italian People's Party of Don Luigi Sturzo, with 20.5%. The Parliament was thus divided into three different blocks with huge instability while the Socialists and the rising Fascists instigators of political violence on opposite sides.

In this chaotic situation, the Liberals founded the Italian Liberal Party in 1922 which joined an alliance led by Fascists and formed a joint list for the 1924 general election, transforming the Fascists from a small political force into an absolute-majority party. Albeit banned by Benito Mussolini in 1925, many old Liberal politicians were given prestigious yet not influential political posts such as seats in the Senate, which was stripped of any real power by Fascist reforms.

== Electoral results ==
Election	Leader	Chamber of Deputies				
Election	Leader	Votes	%	Seats	+/–	Position
1913	Giovanni Giolitti	2,387,947	47.6	270 / 508	▲270	▲1st
1919	Giovanni Giolitti	490,384	8.6	41 / 508	▼229	▼5th
1921 (Note: In the 1921 election, 58 liberals were elected within the National Bloc list, while 43 candidates were elected outside the coalition, running solely as liberal members.)	Giovanni Giolitti	Into National Bloc		101 / 508	▲60	–
1921	Giovanni Giolitti	470,605	7.1	101 / 508	▲60	5th

== See also ==
- Liberalism and radicalism in Italy
