= Francesco Saverio Nitti =

Italian economist and political figure (1868–1953)

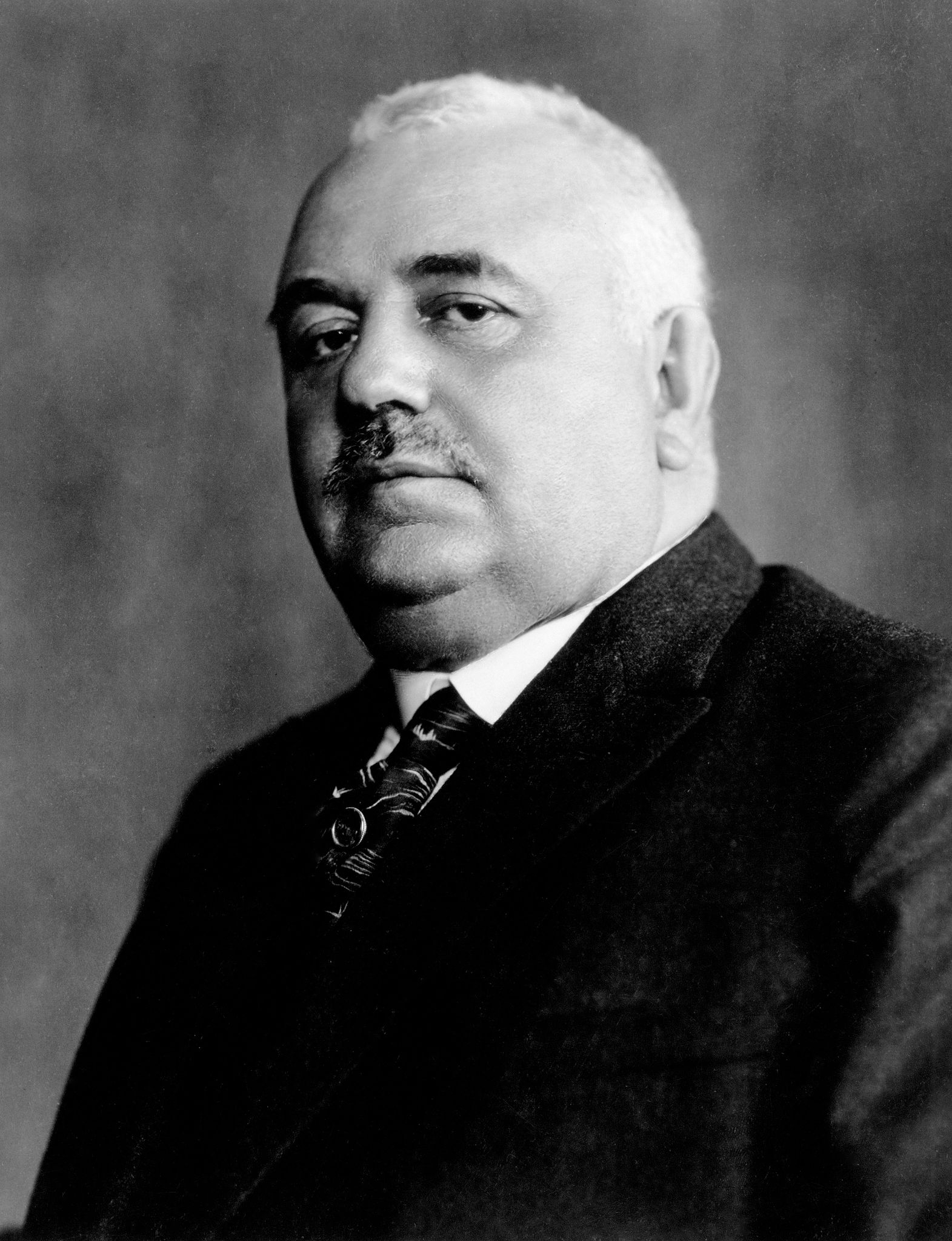
- Nitti in 1920

Prime Minister of Italy
- In office 23 June 1919 – 15 June 1920
- Monarch: Victor Emmanuel III
- Preceded by: Vittorio Emanuele Orlando
- Succeeded by: Giovanni Giolitti
Ministerial offices
Minister of the Interior
In office 23 June 1919 – 15 June 1920
Prime Minister	Himself
Preceded by	Vittorio Emanuele Orlando
Succeeded by	Giovanni Giolitti
Minister of the Treasury
In office 30 October 1917 – 18 January 1919
Prime Minister	Vittorio Emanuele Orlando
Preceded by	Paolo Carcano
Succeeded by	Bonaldo Stringher
Minister of Agriculture, Industry and Commerce
In office 29 March 1911 – 21 March 1914
Prime Minister	Giovanni Giolitti
Preceded by	Giovanni Raineri
Succeeded by	Giannetto Cavasola
Parliamentary offices
Member of the Senate of the Republic
In office 8 May 1948 – 20 February 1953 (Ex officio)
Member of the Constituent Assembly
In office 25 June 1946 – 31 January 1948
Constituency	Italy at-large
Member of the Chamber of Deputies
In office 30 November 1904 – 25 January 1924
Constituency	Muro Lucano

Personal details
- Born: Francesco Saverio Vincenzo de Paola Nitti; 19 July 1868 Melfi, Kingdom of Italy
- Died: 20 February 1953 (aged 84) Rome, Italy
- Party: Historical Far Left (1880s–1904); PR (1904–1922); PLD (1922–1926); Independent (1926–1946; 1948–1953); UDN (1946–1948)
- Education: University of Naples Federico II
- Profession: University professor

Francesco Saverio Nitti (Italian: [franˈtʃesko saˈvɛːrjo ˈnitti]; 19 July 1868 – 20 February 1953) was an Italian economist and statesman. A member of the Italian Radical Party, Nitti served as Prime Minister of Italy between 1919 and 1920. An opponent of the fascist regime in Italy, he opposed any kind of dictatorship throughout his career. According to the Catholic Encyclopedia in "Theories of Overpopulation", Nitti was also a staunch critic of English economist Thomas Robert Malthus and his Principle of Population; Nitti wrote Population and the Social System (1894). He was an important meridionalist and studied the origins of Southern Italian problems that arose after Italian unification.

== Career ==
Francesco Nitti was born in Melfi, to Vincezo Nitti, who fought for Garibaldi during the 1860s and his wife Filomena Coraggio. Nitti studied law in Naples and was subsequently active as journalist. He was correspondent for the Gazzetta Piemontese (English: Piedmontese Gazette) and was one of the editors of the Corriere di Napoli (Courier of Naples). In 1891, he wrote a work about Christian socialism, titled Il socialismo cattolico (Catholic Socialism). In 1898, when he was only 30 years old, he became professor of finance at the University of Naples. Nitti was chosen in 1904 for the Italian Radical Party to serve in the Italian Parliament. From 1911 to 1914, he was minister of agriculture, industry, and trade under the then prime minister Giovanni Giolitti. In 1917, he became minister of finance under Vittorio Emanuele Orlando and held it until 1919.

On 23 June 1919, Nitti became prime minister and interior minister, after Orlando had resigned following the disappointed Italian gains at the Paris Peace Conference, resulting in widespread indignation within Italy about an alleged mutilated victory. A year later, Nitti was also minister of the colonies. His cabinet had to deal with great social unrest and dissatisfaction over the peace treaties. Particularly troublesome was the agitation over Fiume led by Gabriele D'Annunzio. Nitti had great difficulty keeping the administration functioning at all, thanks to the enmity between the extremely divergent political factions of communists, anarchists, and fascists. After less than a year as head of government, he resigned and was succeeded by the veteran Giolitti on 16 June 1920. In social policy, Nitti's government passed a law setting up compulsory insurance for unemployment, invalidity and old age.

From 1901 to 1924, Nitti was a member of the country's Chamber of Deputies, first for the Italian Radical Party and then for the Italian Democratic Liberal Party. Still a member of the Italian Parliament, Nitti offered resistance to the nascent power of Italian fascism and openly despised Benito Mussolini. In 1924, Nitti decided to emigrate, and returned to Italy only after World War II, and joined the National Democratic Union and was a member of the Senate for the Republic in the Independent Left group from 1948 until his death in 1953. As a secularist and anticlerical, he opposed Christian Democracy and staunchly opposed NATO membership. In his 1927 book Bolshevism, Fascism and Democracy, Nitti correlated fascism with Bolshevism, saying: "There is little difference between the two, and in certain respects, Fascism and Bolshevism are the same." At the same time, as a positivist, for Nitti both politics and history boiled down to facts. Like World War II, the Russian Revolution was a fact. Against the opinion of Georges Clemenceau, who considered the Russians to be perfectible ignorant barbarians and the Germans to be imperfectly educated barbarians, Nitti wondered what would have prevented them from getting along with Bolshevik Russia, once they had got along well with the Russia of the Tsars. Referring to modernisation, he wrote: "Transplanting the principles and methods of the Russian Revolution into a country like Italy ... would be certain ruin. But it can be added that there is something in the spirit of the Russian Revolution that even Italy cannot ignore."

== Personal life ==
Nitti married Maria Antonia Persico (1870-1948) in 1898. Their daughter was expert on Indian culture Luigia Nitti-Dolci (1903-1939), who died of Embolus.

== Notable works ==
- Population and the Social System (1894)
- Catholic Socialism (1895, reprinted 1908)
- Eroi e briganti (Heroes and brigands) (1899; reprinted by Osanna Edizioni, 2015) - ISBN 8881674696, 9788881674695)
- L'Italia all'alba del secolo XX (1901)
- Principi di scienza delle finanzie (1903, 1904; 5th ed., 1922). French translation: Principes de science des finances, (1904)
- Peaceless Europe (1922)
- The Decadence of Europe (1922)
- The Wreck of Europe (1923)
- Bolshevism, Fascism and Democracy (1927)

Political offices
Preceded by Vittorio Emanuele Orlando	Prime Minister of Italy; 1919–1920	Succeeded by Giovanni Giolitti
Preceded by Vittorio Emanuele Orlando	Italian Minister of the Interior; 1919–1920	Succeeded by Giovanni Giolitti
