= Italian People's Party (1919) =

Political party, 1919–1926

Italian People's Party Partito Popolare Italiano
- Abbreviation: PPI
- General Secretary: Luigi Sturzo (1919–1923); Alcide De Gasperi (1923–1925)
- Founded: 18 January 1919
- Dissolved: 5 November 1926
- Merger of: UECI; FUCI; CC; PPT
- Succeeded by: Christian Democracy
- Headquarters: Rome, Italy
- Newspaper: Corriere d'Italia (1906–1923); Il Popolo (1923–1925)
- Ideology: Christian democracy (Italian); Political Catholicism; Christian corporatism; Autonomism
- Political position: Centre
- European affiliation: White International
- Colours: White
- Anthem: "O bianco fiore"

The Italian People's Party (Italian: Partito Popolare Italiano, PPI), also translated as Italian Popular Party, was a Christian democratic political party in Italy inspired by Catholic social teaching. It was active in the 1920s, but fell apart because it was deeply split between the pro- and anti-fascist elements. Its platform called for an elective Senate, proportional representation, corporatism, agrarian reform, women's suffrage, political decentralisation, independence of the Roman Catholic Church, and welfare legislation.

== History ==
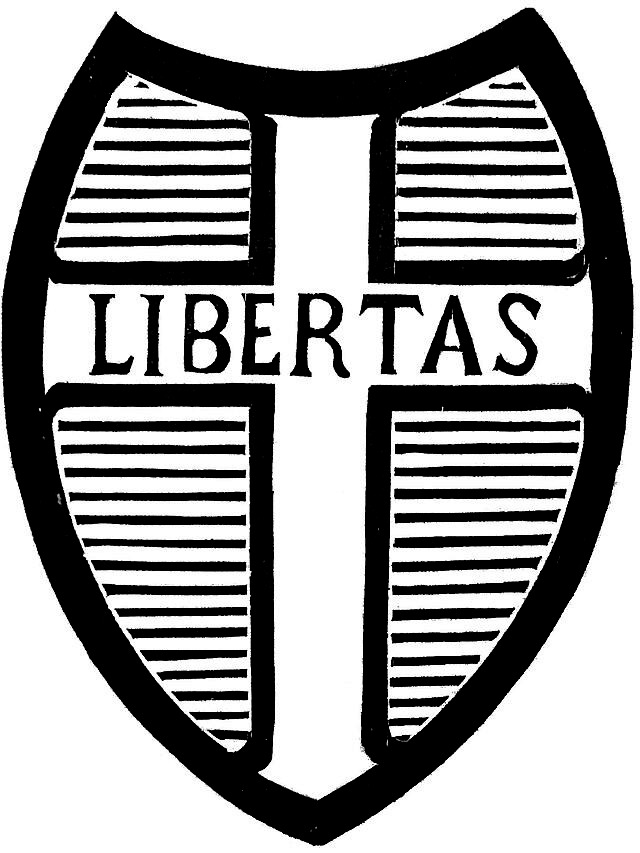
Electoral logo of the PPI (1919)

The Italian People's Party was cofounded in 1919 by Luigi Sturzo, a Sicilian Catholic priest. The PPI was backed by Pope Benedict XV to oppose the Italian Socialist Party (PSI). The party supported various social reforms, including the foundations of a welfare state, women's suffrage and proportional representation voting.

In the 1919 general election, the first in which the PPI took part, the party won 20.5% of the vote and 100 seats in the Chamber of Deputies, a result virtually confirmed in 1921. The PPI was the second largest Italian political party after the PSI at the time. Its heartlands were interior Veneto and north-western Lombardy. In 1919 the party won 42.6% in Veneto (49.4% in Vicenza), 30.1% in Lombardy (64.3% in Bergamo), 24.4% in Friuli-Venezia Giulia, 27.3% in the Marche and 26.2% in Lazio, while it was much weaker in Piedmont and in Southern Italy.

The PPI was divided mainly into two factions: the "Christian Democrats" were favourable to an accord with the Socialists, while the "Moderate Clericalists" supported an alliance with the liberal parties, which eventually happened. The latter included Alcide De Gasperi. Some Populars took part in Benito Mussolini's first government in 1922, leading the party to a division between opponents of Mussolini and those who supported him. The latter eventually joined the National Fascist Party. Most of the PPI members later took part in Christian Democracy.

John Molony argues that, "In the end, "the Italian fascist state and the Vatican worked hand in hand to help destroy the People's Party." He adds that Liberals and the Socialists hated the PPI almost as much as the Fascists did and saw too late how necessary it was in the fight for democracy in Italy.

== Ideology ==
The party's ideological sources were principally to be found in Catholic social teaching, the Christian democratic doctrines developed from the 19th century, and on the political thought of Romolo Murri and Luigi Sturzo. The Papal encyclical Rerum novarum (1891) of Pope Leo XIII, offered a basis for social and political doctrine.

== Electoral results ==
Election	Leader	Chamber of Deputies				
Election	Leader	Votes	%	Seats	+/–	Position
1919	Luigi Sturzo	1,167,354	20.5	100 / 508	▲100	▲2nd
1921	Luigi Sturzo	1,347,305	20.4	108 / 535	▲8	2nd
1924	Alcide De Gasperi	645,789	9.0	39 / 535	▼69	2nd
