= 1904 in Italy =

- Decades: 1880s; 1890s; 1900s; 1910s; 1920s
- See also: History of Italy; Timeline of Italian history; List of years in Italy

Events from the year 1904 in Italy.

== Kingdom of Italy ==
- Monarch – Victor Emmanuel III (1900–1946)
- Prime Minister – Giovanni Giolitti (1903–1905)
- Population – 33,237,000

== Events ==
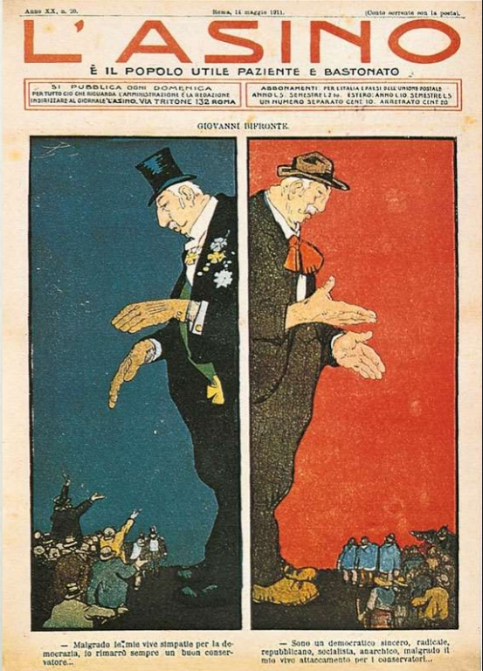
This cartoon in the satirical magazine L'Asino in May 1911, described the policy of Giolitti: on the one hand, dressed in elegant suit, he reassures conservatives; on the other, with clothes less elegant, he is addressing the workers. (L'Asino, May 14, 1911)

The Giolittian Era. During his second and third tenure as prime minister (1903–1905 and 1906–1909), Giovanni Giolitti courts the left and labour unions with social legislation, including subsidies for low-income housing, preferential government contracts for worker cooperatives, and old age and disability pensions. Economic expansion was secured by monetary stability, moderate protectionism and government support of production. Foreign trade doubled between 1900 and 1910, wages rose, and the general standard of living went up. Nevertheless, the period was also marked by a sharp increase in the frequency and duration of industrial action, with major labour strikes.

=== February ===
- February 17 – The opera Madama Butterfly by Giacomo Puccini, premieres at La Scala in Milan. It was withdrawn after a disastrous premiere and Puccini substantially rewrote it.

=== April ===
- April 8–11 – At the Eighth Congress of the Italian Socialist Party in Bologna the revolutionary syndicalists led by Arturo Labriola and Enrico Ferri's left centre together win a clear majority, ending the cautious rapprochement of the reformist leader Filippo Turati with Giolitti to advance social reforms.
- April 24 – Official visit of French president Émile Loubet to Rome.

=== July ===
- July 4 – Piero Ginori Conti tests the first-ever geothermal power generator at the Larderello dry steam field in Italy. It was a small generator that lit four light bulbs.

=== September ===
- September 4 – During a crackdown on a miners' strike in Buggerru (it), Sardinia, three workers are killed and 20 injured.
- September 14 – In the small agricultural town of Castelluzzo (province of Trapani, Sicily), two peasants are killed and about 10 people wounded during a protest against the dissolution of a meeting of their local cooperative and the arrest of a socialist leader of that cooperative.
- September 16 – Start of the 1904 Italian general strike, making it the first general strike in Italian history. The strike was called by the Chambers of Labour in several cities in response to killings of striking workers in the preceding weeks. Prime Minister Giovanni Giolitti refuses to intervene and this attitude prevents the movement to take revolutionary dimensions while the strike petered out. In response, Pope Pius X gives tacit permission to Catholic candidates to stand in parliamentary to counter the red menace.
- September 27 – Prime Minister Giovanni Giolitti visits the German chancellor Bernhard von Bülow to allay concerns in Berlin by the French-Italian rapprochement in relation with the Triple Alliance.

=== November ===
- November 6 – First round of the Italian general election.
- November 13 – Second round of the Italian general election. The "ministerial" left-wing bloc of the Historical Left led by Giovanni Giolitti remains the largest in Parliament, winning 339 of the 508 seats. The papal ban on Catholics voting was relaxed for the first time, and three Catholics were elected.

== Births ==
- February 3 – Luigi Dallapiccola, Italian composer (d. 1975)
- April 10 – Nino Pavese, Italian actor (d. 1979)
- April 18 – Giuseppe Terragni, Italian Rationalist architect (d. 1943)
- August 28 – Secondo Campini, Italian jet pioneer (d. 1980)
- November 25 – Toni Ortelli, Italian composer and alpinist (d. 2000)

== Deaths ==
- Emilio Comba, Waldensian pastor and historian (b. 1839)
- February 12 – Antonio Labriola, Italian Marxist theoretician (b. 1843)
