= Comba =

Comba may refer to:

== People ==
- A saint named Comba in Galician language, a fusion of two female saints: Columba of Sens and Columba of Spain.
- Comba (surname), an Italian surname

== Places ==
- Comba (Lycia), ancient city of Lycia
- Comba, Goa, town and suburb of the city of Margao, India

== Space ==
- 7636 Comba

== See also ==
- Combas
- Robert Combas (born 1957), French painter and sculptor
- Santa Comba (disambiguation), the name of several places
- Combi (disambiguation)
