= Comba (surname) =

Comba is an Italian surname. Notable people with the surname include:

- Emilio Comba (1839–1904), Waldensian pastor and historian
- Enrico Comba (1956–2020), Italian historian and anthropologist
- Franck Comba (born 1971), French rugby union player
- Ivano Comba (1960–2022), Italian professional footballer
- Maximiliano Comba (born 1994), Argentine professional footballer
- Paul G. Comba (1926–2017), Italian astronomer
- Rocío Comba (born 1987), Argentine discus thrower
- Sérgio Comba (born 1978), Argentine footballer

== See also ==
- Comba (disambiguation)
- Combi (disambiguation)
