= Santa Comba =

Santa Comba may refer to:

== People ==
- Columba of Sens
- Columba of Spain
- Columba of Cornwall

== Places ==
=== Portugal ===
- Santa Comba Dão, a city and municipality
- Santa Comba (Ponte de Lima), a parish in the district of Ponte de Lima
- Santa Comba (Seia), a parish in the district of Seia
- Santa Comba (Vila Nova de Foz Côa), a parish in the district of Vila Nova de Foz Côa
- Santa Comba de Rossas, a parish in the district of Bragança

=== Spain ===
- Santa Comba, Galicia, a municipality in A Coruña province, Galicia
