= Italian Democratic Liberal Party =

Political party, 1921–1926

Italian Democratic Liberal Party Partito Liberale Democratico Italiano
- Founder: Antonio Salandra
- Founded: 14 April 1921
- Dissolved: 8 October 1922
- Preceded by: Liberals, Democrats and Radicals
- Ideology: Liberalism; Radicalism
- Political position: Centre
- National affiliation: National List (1924–1926)

The Italian Democratic Liberal Party (Italian: Partito Liberale Democratico Italiano, PLDI) was a liberal and radical political party in Italy during the earlier decades of the 20th century. Initially, the party was an alliance between progressive liberals, called Liberals, Democrats, and Radicals.

== History ==
The Liberals, Democrats and Radicals' alliance was formed for the 1919 Italian general election. It came third after the Italian Socialist Party and the Italian People's Party, with 15.9% and 96 seats, doing particularly well in Piedmont and Southern Italy, especially in Sicily, the home region of party's leader and former Prime Minister Vittorio Emanuele Orlando.

The party was formed for the 1921 Italian general election by the union of individual politicians, most of whom had taken part in the joint electoral lists between the Italian Radical Party and the Italian Liberal Party in many single-seat constituencies of the country in 1919, gaining 16.0% of the vote and 96 seats in the Chamber of Deputies. In 1921, it gained 10.5% of the vote and 68 seats, doing particularly well in Piedmont and Southern Italy. The party suffered a strong setback in the 1924 Italian general election, which was held under strong intimidation from the fascist Blackshirts, and saw its share of votes decrease to 2.2%, electing 14 seats.

The party finally merged into the Italian Liberal Party in 1922.

== Ideology ==
The party was the expression of liberalism and radicalism in Italy and the middle class, including cities' bourgeoisie, small business owners, and artisans among its supporters. There was also a main group of Radicals, who supported universal suffrage and universal public schooling for all children.

== Electoral results ==
Chamber of Deputies
Election year	Votes	%	Seats	+/−	Leader
1921	684,855 (4th)	10.4	68 / 535	▼28	Antonio Salandra
