= Ettore Sacchi =

Italian politician

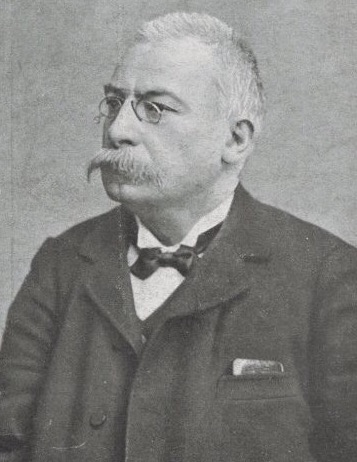

Minister of Grace and Justice
- In office 18 June 1916 – 18 January 1919
- Prime Minister: Paolo Boselli; Vittorio Emanuele Orlando
- Preceded by: Vittorio Emanuele Orlando
- Succeeded by: Luigi Facta
- In office 8 February 1906 – 29 May 1906
- Prime Minister: Sidney Sonnino
- Preceded by: Camillo Finocchiaro Aprile
- Succeeded by: Nicolò Gallo

Minister of Public Works
- In office 31 March 1910 – 29 March 1911
- Prime Minister: Luigi Luzzatti
- Preceded by: Giulio Rubini
- Succeeded by: Augusto Ciuffelli

Member of the Chamber of Deputies
- In office 23 November 1892 – 25 January 1924
- In office 22 November 1882 – 22 October 1890
- Constituency: Cremona

Personal details
- Born: 31 May 1851 Cremona, Kingdom of Lombardy–Venetia
- Died: 6 April 1924 (aged 72) Rome, Kingdom of Italy
- Party: Radical Party
- Occupation: Lawyer and politician

Ettore Sacchi (31 May 1851 – 6 April 1924) was an Italian lawyer and politician. He was one of the founders and main leaders of the Italian Radical Party.

== Biography ==
Ettore Sacchi was born in Cremona in the Kingdom of Lombardy–Venetia on 31 May 1851. He graduated in law at the University of Pavia. During these years, he became a member of the Historical Far Left, the classical radical movement active in Italy in the second half of the 19th century.

After the 1882 general election, Sacchi became a member of the Italian Chamber of Deputies. In 1898, after the death of the left-wing leader Felice Cavallotti, Sacchi became the new head of The Extreme and started a process of modernization that ended in 1904, when he officially founded the Italian Radical Party.

Sacchi abandoned increasingly left-wing ideologies, switching the PR into a more moderate party. Moreover, after the assassination of King Umberto I, Sacchi exalted him and for this was accused of monarchism, by the socialists.

In 1906, he became Minister of Grace and Justice under the premiership of Sidney Sonnino and in 1910 he was appointed by Luigi Luzzatti, Minister of Public Works.

In the 1910s, Sacchi implemented a political alliance with the dominant leader of that decade, Giovanni Giolitti, who led the centrist Liberal Union.

When World War I broke out, Sacchi was one of the main supporters of neutralism. In 1916, Sacchi was again appointed Minister of Justice in the cabinets of the liberals Paolo Boselli and Vittorio Emanuele Orlando.

In 1919, Sacchi resigned and withdrew support from Orlando's government, but in the general election of the same year the Radicals lost many votes, and in the 1921 election, Sacchi did not succeed in being re-elected in the Italian Parliament.

Sacchi died in Rome on 6 April 1924, in poverty.
