= 1904 Italian general election =

- 6 November 1904 (first round); 13 November 1904 (second round)

All 508 seats in the Chamber of Deputies 255 seats needed for a majority
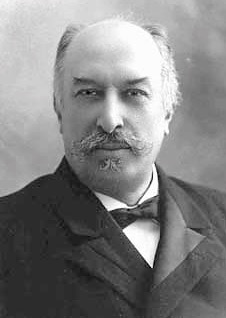

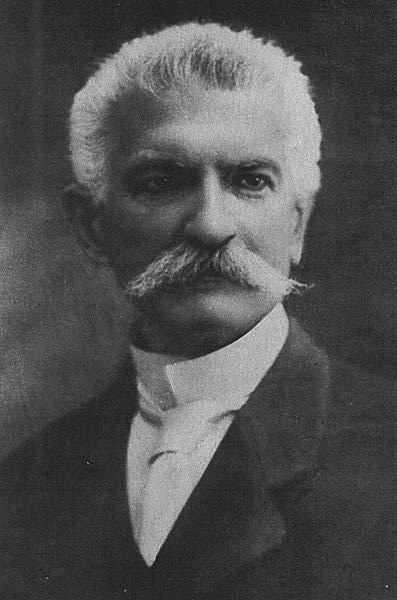

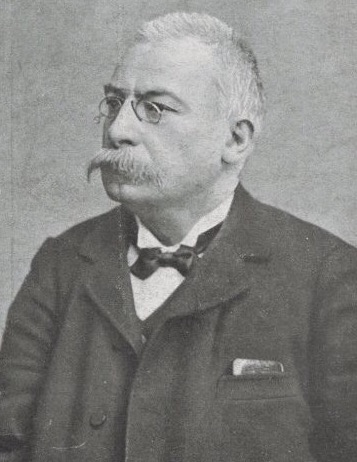

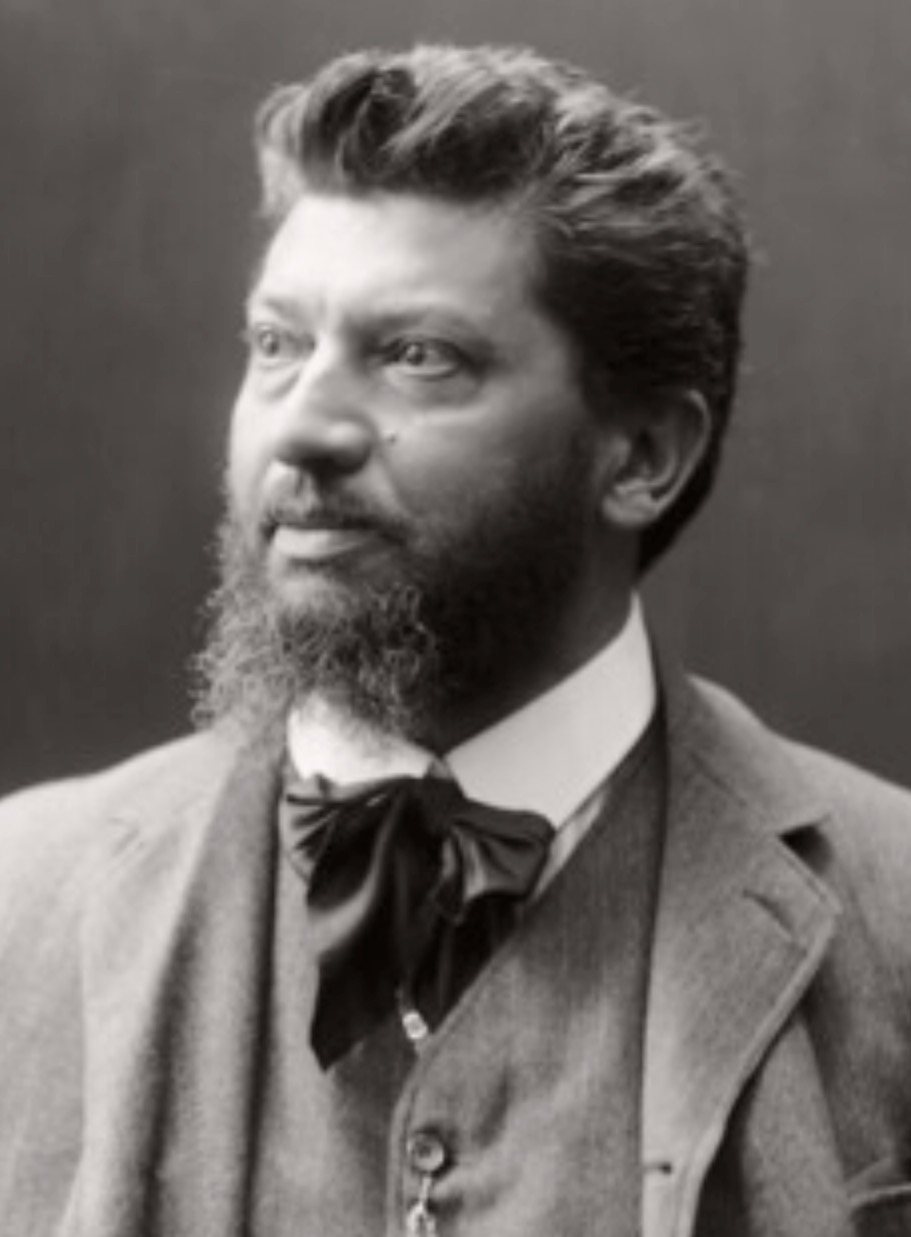

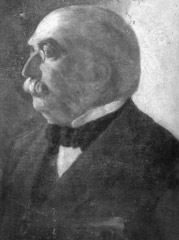
	Majority party	Minority party	Third party
Leader	Giovanni Giolitti	Sidney Sonnino	Ettore Sacchi
Party	Historical Left	Historical Right	Radical Party
Seats won	339	76	37
Seat change	▲43	▼40	▲3
Popular vote	777,345	212,584	128,002
Percentage	50.90%	13.92%	8.4%
Swing	▼1.38 pp	▼7.49 pp	▲1.3 pp
	Fourth party	Fifth party
Leader	Filippo Turati	Napoleone Colajanni
Party	PSI	PRI
Seats won	29	24
Seat change	▼4	▼5
Popular vote	326,016	75,225
Percentage	21.35%	4.9%
Swing	▲8.35 pp	▼1.3 pp
Prime Minister before election
Giovanni Giolitti
Historical Left
Elected Prime Minister
Giovanni Giolitti
Historical Left

General elections were held in Italy on 6 November 1904, with a second round of voting on 13 November. The "ministerial" left-wing bloc remained the largest in Parliament, winning 339 of the 508 seats. The papal ban on Catholics voting was relaxed for the first time, and three Catholics were elected.

== Background ==
After Giuseppe Saracco resignation as Prime Minister, Giuseppe Zanardelli was appointed as new head of the government; but he was unable to achieve much during his last term of office, as his health was greatly impaired. His Divorce Bill, although voted in the Chamber of Deputies, had to be withdrawn on account of the strong opposition of the country. He retired from the administration on 3 November 1903 and died on 26 December 1903.

The long-time liberal leader Giovanni Giolitti succeeded to Zanardelli. He courted the left and labour unions with social legislation, including subsidies for low-income housing, preferential government contracts for worker cooperatives, and old age and disability pensions. However, he, too, had to resort to strong measures in repressing some serious disorders in various parts of Italy, and thus he lost the favour of the Socialists.

== Electoral system ==
The election was held using 508 single-member constituencies. However, prior to the election the electoral law was amended so that candidates needed only an absolute majority of votes to win their constituency, abolishing the second requirement of receiving the votes of at least one-sixth of registered voters.

== Parties and leaders ==
Party	Ideology	Leader	Seats in 1900
Historical Left	Liberalism	Giovanni Giolitti	296
Historical Right	Conservatism	Sidney Sonnino	116
Italian Radical Party	Radicalism	Ettore Sacchi	34
Italian Socialist Party	Socialism	Filippo Turati	33
Italian Republican Party	Republicanism	Napoleone Colajanni	29

== Results ==
Party	Votes	%	Seats	+/–
Historical Left	777,345	50.90	339	+43
Italian Socialist Party	326,016	21.35	29	−4
Historical Right	212,584	13.92	76	−40
Italian Radical Party	128,002	8.38	37	+3
Italian Republican Party	75,225	4.93	24	−5
Italian Catholic Electoral Union	8,008	0.52	3	New
Total	1,527,180	100.00	508	0
Valid votes	1,527,180	95.81		
Invalid/blank votes	66,706	4.19		
Total votes	1,593,886	100.00		
Registered voters/turnout	2,541,327	62.72		
Source: National Institute of Statistics
