= Enrico Comba =

Italian historian and anthropologist (1956–2020)

- Born: 26 August 1956; Pinerolo, Italy
- Died: 17 April 2020 (aged 63); Saluzzo, Italy
- Education: University of Turin
- Occupations: Historian, anthropologist
- Known for: Studies on anthropology of religion and native peoples of North America

Enrico Comba (Pinerolo, 26 August 1956 – Saluzzo, 17 April 2020) was an Italian historian and anthropologist, teacher of anthropology of religion at the University of Turin.

== Biography ==
Comba studied at the University of Turin under the guidance of Francesco Remotti for anthropology, and Giovanni Filoramo for history of religions, two disciplines considered incompatible and which instead Comba tried to associate by collaborating with the two academics in the Religions Laboratory of the Intercultural Center of the city of Turin.

Comba disagreed with studies that considered the disappearance of the small religions of native peoples, overwhelmed by modernity, as inevitable, and instead thought that these peoples’ need to maintain their own cultural differences has developed religious practice for this purpose as a privileged expressive tool.

He devoted his studies to the analysis of religious systems and in particular of the mythological beliefs of native peoples of North America, carrying out field research in United States, in Canada and in Siberia. In the rituals of the natives Comba discovered the beliefs that these populations have of an exchange between the human world and the world of nature such that "the distinction between human beings and animal beings tends to disappear". Comba also dealt with the shamanic experience, identifying an anthropological and historical-religious category based not on mystical ecstasy but rather on the conception of the shaman as ""mediator of knowledge", capable of perceiving things which are beyond the ordinary from which power and authority derive".

Comba died in Saluzzo on 17 April 2020, aged 63, of COVID-19, during the pandemic in Italy.

== Main works ==
- Introduzione a Lévi-Strauss, Bari, Laterza, 2000.
- Entries America del Nord (nuovi movimenti religiosi); America del nord (religioni); Eschimesi; Ghost dance; Manitu; Medicine-man; Peyotismo; Pipa; Spirito guardiano; Sweat lodge; Visione, ricerca della, in Dizionario delle religioni, by Giovanni Filoramo. Turin: Einaudi, 1993.
- La maschera animale: caccia, mito e sciamanismo tra gli Indiani d'America, in Sguardi sulle Americhe: per un'educazione interculturale, by Laura Operti. Turin: Bollati Boringhieri, 1995, pp. 65-81.
- Movimenti religiosi e costruzione dell'indianità tra i nativi nordamericani, in Stati, etnie, culture, by Pietro Scarduelli. Milano: Guerini e Associati, 1996, pp. 155-79.
- Visioni dell'orso: ritualità e sciamanismo tra gli Indiani delle Pianure, in Bestie o Dei? L'animale nel simbolismo religioso, by Alessandro Bongioanni and Enrico Comba. Turin: Ananke, 1996, pp. 23-44.
- Nuovi movimenti religiosi nell'America del Nord, in Storia delle Religioni, by Giovanni Filoramo, vol. V: Religions of pre-Columbian America and of native peoples. Rome-Bari: Laterza, 1997, pp. 335-370.
- 435 entries in Dizionario di Antropologia, by Ugo Fabietti e Francesco Remotti. Bologna: Zanichelli, 1997.
- La vita in sogno: visione e destino tra gli Indiani delle Pianure, in Libertà o necessità? L'idea di destino nelle culture umane, by Alessandro Bongioanni and Enrico Comba. Turin: Ananke, 1998, pp. 189-199.
- Entries "Cannibalismo" (vol. II [1999], 557-561), "Culto" (vol. III [1999], 65-69), "Estasi: aspetti antropologici" (vol. III [1999], 421-425), "Etnologia" (vol. III [1999], 440-443), "Feticcio: la dimensione antropologica" (vol. III [1999], 551-553), "Maschera" (vol. IV [2000], 356-361), "Rito" (vol. V [2000], 359-362), "Sacrificio" (vol. V [2000], 367-371), in L'Universo del Corpo. Rome: Istituto della Enciclopedia Italiana, 1999-2000 [2000-2001].
- La dimensione storica del rito: la Danza del Sole degli Indiani delle Pianure, in Antropologia del rito: interpretazioni e spiegazioni, by P. Scarduelli. Turin: Bollati Boringhieri, 2000: p. 67-89.
- Testi religiosi degli Indiani del Nordamerica ("Classici delle Religioni"). Turin: UTET, 2001 [pp. 838].
- Riti e misteri degli Indiani d'America. Turin: UTET Libreria, 2003 [n.ed. 843 p.]
- La caverna nascosta e lo specchio del cielo: geografia sacra e mitologia delle Black Hills, in Il sacro e il paesaggio nell'America indigena. Acts of the international conference, Bologna, 1-2 ottobre 2002, edited by Davide Domenici, Carolina Orsini, Sofia Venturosi. Bologna: CLUEB, 2003: pp. 49–62.
- "Il Pubblico e il Segreto: ritualità e sacralità tra gli Indiani d'America", in La scena rituale: il teatro oltre le forme della rappresentazione, edited by Fernando Mastropasqua. Rome: Carocci, 2007: pp. 135–155.
- Antropologia delle religioni. Un'introduzione. Rome-Bari: Laterza, 2008 [pp. 226].
- L'antropologia delle religioni nell'epoca della globalizzazione, in Giovanni Filoramo (edited by), Le religioni e il mondo moderno. Vol. IV: Nuove tematiche e prospettive. Turin: Einaudi, 2009: pp. 669–695.
- Religioni primitive, in A. Melloni (edited by), Dizionario del Sapere Storico Religioso del Novecento. Bologna, Il Mulino, [2010], vol. 2: 1183-1195.
- Fra la terra e il cielo: le Black Hills e la cosmologia dei popoli nativi, in Alessandro Grossato (edited by), La Montagna Cosmica. Milan: Medusa, 2010: pp. 151–164.
- "L'universo dei nativi americani", "Lo sciamanismo dei nativi nordamericani", "L'arte pittografica degli Indiani delle Pianure", "Geografia sacra e mitologia delle Black Hills", "La Ghost Dance, Danza degli Spiriti", in Dario Seglie – Enrico Comba (edited by), L'Universo degli Indiani d'America: Cosmologia, vita quotidiana e sopravvivenza dei popoli delle Grandi Pianure, Turin: Marco Valerio, 2011: pp. 23–40, 49–72, 73–92, 93–111, 135–157.
