= Italian Radical Party =

1904–1922 Italian political party

Italian Radical Party Partito Radicale Italiano
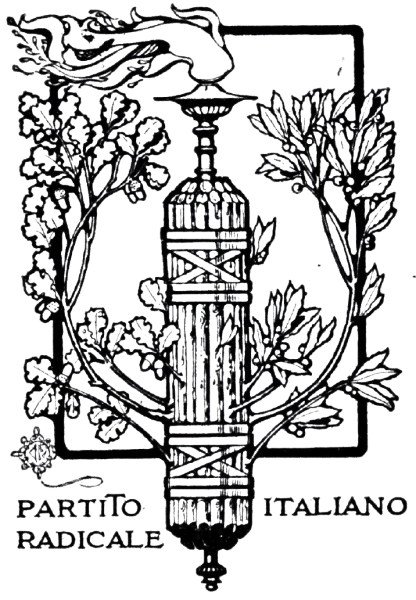
- Leaders: Ettore Sacchi; Francesco Saverio Nitti
- Founded: 27 May 1904; 122 years ago
- Dissolved: 26 April 1922; 104 years ago
- Preceded by: Historical Far Left
- Merged into: Social Democracy
- Ideology: Radicalism
- Political position: Centre-left
- National affiliation: Agreed Lists of Liberals, Democrats and Radicals (1919–1921)
- Colours: Dark green

The Italian Radical Party (Italian: Partito Radicale Italiano), also known as the Historical Radical Party (Partito Radicale storico), was a political party in Italy. Heir of the Historical Far Left and representative of Italy's political left in its beginning, with the rise of the Italian Socialist Party, it came to represent centre-left politics. The party was associated with radicalism, republicanism, secularism, social liberalism, and anti-clericalism.

== History ==
Since 1877, the Radical Party was active as a loose parliamentary group grown out from the Historical Far Left. The group was later organised as a full-fledged party in 1904 under the leadership of Ettore Sacchi. Leading Radicals included Ernesto Nathan (mayor of Rome with the support of the Italian Socialist Party and the Italian Republican Party from 1907 to 1913), Romolo Murri (a Catholic priest who was suspended from his ministry for having joined the party and who is widely considered in Italy the precursor of Christian democracy), and Francesco Saverio Nitti. The Radicals were originally strong in Lombardy, notably in the northern Province of Sondrio, the southeastern Province of Mantua, northern Veneto and Friuli, Emilia-Romagna, and central Italy, especially around Rome. Later on, they lost votes to the Socialists in Emilia and to the Republicans in Romagna but strengthened their position in Veneto, notably holding for almost twenty years the single-seat constituencies of Venice and Padua, which had also Radical mayors, and southern Italy, where they were previously virtually non-existent.

In the 1913 Italian general election, the Radicals obtained their best result with 10.4% of the vote and 62 seats in the Chamber of Deputies. With Nitti, a southerner, the Radicals became part of the governing coalition dominated by the Liberal Union of Giovanni Giolitti, who had positioned his party in the centre-left and supported many Radical reforms, while the Radicals had moved toward the centre. Nitti himself was the Italian Minister of the Treasury from 1917 to 1919 and Prime Minister of Italy from 1919 to 1920. In the 1919 Italian general election, the Radicals filed joint candidates with the Liberals in 54% of the constituencies. For the 1921 Italian general election, they joined forces with several minor liberal parties to form the Democratic Liberal Party. The joint list gained 15.9% of the vote and 96 seats, doing particularly well in Piedmont and the South.

After World War II, some former Radicals led by Nitti joined the National Democratic Union, along with the Italian Liberal Party and other elements of the political bloc that governed Italy from the years of Giolitti until the rise of Benito Mussolini's Italian fascist regime. The Radicals, who were once the far left of the Italian political spectrum, were finally associated with the old Liberal establishment, which was replaced by Christian Democracy as the leading political force in the country. Some left-wing elements of the old Radicals took part to the foundation of the Action Party in 1942, while a new Radical Party was launched in 1955 by the left wing of the former Liberals. These new Radicals, whose longtime leader was Marco Pannella, claimed to be the ideological successors of the Historical Far Left, such as Agostino Bertani and Felice Cavallotti, and the Radicals.

== Electoral results ==
Election	Leader	Chamber of Deputies				
Election	Leader	Votes	%	Seats	+/–	Position
1904	Ettore Sacchi	128,002	8.4	37 / 508	▲37	▲4th
1909	Ettore Sacchi	181,242	9.9	48 / 508	▲11	▲3rd
1913	Ettore Sacchi	522,522	10.4	62 / 508	▲14	3rd
1919	Francesco Saverio Nitti	110,697	2.0	12 / 508	▼50	▼7th

== Leadership ==
- Secretary: Giovanni Amici (1904–1914), Mario Cevolotto (1919–1920), Gino Bandini (1920–1921), Ernesto Pietriboni (1921–1922)
