= Liberals, Democrats and Radicals =

Defunct political alliance in Italy

Liberals, Democrats and Radicals Liberali, democratici e radicali
- Founded: 1919
- Dissolved: 1921
- Split from: Liberals; Italian Radical Party
- Succeeded by: Democratic Liberal Party
- Ideology: Liberalism; Radicalism
- Political position: Centre

The Agreed Lists of Liberals, Democrats and Radicals (Italian: Liste concordate di liberali, democratici e radicali) were a liberal and radical political alliance in Italy in the first decades of the 20th century.

== History ==
It was formed for the 1919 Italian general election, arriving third after the Italian Socialist Party and the Italian People's Party, with 15.9% and 96 seats, doing particularly well in Piedmont and Southern Italy.

== Ideology ==
The Liberals, Democrats, and Radicals were the expression of the liberalism and radicalism in Italy and the upper-middle class, such as cities' bourgeoisie, business owners, and artisans. In the alliance, there were also a main group of the Italian Radical Party. The alliance supported a right to vote and the public school for all children.

== Electoral results ==
Election	Chamber of Deputies				
Election	Votes	%	Seats	+/–	Position
1919	904,195	15.9	96 / 508	▲96	▲3rd
