= Democratic Party (Italy, 1919) =

Democratic Party Partito Democratico
- Founded: 1919
- Dissolved: 1921
- Succeeded by: Social Democracy
- Ideology: Social liberalism
- Political position: Centre to centre-left

The Democratic Party (Italian: Partito Democratico, PD) was an electoral alliance formed for the 1919 Italian general election by the union of several parties of the liberal left:

- Constitutional Democratic Party
- Constitutional-Democratic-Reformist Party
- Democratic Party
- Democratic Bloc
- Bloc of Democratic Concentration
- Bloc of Democrats and Combatants
- Party of Independent Democrats
- Popular Democratic Party
- Democratic-Social Union
- Christian Democratic Party.

In that occasion the party, that was especially strong in Southern Italy, gained 10.9% of the vote and 60 seats in the Chamber of Deputies.

== Electoral results ==
Chamber of Deputies
| Election year | Votes | % | Seats |
| 1919 | 622,310 (4th) | 10.9 | 60 / 508 |
