= Giovanni Filoramo =

Italian gnostic scholar

Giovanni Filoramo (born 18 May 1945) is an Italian scholar of gnosticism. A professor of History of Christianity at the University of Turin and he has published a number of books.

== Bibliography ==
(Partial)

- L’attesa della fine. Storia della gnosi (1983), English transl. A history of Gnosticism (1990)
- Il risveglio della gnosi ovvero diventare dio (1990)
- Cristianesimo e societa antica (co-author, 1992)
- Religione e modernita: il caso del fondamentalismo (2000)
- Manuale di storia delle religioni (co-author, 2003)
- Veggenti, profeti, gnostici. Identita e conflitti nel cristianesimo antico (2005)
- Cristianesimo (2007)
- La Chiesa e le sfide della modernita (2007)
