= Toni Ortelli =

Italian composer

Antonio "Toni" Ortelli (November 25, 1904 in Schio, Italy – March 3, 2000 in Schio) was an Italian alpinist, conductor and composer from the Veneto.

Ortelli is well known in the southern Alps regions of Italy, Austria and Switzerland for being the composer of the famous Trentino folk song "La Montanara" (The Song of the Mountains). Ortelli, according to his own account, conceived the melody and lyrics in 1927 while being on an excursion in the mountains of the Pian della Mussa in the Val d'Ala (Piedmont) and listening to the song of a shepherd. Luigi Pigarelli, under the pseudonym Pierluigi Galli, has added other vocal parts to harmonize it as a choral piece for men's choir. It has been translated into 148 languages.
