= 1919 Italian general election =

- 16 November 1919

All 508 seats in the Chamber of Deputies 255 seats needed for a majority
- Turnout: 56.58%
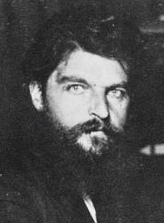

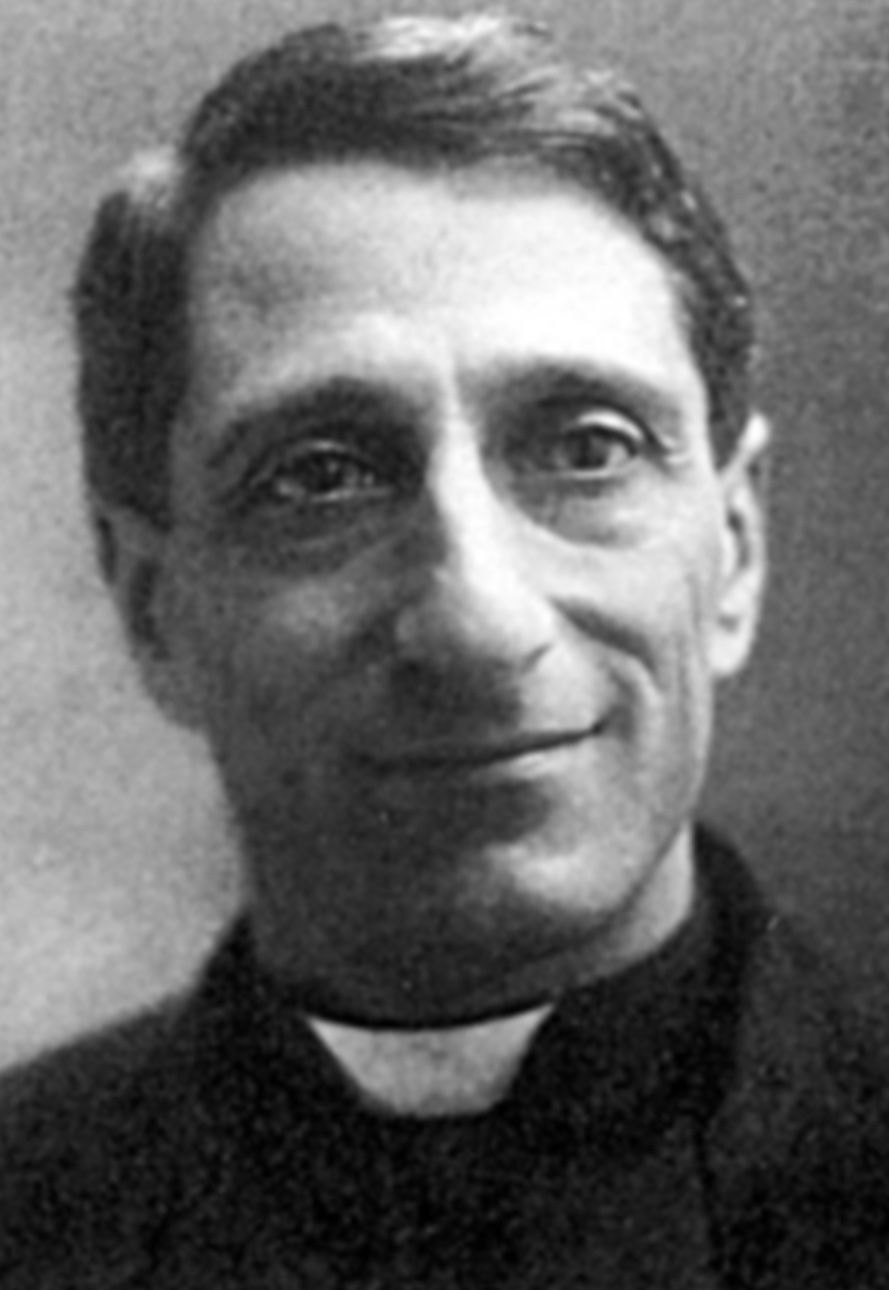

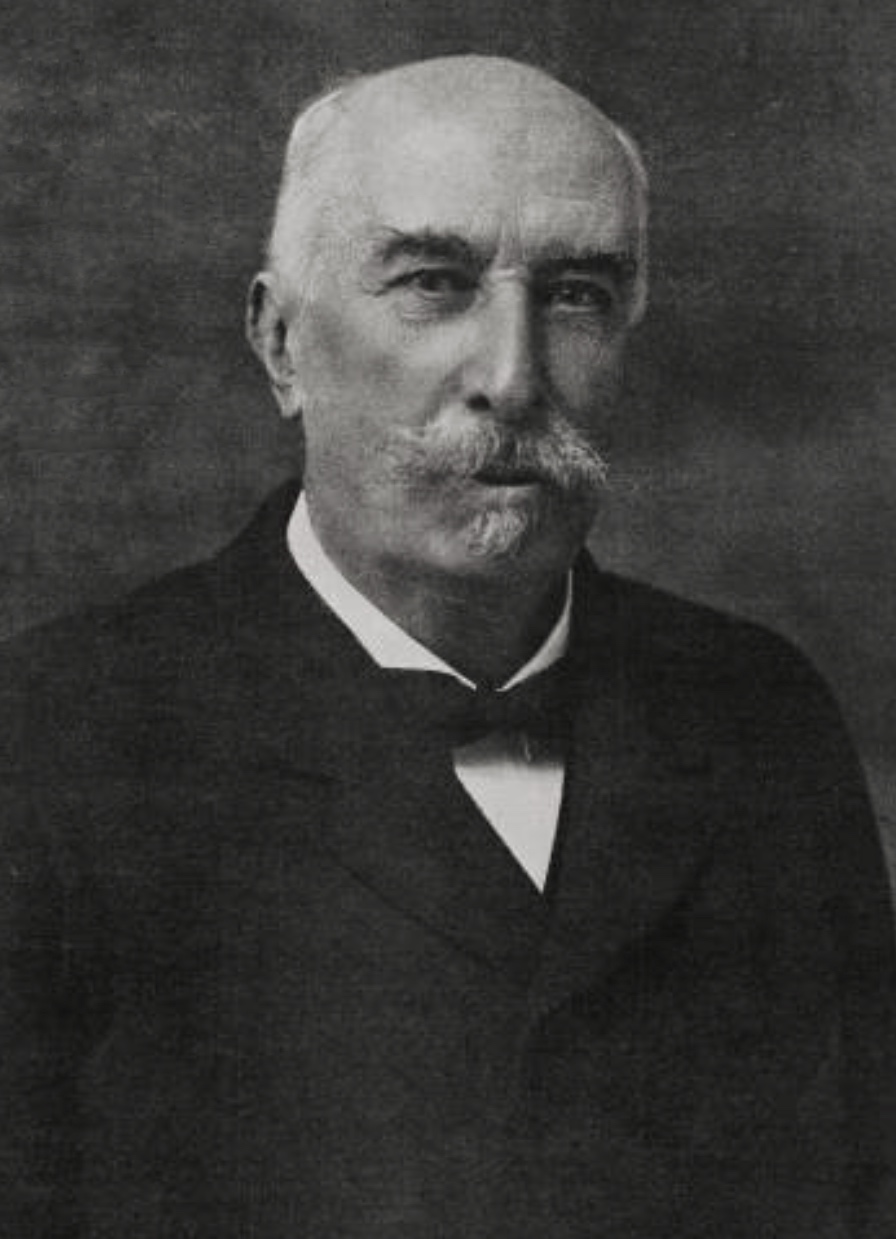
	Majority party	Minority party	Third party
			LDR
Leader	Nicola Bombacci	Luigi Sturzo	No leader
Party	PSI	PPI	LDR
Seats won	156	100	91
Seat change	▲104	New	New
Popular vote	1,834,792	1,167,354	904,195
Percentage	32.28%	20.53%	15.91%
	Fourth party	Fifth party	Sixth party
	PD		PdC
Leader	No leader	Giovanni Giolitti	No leader
Party	PD	PL	PdC
Seats won	60	41	20
Seat change	New	▼229	New
Popular vote	622,310	490,384	232,923
Percentage	10.98%	8.63%	4.10%
Swing	New	▼38.99pp	New
Prime Minister before election
Francesco Saverio Nitti
Radical Party
Elected Prime Minister
Francesco Saverio Nitti
Radical Party

General elections were held in Italy on 16 November 1919. The fragmented Liberal governing coalition lost the absolute majority in the Chamber of Deputies, due to the success of the Italian Socialist Party and the Italian People's Party.

A new election law had expanded the voting rights to a larger section of the population and established a proportional representation system.

== Background ==
The elections took place in the middle of Biennio Rosso ("Red Biennium") a two-year period, between 1919 and 1920, of intense social conflict in Italy, following the First World War. The revolutionary period was followed by the violent reaction of the Fascist blackshirts militia and eventually by the March on Rome of Benito Mussolini in 1922.

The Biennio Rosso took place in a context of economic crisis at the end of the war, with high unemployment and political instability. It was characterized by mass strikes, worker manifestations as well as self-management experiments through land and factories occupations. In Turin and Milan, workers councils were formed and many factory occupations took place under the leadership of anarcho-syndicalists. The agitations also extended to the agricultural areas of the Padan plain and were accompanied by peasant strikes, rural unrests and guerrilla conflicts between left-wing and right-wing militias.

== Electoral system ==
The Italian parliament passed a law on August 15, 1919 that replaced the uninominal-majoritarian system with a proportional representation system that apportioned seats based on the D'Hondt method.

The new electoral law introduced in 1919 increased the electorate by more than a quarter to 11 million. It gave all those who had fought at the front in the First World War the right to vote, regardless of their age, as well as all other men over the age of 21. The old system of using single-member constituencies with two-round majority voting was abolished and replaced with proportional representation in 58 constituencies with between 5 and 20 members. The new system favoured parties such as the socialist PSI, which was able to mobilise voters through trade unions, cooperatives and other mass organisations, and the Catholic PPI, which could rely on the support of church associations.

== Parties and leaders ==
Party	Ideology	Leader	Seats in 1913
Liberal Party (PL)	Liberalism	Giovanni Giolitti	270
Italian Radical Party (PR)	Radicalism	Francesco Saverio Nitti	62
Italian Socialist Party (PSI)	Socialism	Nicola Bombacci	52
Italian People's Party (PPI)	Christian democracy	Luigi Sturzo	29
Italian Reformist Socialist Party (PSRI)	Social democracy	Leonida Bissolati	19
Italian Republican Party (PRI)	Republicanism	Salvatore Barzilai	8
Democratic Party (PD)	Social liberalism	No leader	Did not exist
Liberals, Democrats and Radicals (LDR)	Liberalism	No leader	Did not exist
Combatants' Party (PdC)	Veterans' interests	No leader	Did not exist
Economic Party (PE)	Conservatism	Ferdinando Bocca	Did not exist

== Results ==
The fragmented Liberal governing coalition lost the absolute majority in the Chamber of Deputies, due to the success of the Italian Socialist Party and the Italian People's Party. The Socialists of Nicola Bombacci received the most votes in almost every region and especially in Emilia-Romagna (60.0%), Piedmont (49.7%), Lombardy (45.9%), Tuscany (41.7%) and Umbria (46.5%), while the People's Party were the largest party in Veneto (42.6%) and came second in Lombardy (30.1%) and the Liberal lists were stronger in Southern Italy (over 50% in Abruzzo, Campania, Basilicata, Apulia, Calabria and Sicily).

Party	Votes	%	Seats	+/–
Italian Socialist Party	1,834,792	32.28	156	+104
Italian People's Party	1,167,354	20.53	100	New
Liberals, Democrats and Radicals	904,195	15.91	96	New
Democratic Party	622,310	10.95	60	New
Liberal Party	490,384	8.63	41	−229
Combatants' Party	232,923	4.10	20	New
Italian Radical Party	110,697	1.95	12	−50
Economic Party	87,450	1.54	7	New
Italian Reformist Socialist Party	82,157	1.45	6	−13
Radicals, Republicans, Socialists and Combatants	65,421	1.15	5	New
Italian Republican Party	53,197	0.94	4	−4
Independent Socialists	33,938	0.60	1	−7
Total	5,684,818	100.00	508	0
Valid votes	5,684,818	98.12		
Invalid/blank votes	108,674	1.88		
Total votes	5,793,492	100.00		
Registered voters/turnout	10,239,326	56.58		
Source: National Institute of Statistics

Popular vote
PSI	32.28%
PPI	20.53%
LDR	15.91%
PD	10.95%
PL	8.63%
PdC	4.10%
PR	1.95%
PE	1.54%
PSRI	1.45%
RRSC	1.15%
PRI	0.94%
SI	0.60%

Seats
PSI	30.71%
PPI	19.69%
LDR	18.90%
PD	11.81%
PL	8.07%
PdC	3.94%
PR	2.36%
PE	1.38%
PSRI	1.18%
RRSC	0.98%
PRI	0.79%
SI	0.20%

=== Leading parties by region ===
Region	First party	Second party	Third party
Abruzzo-Molise	LDR–PL	PSI	PPI
Apulia	LDR–PL	PSI	PPI
Basilicata	LDR–PL	PSI	PPI
Calabria	LDR–PL	PPI	PSI
Campania	LDR–PL	PPI	PSI
Emilia-Romagna	PSI	LDR–PL	PPI
Lazio	LDR–PL	PPI	PSI
Liguria	LDR–PL	PSI	PPI
Lombardy	PSI	PPI	LDR–PL
Marche	PSI	LDR–PL	PPI
Piedmont	PSI	LDR–PL	PPI
Sardinia	LDR–PL	PPI	PSI
Sicily	LDR–PL	PPI	PSI
Tuscany	PSI	LDR–PL	PPI
Umbria	PSI	LDR–PL	PPI
Veneto	PPI	PSI	LDR–PL

== Sources ==
- Duggan, Christopher (2013). Fascist Voices: An Intimate History of Mussolini's Italy, New York, NY: Oxford University Press ISBN 978-0-19-973078-0
