= Ivano Comba =

Italian footballer (1960–2022)

Personal information
- Date of birth: 24 August 1960
- Place of birth: Pinerolo, Italy
- Date of death: 2 February 2022 (aged 61)
- Height: 1.68 m (5 ft 6 in)
- Position: Defender

Youth career
- –1979: Juventus

Senior career*
Years	Team	Apps	(Gls)
1979–1980	Ternana		
1980–1981	Spezia		
1981–1982	Sant'Angelo		
1982–1988	Piacenza		
1988–1989	S.P.A.L.		
1990–1992	Formia		
1992–1993	Pinerolo		
- * Club domestic league appearances and goals

Ivano Comba (24 August 1960 – 2 February 2022) was an Italian professional footballer who played as a defender for Ternana and Spezia. He died on 2 February 2022, at the age of 61.
