= Emilio Comba =

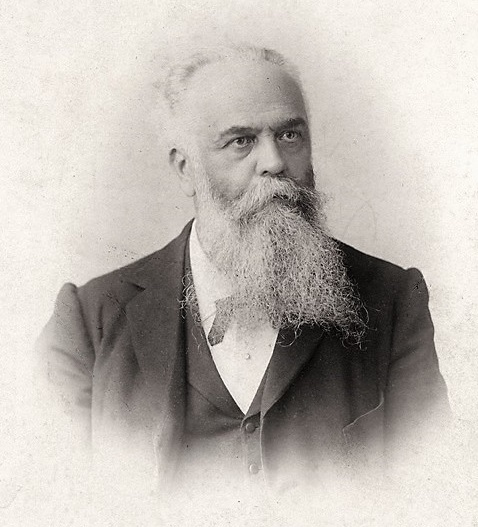

Emilio Comba (1839–1904) was a celebrated Waldensian pastor and historian, he was born in San Germano Chisone, Piedmont, Italy.

== Works ==
- 1880 Storia dei Valdesi avanti la Reforma
- 1885 Un sinodo anabattista a Venezia anno 1550
- 1897 I Nostri Protestanti - 2 volumes

== His son, Ernesto Comba ==
In 1922 the Waldensian school was transferred from Florence to Rome with Emilio's son Teofilo Ernesto Comba as professor of the theological faculty.

- 1923 Storia dei Valdesi Torre Pellice
- 1927 De Waldenzen, hun Oorsprong en Geschiedenis Kampen, J. H. Kok.

Ernesto Comba presented arguments to demonstrate that the name Waldenses derived from valley ("vallis densa" valdensis) and that they already existed before the time of Peter Waldo.
