= Columba of Sens =

Nun from northwestern Spain

Saint Columba of Sens
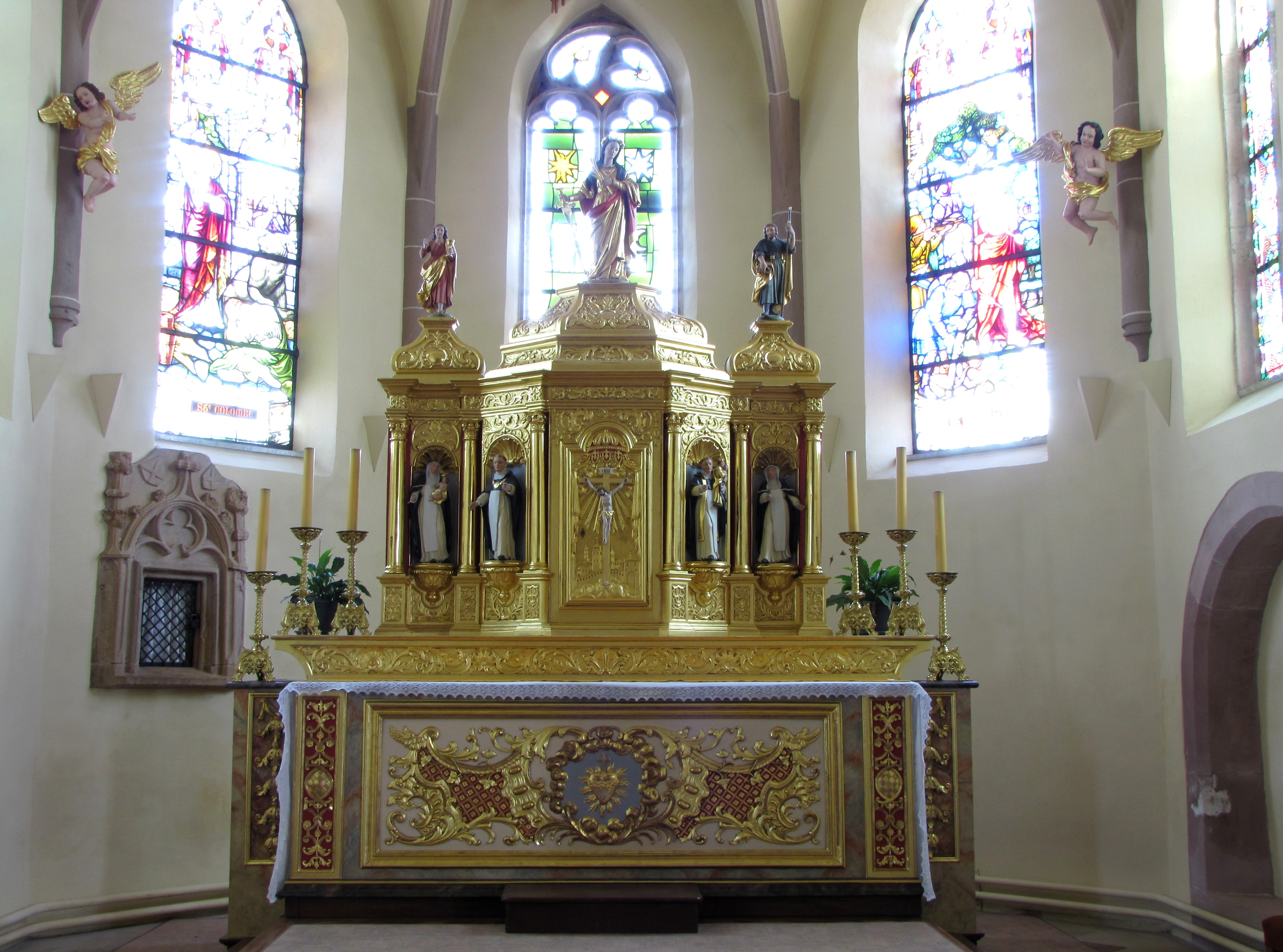
- Main altar of Église Saint-Colombe, Hattstatt, France. The statue on top depicts Columba of Sens (click on picture to enlarge).
- Born: c. 257; Gallaecia
- Died: 273; Sens, Gaul
- Venerated in: Roman Catholicism
- Major shrine: Abbey of Sens
- Feast: 31 December
- Attributes: she-bear, crowned maiden in chains, with a dog or bear on a chain, holding a book and a peacock's feather, with an angel on a funeral pyre, or beheaded
- Patronage: Andorra

Columba of Sens (probably born Eporita, d. 273; Galician: Santa Comba de Sens), was a virgin and nun who was born to a noble pagan family in the northwest of the Iberian Peninsula. She left Gallaecia for Gaul as a child to avoid being denounced as a Christian and received the baptismal name Columba, meaning "dove" in French. She settled in Sens, France, where the Roman emperor Aurelian noticed her and tried to force her to marry his son. When she refused, he imprisoned her. She was protected from being burned alive by a female bear and a miraculous rain shower, but was finally beheaded. Columba was venerated throughout France; a chapel was later built over her relics and the Abbey of Sens, which at one time was a pilgrimage site in her honor, was eventually built there.

Columba is portrayed "as a crowned maiden in chains", with a dog or bear on a chain, holding a book and a peacock's feather, with an angel on a funeral pyre, or beheaded. Her principal attribute is a she-bear. Her feast day is 31 December. Her cult was probably a combination of two virgin martyrs, Columba of Spain and Columba of Sens. In 1595, Italian poet and writer Lucrezia Marinella wrote an allegorical Christian epic poem about Columba.

The municipality of Santa Comba, in Galicia, is named after Columba of Sens.

== Life ==
Columba was born to a noble pagan family in modern Galicia, the northwestern region of Spain. According to Catholic historian Florence Capes, Columba's history "is somewhat legendary" writer Fernando Lanzi called it "hardly historical". Columba fled as a child to Vienne, France and was baptized, receiving the name Columba (meaning "dove" in French). According to hagiographer Omer Englebert, she left Spain for France because she had been told it was where "a more beautiful religion flourished" and because she "had an insurmountable horror of idols". Historian Katharine Rabenstein stated that according to legend, Columba left Spain with other believers to avoid being denounced as a Christian. Columba continued to Sens, near Paris in north-central France, where she was martyred in 273.

Aurelian, the Roman emperor (270–275), passed through Sens and put all the Christians there to death, but as Englebert reported, "Alone, Columba found favour in his eyes, such was the nobility and the beauty of her features revealing her high origin". He wanted her to marry his son, but she refused, so he locked her up in a brothel in the town amphitheater. She was protected from harm by a female bear; Aurelian tried to burn both Columba and the bear alive, but the bear escaped and a "provincial rain put out the fire". Columba was condemned to death and beheaded, perhaps near a fountain named d'Azon. Her body was left on the ground after she was killed, but a man named Aubertus, who had prayed to her for the restoration of his sight, took care of her burial.

Columba was at one time venerated throughout France; as Rabenstein reported, "the historical monuments of Sens still testify to this devotion". A chapel was later built over her relics, and the Abbey of Sens, which at one time was a pilgrimage site in her honor, was eventually built there. She was the patron saint of Andorra and might have been the patron of Chevilly Church in Paris. She is invoked to bring about rain or avoid drought. She is portrayed "as a crowned maiden in chains", with a dog or bear on a chain, holding a book and a peacock's feather, with an angel on a funeral pyre, or beheaded. Her principal attribute is a she-bear. Her feast day is 31 December.

== Legacy ==
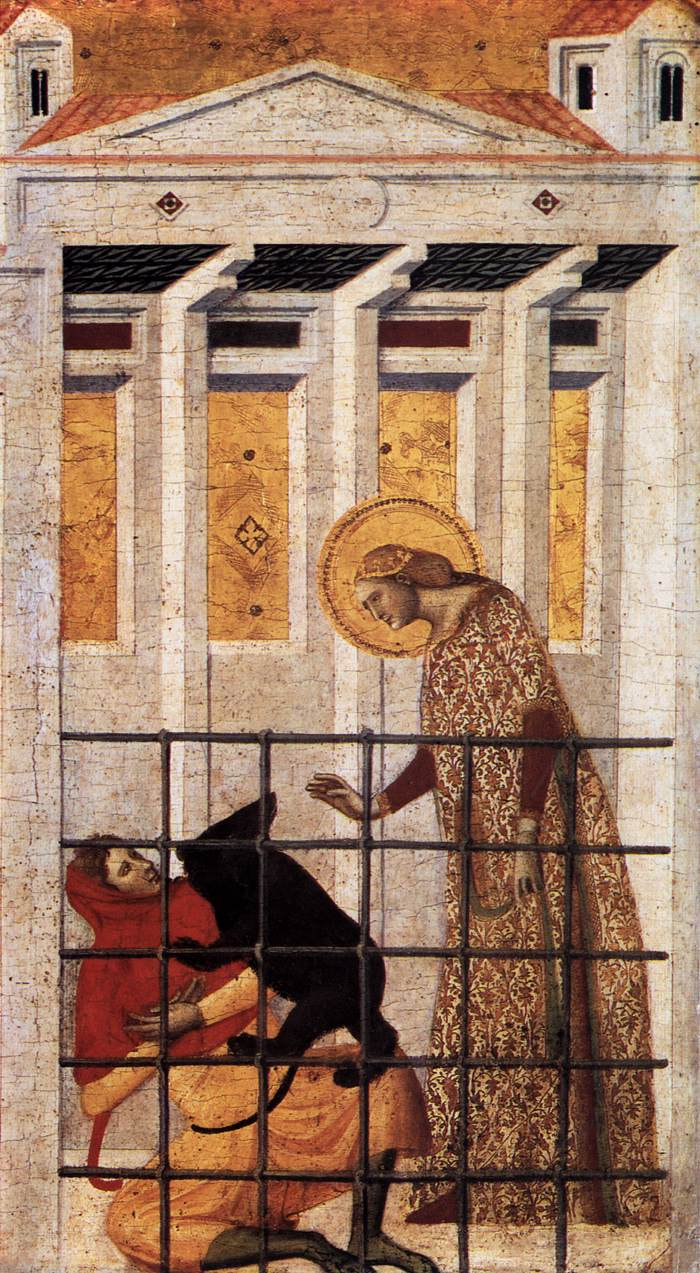
Part of the work "Stories from the life of St. Columba" by Giovanni Baronzio (c. 1345–1350)

Historian Allyson M. Poska stated that Columba's cult was "probably a combination of two virgin martyrs": Columba of Spain (d. 853) and Columba of Sens. Poska speculated that a Visigothic church dedicated to Columba in Bande (near the Portuguese border) could have indicated the spread of her devotion before the Muslims invaded Spain. The legend probably became conflated with Columba of Spain when settlers repopulated Galicia after the Muslims were expelled from the region.

In 1595, Italian poet and writer Lucrezia Marinella wrote a poem about Columba, "La Columba sacre". Writer Virginia Cox, who compared this poem with another poem and a prose piece Marinella wrote about Francis of Assisi, stated that Marinella's appeal to Columba's story was not devotional; rather, it was "in its intrinsic narrative interest and in the allegorical potential suggested by the heroine's name, 'Dove,' which recalls the traditional imagery of the Holy Spirit and makes her story not simply one of a single, heroic maiden but one of the triumph of Christianity as a whole". "La Columba sacre" was structured around the conflict between her and Aurelian and describes Aurelian's "initial, non-violent attempts to persuade Columba to renounce her faith" at the beginning of the poem, her beheading at the end, and her protection from rape by a "she-bear" and from being burned alive "by a heaven-sent downpour". Cox said the poem, while it closely resembled the secular epic poem, reworked the figure of the epic hero through Marinella's depiction of a role reversal between Columba, who is described as a warrior, and Aurelian. Cox stated that the poem Columba's defeat of Aurelian signified the defeat of pagan values by Christian values, as symbolized by the dove.

== Works cited ==
- Cox, Virginia. (2011). The Prodigious Muse: Women's Writing in Counter-Reformation Italy. Baltimore: Johns Hopkins University Press. ISBN 978-1-4214-0160-7. OCLC 794700422
- Poska, Allyson M. (2005). Women and Authority in Early Modern Spain: The Peasants of Galicia. Oxford, England: Oxford University Press. ISBN 978-0-19-151474-6. OCLC 253008869
