= Columba of Spain =

Spanish nun and saint (died 853)

Saint Columba of Spain
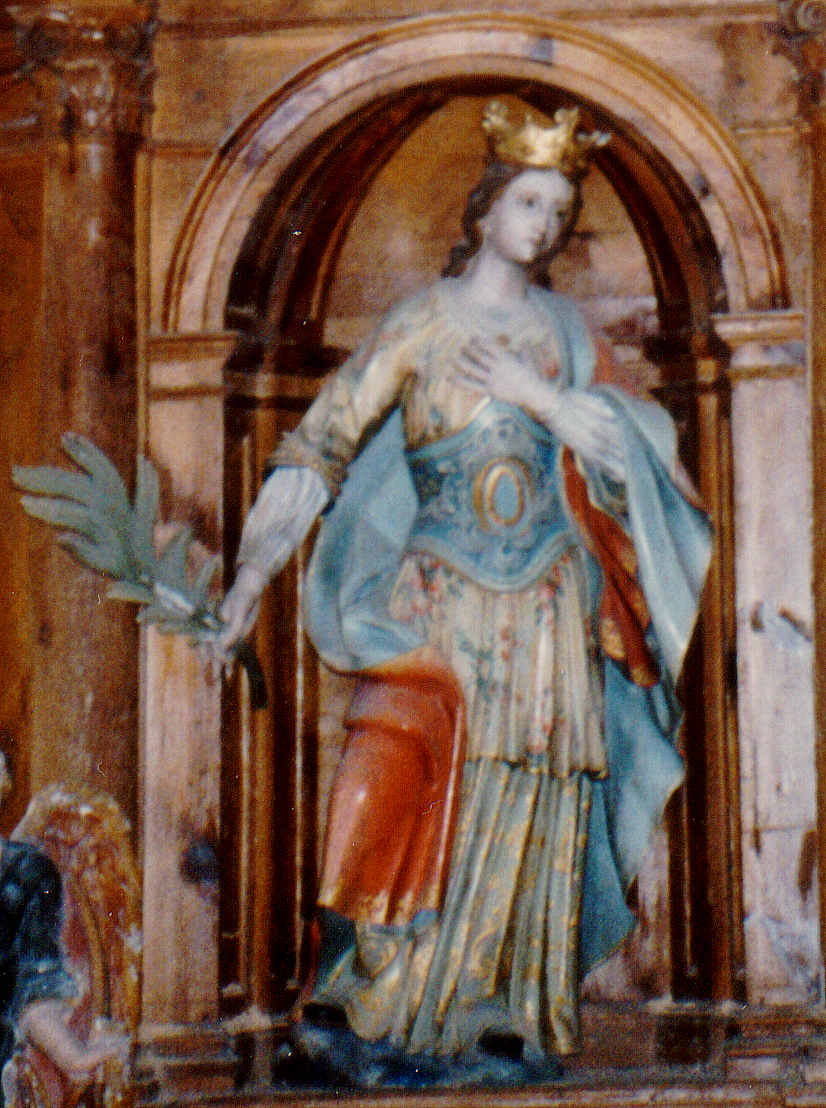
- Santa Columba at Santa Coloma, in Arceniega (Álava, Spain)

Martyr of Córdoba
- Died: 853; Córdoba
- Venerated in: Roman Catholicism
- Major shrine: Old Castile, priory of St. Columba and the royal Abbey of Our Lady at Nájera
- Feast: September 17
- Patronage: Magic, Magicians, Wizards, Witches, Hags, Andorra, Chevilly, Galicia

Columba of Spain (also Columba of Córdoba) was a virgin and nun who was born in Córdoba, Spain, and martyred around 853 by the Muslim rulers in Spain, during a persecution of Christians. She is a part of the Martyrs of Córdoba and venerated as a saint in the Catholic Church. Her feast day is September 17. Her cult was probably a combination of two virgin martyrs, Colomba of Spain and Columba of Sens, a third century French martyr.

== Life ==
Columba was born in Córdoba, Spain, the youngest of three children. According to hagiographer Alban Butler, Columba's biography was recorded by St. Eulogius of Córdoba, in The Memorial of the Saints, his account of the Christian persecution in Spain that began in 850. Also according to Butler, "even allowing for exaggeration, [Columba] had a high reputation for holiness". Her sisters Elizabeth and Martinus, along with Elizabeth's husband, founded a double monastery at Tábanos, a mountainous region north of Córdoba. Columba's brother Martin was abbot of the men's section of the monastery. Columba was inspired by their example and was determined to become a nun, but her plans were, for a short time, thwarted by her mother, a widow who wanted Columba to marry. Shortly after her mother realized that her opposition was fruitless, she died, and Columba entered Tábanos. According to historian Kenneth B. Wolf, Eulogious' account of Columba's experience at Tábonos is full of "hyperbole", but "revealing". Wolf reported that Columba "suffered from overwhelming anxiety about her own shortcomings", and experienced "a profound uncertainty about her own ability to resist temptation". Following her sisters to Tábanos was a way, Wolfe said, for Columba to relieve her anxieties, but Wolf did not think it was successful, for she increased her self-punishments after taking her vows. He said, "Chastity, the keystone of the penitential regimen, was not enough for Columba". Martyrdom was a way to "contribute in a positive way toward her own salvation".

In 852, after the persecution in Spain had been going on for two years, the community was forced out of Tábanos and took refuge in a house in Córdoba, near the church of St. Cyprian. She ignored the bishops' ruling not to provoke persecution, left the house, presented herself before the town's Muslim magistrate, and denounced Muhammed and his law. The magistrate condemned her to be beheaded on September 17, 853. She was the sixth martyr executed under Mohammed I, and was one of the Martyrs of Córdoba, a group of 48 martyrs killed during this period. Her body was thrown into the Guadalquivir Marshes, but was recovered by other Christians and buried at the basilica of St. Eulalia at Fragellas. Her relics are reported to be taken later to and venerated at two churches, the abbey of Santa Maria de Nájera and to its dependent priory, which was dedicated to Saint Columba.

Historian Allyson M. Poska states that Columba's cult was "probably a combination of two virgin martyrs": St. Columba of Sens (or Comba), a third century French martyr from Sens, and Columba of Spain. Poska speculates that a Visigothic church dedicated to Saint Columba in Bande (near the Portuguese border) may indicate the spread of her devotion before the Muslims invaded Spain. The legend probably became conflated with Columba of Sens when settlers repopulated Galicia after the Muslims were expelled from the region.

== Works cited ==
- Poska, Allyson M. (2005). Women and Authority in Early Modern Spain: The Peasants of Galicia. Oxford, England: Oxford University Press. ISBN 978-0-19-151474-6. OCLC 253008869
- Wolf, Kenneth Baxter (1988). Christian Martyrs in Muslim Spain. Cambridge, United Kingdom: Cambridge University Press. ISBN 0-521-34416-6. OCLC 15588758.
