= List of prime ministers of Italy =

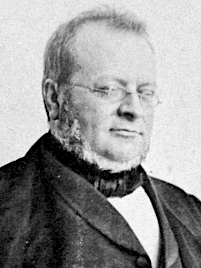
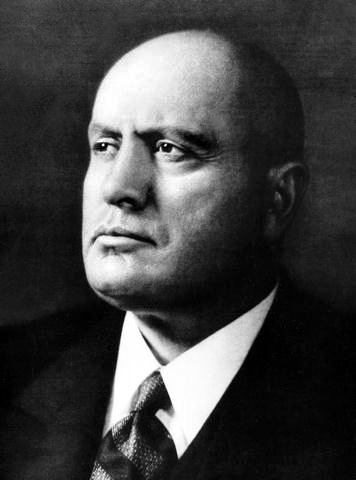
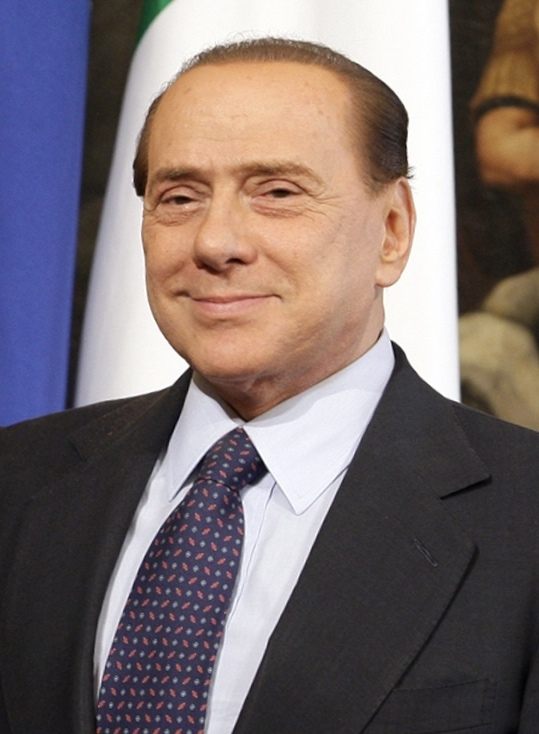
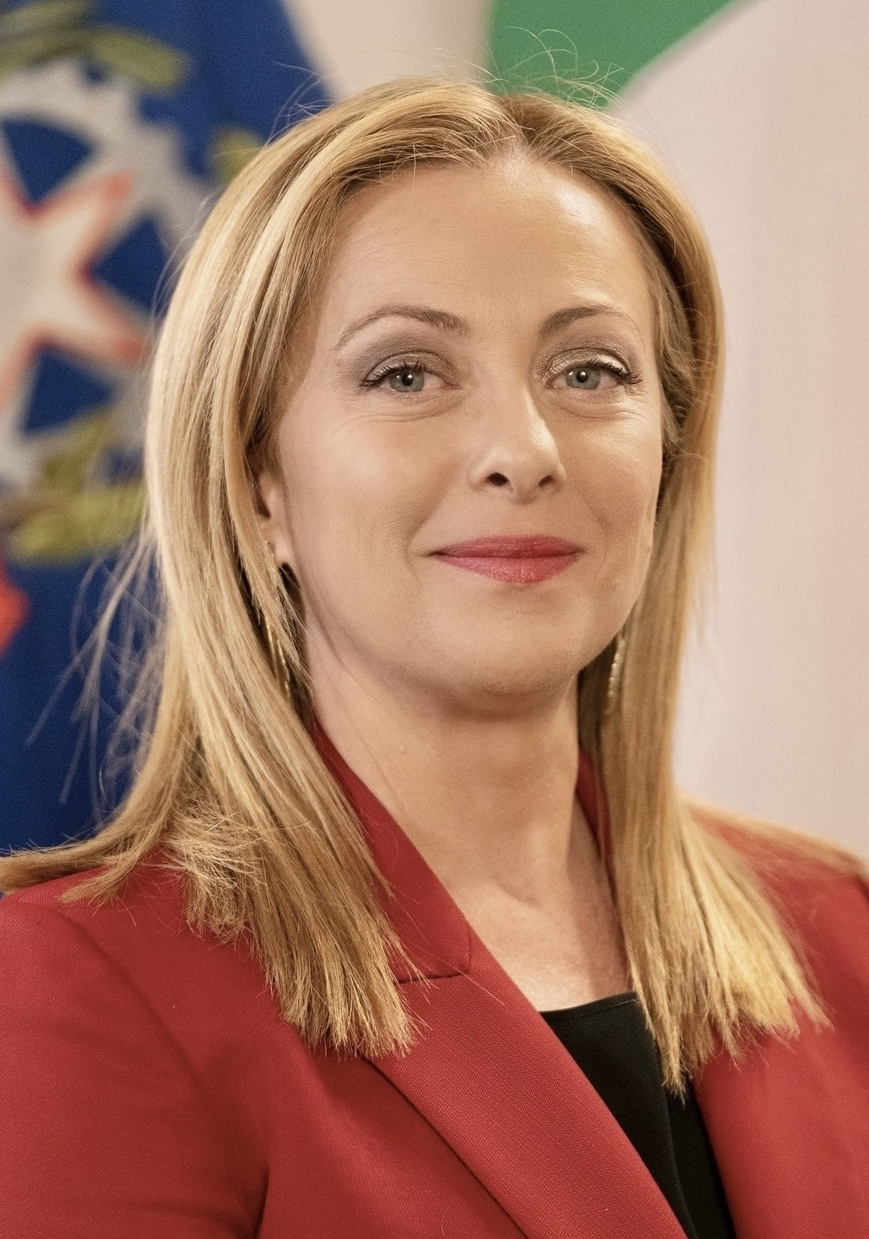
- Top left: Camillo Benso, Count of Cavour, was the first prime minister of the Kingdom of Italy.
- Top right: Benito Mussolini was the longest-serving prime minister in Italian history.
- Bottom left: Silvio Berlusconi was the longest-serving prime minister of the Italian Republic.
- Bottom right: Giorgia Meloni is the incumbent prime minister of Italy and the first woman to hold the office.

The prime minister of Italy is the head of the Council of Ministers, which holds effective executive power in the Italian government. The first officeholder was Camillo Benso, Count of Cavour, who was sworn in on 23 March 1861 after the unification of Italy. Cavour previously served as prime minister of the Kingdom of Sardinia, an office from which the Italian prime minister took most of its powers and duties. During the era of the monarchy of Italy under the House of Savoy, prime ministers were appointed by the King of Italy, as laid down in the Albertine Statute (1848). From 1925 until the fall of the Fascist regime in Italy in 1943, the Italian fascist dictator Benito Mussolini formally modified the office title to "Head of Government, Prime Minister, Secretary of State". From 1861 to 1946, 30 men served as prime ministers, leading 67 governments in total.

After the abolition of the Kingdom of Italy in 1946 and the proclamation of the Italian Republic, the office was established by Articles 92 through 96 of the Constitution of Italy (1948). Alcide De Gasperi is the only prime minister who held this position both in the Kingdom of Italy and in the Italian Republic; he was in office for over seven consecutive years between 1945 and 1953, more than any other democratically-elected prime minister. The prime minister is appointed by the president of the Italian Republic and must receive a confidence vote by both houses of the Italian Parliament: the Chamber of Deputies and the Senate of the Republic. From 1946 to 2022, in the first 76 years after the creation of the Italian Republic, 30 men served as prime ministers. The incumbent officeholder is Giorgia Meloni, who was appointed on 22 October 2022, becoming the first woman to hold this office.

The longest-serving prime minister in the history of Italy was Mussolini, who ruled the country as Fascist Italy from 1922 until 1943; the longest-serving prime minister of the Italian Republic was Silvio Berlusconi, who held the position for more than nine years between 1994 and 2011. The shortest-serving officeholder was Tommaso Tittoni, who served as prime minister for 16 days in 1905, while the shortest-serving prime minister of the Italian Republic was Fernando Tambroni, who governed for 123 days in 1960.

== Prime ministers of Italy ==
=== Prime ministers of the Kingdom of Italy (1861–1946) ===
Parties: (Note: Colours in the "Party" column indicate the party to which a prime minister belongs.)

1861–1912:
Historical Right
Historical Left
Military
1912–1922:
Liberal Party/Italian Liberal Party
Italian Radical Party
Italian Reformist Socialist Party

1922–1943:
National Fascist Party

1943–1946:
Labour Democratic Party
Action Party
Christian Democracy
Military

Coalitions: (Note: Colours in the "Composition" column indicate the governing coalition.)

1861–1912:
Rightist coalition
Centrist coalition
Leftist coalition

1912–1922:
Liberal coalition
Mixed coalition

1922–1943:
Fascist government
1943–1946:
Mixed coalition

Acronyms and abbreviations:
  - Right: Historical Right
  - Left: Historical Left
  - PR: Italian Radical Party
  - PL: Liberal Party
  - PRI: Italian Republican Party
  - PSRI: Italian Reformist Socialist Party
  - UECI: Italian Catholic Electoral Union
  - PLDI: Italian Democratic Liberal Party
  - PPI: Italian People's Party
  - DS: Social Democracy
  - PLI: Italian Liberal Party
  - PA: Agrarian Party
  - PNF: National Fascist Party
  - ANI: Italian Nationalist Association
  - PSI/PSIUP: Italian Socialist Party
  - PdA: Action Party
  - PCI: Italian Communist Party
  - DC: Christian Democracy
  - PDL: Labour Democratic Party

Symbols:
† Died in office

Prime Ministers of the Kingdom of Italy (1861–1946)
Portrait	Name (Birth–Death)	Term of office			Party	Government	Composition	Legislature (Election)	Monarch (Reign)	Ref.
Portrait	Name (Birth–Death)	Took office	Left office	Time in office	Party	Government	Composition	Legislature (Election)	Monarch (Reign)	Ref.
Camillo Benso, Count of Cavour	Count Camillo Benso di Cavour (1810–1861)	23 March 1861	6 June 1861†	75 days	Historical Right	Cavour IV (Note: After the Italian unification, the regnal number of King Victor Emmanuel, as well as the numbering for governments and legislatures, were taken in continuation with the corresponding numbers in the Kingdom of Sardinia.)	Trasformismo; Right	VIII (1861)	Victor Emmanuel II (1861–1878)	
Bettino Ricasoli	Baron Bettino Ricasoli (1809–1880)	12 June 1861	3 March 1862	264 days	Historical Right	Ricasoli I	Right	VIII (1861)	Victor Emmanuel II (1861–1878)	
Urbano Rattazzi	Urbano Rattazzi (1808–1873)	3 March 1862	8 December 1862	280 days	Historical Left	Rattazzi I	Right • Left	VIII (1861)	Victor Emmanuel II (1861–1878)	
Luigi Carlo Farini	Luigi Carlo Farini (1812–1866)	8 December 1862	24 March 1863	106 days	Historical Right	Farini	Right	VIII (1861)	Victor Emmanuel II (1861–1878)	
Marco Minghetti	Marco Minghetti (1818–1886)	24 March 1863	28 September 1864	1 year, 188 days	Historical Right	Minghetti I	Right	VIII (1861)	Victor Emmanuel II (1861–1878)	
Alfonso Ferrero La Marmora	General Alfonso Ferrero La Marmora (1804–1878)	28 September 1864	31 December 1865	1 year, 265 days	Military	La Marmora II	Right	VIII (1861)	Victor Emmanuel II (1861–1878)	
Alfonso Ferrero La Marmora	General Alfonso Ferrero La Marmora (1804–1878)	31 December 1865	20 June 1866	1 year, 265 days	Military	La Marmora III	Right	IX (1865)	Victor Emmanuel II (1861–1878)	
Bettino Ricasoli	Baron Bettino Ricasoli (1809–1880)	20 June 1866	10 April 1867	294 days	Historical Right	Ricasoli II	National unity government Right • Left	IX (1865)	Victor Emmanuel II (1861–1878)	
Urbano Rattazzi	Urbano Rattazzi (1808–1873)	10 April 1867	27 October 1867	200 days	Historical Left	Rattazzi II	Left	X (1867)	Victor Emmanuel II (1861–1878)	
Luigi Federico Menabrea	Count Luigi Federico Menabrea (1809–1896)	27 October 1867	5 January 1868	2 years, 48 days	Historical Right	Menabrea I	Right	X (1867)	Victor Emmanuel II (1861–1878)	
Luigi Federico Menabrea	Count Luigi Federico Menabrea (1809–1896)	5 January 1868	13 May 1869	2 years, 48 days	Historical Right	Menabrea II	Right	X (1867)	Victor Emmanuel II (1861–1878)	
Luigi Federico Menabrea	Count Luigi Federico Menabrea (1809–1896)	13 May 1869	14 December 1869	2 years, 48 days	Historical Right	Menabrea III	Right	X (1867)	Victor Emmanuel II (1861–1878)	
Giovanni Lanza	Giovanni Lanza (1810–1882)	14 December 1869	10 July 1873	3 years, 208 days	Historical Right	Lanza	Right	XI (1870)	Victor Emmanuel II (1861–1878)	
Marco Minghetti	Marco Minghetti (1818–1886)	10 July 1873	25 March 1876	2 years, 259 days	Historical Right	Minghetti II	Right	XII (1874)	Victor Emmanuel II (1861–1878)	
Agostino Depretis	Agostino Depretis (1813–1887)	25 March 1876	25 December 1877	1 year, 364 days	Historical Left	Depretis I	Left	XIII (1876)	Victor Emmanuel II (1861–1878)	
Agostino Depretis	Agostino Depretis (1813–1887)	26 December 1877	24 March 1878	1 year, 364 days	Historical Left	Depretis II	Left	XIII (1876)	Umberto I (1878–1900)	
Benedetto Cairoli	Benedetto Cairoli (1825–1889)	24 March 1878	19 December 1878	270 days	Historical Left	Cairoli I	Left	XIII (1876)	Umberto I (1878–1900)	
Agostino Depretis	Agostino Depretis (1813–1887)	19 December 1878	14 July 1879	214 days	Historical Left	Depretis III	Left	XIII (1876)	Umberto I (1878–1900)	
Benedetto Cairoli	Benedetto Cairoli (1825–1889)	14 July 1879	25 November 1879	1 year, 319 days	Historical Left	Cairoli II	Left	XIII (1876)	Umberto I (1878–1900)	
Benedetto Cairoli	Benedetto Cairoli (1825–1889)	25 November 1879	29 May 1881	1 year, 319 days	Historical Left	Cairoli III	Left	XIV (1880)	Umberto I (1878–1900)	
Agostino Depretis	Agostino Depretis (1813–1887)	29 May 1881	25 May 1883	6 years, 61 days	Historical Left	Depretis IV	Trasformismo; Left	XIV (1880)	Umberto I (1878–1900)	
Agostino Depretis	Agostino Depretis (1813–1887)	25 May 1883	30 March 1884	6 years, 61 days	Historical Left	Depretis V	Trasformismo; Left	XV (1882)	Umberto I (1878–1900)	
Agostino Depretis	Agostino Depretis (1813–1887)	30 March 1884	29 June 1885	6 years, 61 days	Historical Left	Depretis VI	Trasformismo; Left	XV (1882)	Umberto I (1878–1900)	
Agostino Depretis	Agostino Depretis (1813–1887)	29 June 1885	4 April 1887	6 years, 61 days	Historical Left	Depretis VII	Trasformismo; Left	XVI (1886)	Umberto I (1878–1900)	
Agostino Depretis	Agostino Depretis (1813–1887)	4 April 1887	29 July 1887†	6 years, 61 days	Historical Left	Depretis VIII	Trasformismo; Left	XVI (1886)	Umberto I (1878–1900)	
Francesco Crispi	Francesco Crispi (1818–1901)	29 July 1887	9 March 1889	3 years, 192 days	Historical Left	Crispi I	Trasformismo; Left	XVI (1886)	Umberto I (1878–1900)	
Francesco Crispi	Francesco Crispi (1818–1901)	9 March 1889	6 February 1891	3 years, 192 days	Historical Left	Crispi II	Trasformismo; Left	XVII (1890)	Umberto I (1878–1900)	
Antonio Starabba, Marchese di Rudinì	Marquess Antonio Starabba di Rudinì (1839–1908)	6 February 1891	15 May 1892	1 year, 99 days	Historical Right	Di Rudinì I	Right • Left	XVII (1890)	Umberto I (1878–1900)	
Giovanni Giolitti	Giovanni Giolitti (1842–1928)	15 May 1892	15 December 1893	1 year, 214 days	Historical Left	Giolitti I	Trasformismo; Left	XVIII (1892)	Umberto I (1878–1900)	
Francesco Crispi	Francesco Crispi (1818–1901)	15 December 1893	14 June 1894	2 years, 86 days	Historical Left	Crispi III	Trasformismo; Left • Right	XVIII (1892)	Umberto I (1878–1900)	
Francesco Crispi	Francesco Crispi (1818–1901)	14 June 1894	10 March 1896	2 years, 86 days	Historical Left	Crispi IV	Trasformismo; Left • Right	XIX (1895)	Umberto I (1878–1900)	
Antonio Starabba, Marchese di Rudinì	Marquess Antonio Starabba di Rudinì (1839–1908)	10 March 1896	11 July 1896	2 years, 111 days	Historical Right	Di Rudinì II	Right • Left	XIX (1895)	Umberto I (1878–1900)	
Antonio Starabba, Marchese di Rudinì	Marquess Antonio Starabba di Rudinì (1839–1908)	11 July 1896	14 December 1897	2 years, 111 days	Historical Right	Di Rudinì III	Right • Left	XIX (1895)	Umberto I (1878–1900)	
Antonio Starabba, Marchese di Rudinì	Marquess Antonio Starabba di Rudinì (1839–1908)	14 December 1897	1 June 1898	2 years, 111 days	Historical Right	Di Rudinì IV	Right • Left	XX (1897)	Umberto I (1878–1900)	
Antonio Starabba, Marchese di Rudinì	Marquess Antonio Starabba di Rudinì (1839–1908)	1 June 1898	29 June 1898	2 years, 111 days	Historical Right	Di Rudinì V	Right • Left	XX (1897)	Umberto I (1878–1900)	
Luigi Pelloux	General Luigi Pelloux (1839–1924)	29 June 1898	14 May 1899	1 year, 360 days	Military	Pelloux I	Left • Right	XX (1897)	Umberto I (1878–1900)	
Luigi Pelloux	General Luigi Pelloux (1839–1924)	14 May 1899	24 June 1900	1 year, 360 days	Military	Pelloux II	Right • Left	XX (1897)	Umberto I (1878–1900)	
Giuseppe Saracco	Giuseppe Saracco (1821–1907)	24 June 1900	15 February 1901	236 days	Historical Left	Saracco	Left • Right	XXI (1900)	Victor Emmanuel III (1900–1946)	
Giuseppe Zanardelli	Giuseppe Zanardelli (1826–1903)	15 February 1901	3 November 1903	2 years, 261 days	Historical Left	Zanardelli	Left • Right	XXI (1900)	Victor Emmanuel III (1900–1946)	
Giovanni Giolitti	Giovanni Giolitti (1842–1928)	3 November 1903	12 March 1905	1 year, 129 days	Historical Left	Giolitti II	Trasformismo; Left • Right	XXII (1904)	Victor Emmanuel III (1900–1946)	
Tommaso Tittoni	Tommaso Tittoni (1855–1931)	12 March 1905	28 March 1905	16 days	Historical Right	Tittoni	Left • Right	XXII (1904)	Victor Emmanuel III (1900–1946)	
Alessandro Fortis	Alessandro Fortis (1842–1909)	28 March 1905	24 December 1905	317 days	Historical Left	Fortis I	Left • Right	XXII (1904)	Victor Emmanuel III (1900–1946)	
Alessandro Fortis	Alessandro Fortis (1842–1909)	24 December 1905	8 February 1906	317 days	Historical Left	Fortis II	Left • Right	XXII (1904)	Victor Emmanuel III (1900–1946)	
Sidney Sonnino	Baron Sidney Sonnino (1847–1922)	8 February 1906	29 May 1906	110 days	Historical Right	Sonnino I	Right • Left • PR	XXII (1904)	Victor Emmanuel III (1900–1946)	
Giovanni Giolitti	Giovanni Giolitti (1842–1928)	29 May 1906	11 December 1909	3 years, 196 days	Historical Left	Giolitti III	Trasformismo; Left • Right	XXII (1904)	Victor Emmanuel III (1900–1946)	
Sidney Sonnino	Baron Sidney Sonnino (1847–1922)	11 December 1909	31 March 1910	110 days	Historical Right	Sonnino II	Right • Left	XXIII (1909)	Victor Emmanuel III (1900–1946)	
Luigi Luzzatti	Luigi Luzzatti (1841–1927)	31 March 1910	30 March 1911	364 days	Historical Right	Luzzatti	Right • PR • Left	XXIII (1909)	Victor Emmanuel III (1900–1946)	
Giovanni Giolitti	Giovanni Giolitti (1842–1928)	30 March 1911	21 March 1914	2 years, 356 days	Liberal Party	Giolitti IV	PL (Note: The result of a merge between the Left and Right in 1913) • PR	XXIII (1909)	Victor Emmanuel III (1900–1946)	
Antonio Salandra	Antonio Salandra (1853–1931)	21 March 1914	5 November 1914	2 years, 89 days	Liberal Party	Salandra I	PL	XXIV (1913)	Victor Emmanuel III (1900–1946)	
Antonio Salandra	Antonio Salandra (1853–1931)	5 November 1914	18 June 1916	2 years, 89 days	Liberal Party	Salandra II	PL • PRI	XXIV (1913)	Victor Emmanuel III (1900–1946)	
Paolo Boselli	Paolo Boselli (1838–1932)	18 June 1916	30 October 1917	1 year, 134 days	Liberal Party	Boselli	National unity government PL • PSRI • PR • UECI	XXIV (1913)	Victor Emmanuel III (1900–1946)	
Vittorio Emanuele Orlando	Vittorio Emanuele Orlando (1860–1952)	30 October 1917	23 June 1919	1 year, 236 days	Liberal Party	Orlando	PL • PR • PSRI • UECI •	XXIV (1913)	Victor Emmanuel III (1900–1946)	
Francesco Saverio Nitti	Francesco Saverio Nitti (1868–1953)	23 June 1919	21 May 1920	358 days	Italian Radical Party	Nitti I	PL • PLDI • PR • PSRI • PPI	XXIV (1913)	Victor Emmanuel III (1900–1946)	
Francesco Saverio Nitti	Francesco Saverio Nitti (1868–1953)	21 May 1920	15 June 1920	358 days	Italian Radical Party	Nitti II	PL • PR • PLDI • PPI	XXV (1919)	Victor Emmanuel III (1900–1946)	
Giovanni Giolitti	Giovanni Giolitti (1842–1928)	15 June 1920	4 July 1921	1 year, 19 days	Liberal Party	Giolitti V	PL • PPI • PR • PLDI • PSRI • DS	XXV (1919)	Victor Emmanuel III (1900–1946)	
Ivanoe Bonomi	Ivanoe Bonomi (1873–1951)	4 July 1921	26 February 1922	237 days	Italian Reformist Socialist Party	Bonomi I	PL • PPI • PSRI • PLDI • DS	XXVI (1921)	Victor Emmanuel III (1900–1946)	
Luigi Facta	Luigi Facta (1861–1930)	26 February 1922	1 August 1922	247 days	Liberal Party (Note: On 8 October 1922, the PL evolved into the PLI.)	Facta I	PL • PPI • PLDI • DS • PSRI • PA	XXVI (1921)	Victor Emmanuel III (1900–1946)	
Luigi Facta	Luigi Facta (1861–1930)	1 August 1922	31 October 1922	247 days	Liberal Party	Facta II	PLI • PPI • PLDI • DS • PSRI	XXVI (1921)	Victor Emmanuel III (1900–1946)	
Benito Mussolini	Duce Benito Mussolini (Note: On 24 December 1925, the office of "President of the Council of Ministers" (Prime Minister) was replaced by that of "Head of Government, Prime Minister, and Secretary of State". Mussolini remained in office with the new title until 25 July 1943.) (1883–1945)	31 October 1922	25 July 1943	20 years, 267 days	National Fascist Party	Mussolini	PNF • PPI (Note: Until 27 April 1923) • PLI (Note: Until 1 July 1924) • DS (Note: Until 5 February 1924) • ANI (Note: Merged into the PNF on 4 March 1923)	XXVI (1921)	Victor Emmanuel III (1900–1946)	
Benito Mussolini	Duce Benito Mussolini (1883–1945)	31 October 1922	25 July 1943	20 years, 267 days	National Fascist Party	Mussolini	PNF	XXVII (1924)	Victor Emmanuel III (1900–1946)	
Benito Mussolini	Duce Benito Mussolini (1883–1945)	31 October 1922	25 July 1943	20 years, 267 days	National Fascist Party	Mussolini	PNF	XXVIII (1929)	Victor Emmanuel III (1900–1946)	
Benito Mussolini	Duce Benito Mussolini (1883–1945)	31 October 1922	25 July 1943	20 years, 267 days	National Fascist Party	Mussolini	PNF	XXIX (1934)	Victor Emmanuel III (1900–1946)	
Benito Mussolini	Duce Benito Mussolini (1883–1945)	31 October 1922	25 July 1943	20 years, 267 days	National Fascist Party	Mussolini	PNF	XXX (no election)	Victor Emmanuel III (1900–1946)	
Pietro Badoglio	Marshal Pietro Badoglio (Note: With the title of "Head of Government, Prime Minister, and Secretary of State" until 3 June 1944, then "President of the Council of Ministers, Prime Minister, and Secretary of State") (1871–1956)	25 July 1943	24 April 1944	329 days	Military	Badoglio I	Transitional government Independents	Parliament abolished	Victor Emmanuel III (1900–1946)	
Pietro Badoglio	Marshal Pietro Badoglio (1871–1956)	24 April 1944	18 June 1944	329 days	Military	Badoglio II	CLN; PSIUP • PdA • PCI • PLI • DC • PDL	Parliament abolished	Victor Emmanuel III (1900–1946)	
Ivanoe Bonomi	Ivanoe Bonomi (1873–1951)	18 June 1944	12 December 1944	1 year, 3 days	Labour Democratic Party	Bonomi II	CLN; PDL • DC • PdA • PSIUP • PCI • PLI •	Parliament abolished	Victor Emmanuel III (1900–1946)	
Ivanoe Bonomi	Ivanoe Bonomi (1873–1951)	12 December 1944	21 June 1945	1 year, 3 days	Labour Democratic Party	Bonomi III	CLN; PDL • DC • PLI • PCI	Parliament abolished	Victor Emmanuel III (1900–1946)	
Ferruccio Parri	Ferruccio Parri (1890–1981)	21 June 1945	10 December 1945	172 days	Action Party	Parri	CLN; DC • PdA • PLI • PSIUP • PCI • PDL	National Council	Victor Emmanuel III (1900–1946)	
Alcide De Gasperi	Alcide De Gasperi (1881–1954)	10 December 1945	13 July 1946	212 days	Christian Democracy	De Gasperi I	CLN; DC • PSIUP • PdA • PLI • PDL • PCI	National Council	Umberto II (1946)	

=== Prime ministers of the Italian Republic (1946–present) ===
Parties: (Note: Colours in the "Party" column indicate the party to which a prime minister belongs.)

1946–1994:
Christian Democracy
Italian Republican Party
Italian Socialist Party
Independent

1994–present:
Forza Italia/The People of Freedom
Independent
Democrats of the Left
Democratic Party
Brothers of Italy

Coalitions: (Note: Colours in the "Composition" columns indicate the governing coalition.)

1946–1994:
Centrist coalition
Organic centre-left
Pentapartito/Quadripartito
Mixed coalition

1994–present:
Centre-right coalition
Centre-left coalition
Mixed coalition

Acronyms and abbreviations:
  - DC: Christian Democracy
  - PSI/PSIUP: Italian Socialist Party
  - PCI: Italian Communist Party
  - PRI: Italian Republican Party
  - PDL: Labour Democratic Party
  - PSLI/PSDI: Italian Democratic Socialist Party
  - PLI: Italian Liberal Party
  - PSU: Unified Socialist Party
  - PDS: Democratic Party of the Left
  - FdV: Federation of the Greens
  - FI: Forza Italia (1994), Forza Italia (2013)
  - LN: Northern League
  - AN: National Alliance
  - CCD: Christian Democratic Centre
  - UdC: Union of the Centre (1993)
  - PPI: Italian People's Party
  - RI: Italian Renewal
  - UD: Democratic Union
  - PRC: Communist Refoundation Party
  - DS: Democrats of the Left
  - SDI: Italian Democratic Socialists
  - PdCI: Party of Italian Communists
  - UDR: Democratic Union for the Republic
  - Dem: The Democrats
  - UDEUR: Union of Democrats for Europe
  - UDC: Union of the Centre (2002)
  - NPSI: New Italian Socialist Party
  - DL: The Daisy
  - RnP: Rose in the Fist
  - IdV: Italy of Values
  - PdL: The People of Freedom
  - PD: Democratic Party
  - FLI: Future and Freedom
  - NCD: New Centre-Right
  - SC: Civic Choice
  - PpI: Populars for Italy
  - RI: Italian Radicals
  - AP: Popular Alternative
  - CpE: Centrists for Europe
  - M5S: Five Star Movement
  - Lega: League
  - Art.1: Article One
  - IV: Italia Viva
  - IpF: Together for the Future
  - Az: Action
  - FdI: Brothers of Italy

Prime Ministers of the Italian Republic (1946–present)
Portrait	Name (Birth–Death)	Term of office			Party	Government	Composition	Legislature (Election)	President (Tenure)	Ref.
Portrait	Name (Birth–Death)	Took office	Left office	Time in office	Party	Government	Composition	Legislature (Election)	President (Tenure)	Ref.
Alcide De Gasperi	Alcide De Gasperi (1881–1954)	13 July 1946	2 February 1947	7 years, 35 days	Christian Democracy	De Gasperi II	CLN; DC • PSIUP • PCI • PRI	Constituent Assembly (1946)	Enrico De Nicola (1946–1948)	
Alcide De Gasperi	Alcide De Gasperi (1881–1954)	2 February 1947	1 June 1947	7 years, 35 days	Christian Democracy	De Gasperi III	CLN; DC • PSI • PCI • PDL	Constituent Assembly (1946)	Enrico De Nicola (1946–1948)	
Alcide De Gasperi	Alcide De Gasperi (1881–1954)	1 June 1947	24 May 1948	7 years, 35 days	Christian Democracy	De Gasperi IV	Centrism; DC • PSLI • PLI • PRI	Constituent Assembly (1946)	Enrico De Nicola (1946–1948)	
Alcide De Gasperi	Alcide De Gasperi (1881–1954)	24 May 1948	27 January 1950	7 years, 35 days	Christian Democracy	De Gasperi V	Centrism; DC • PSLI • PLI • PRI	I (1948)	Luigi Einaudi (1948–1955)	
Alcide De Gasperi	Alcide De Gasperi (1881–1954)	27 January 1950	26 July 1951	7 years, 35 days	Christian Democracy	De Gasperi VI	Centrism; DC • PSLI • PRI	I (1948)	Luigi Einaudi (1948–1955)	
Alcide De Gasperi	Alcide De Gasperi (1881–1954)	26 July 1951	16 July 1953	7 years, 35 days	Christian Democracy	De Gasperi VII	Centrism; DC • PRI	I (1948)	Luigi Einaudi (1948–1955)	
Alcide De Gasperi	Alcide De Gasperi (1881–1954)	16 July 1953	17 August 1953	7 years, 35 days	Christian Democracy	De Gasperi VIII (Note: The government did not receive the confidence of Parliament.)	DC	II (1953)	Luigi Einaudi (1948–1955)	
Giuseppe Pella	Giuseppe Pella (1902–1981)	17 August 1953	19 January 1954	155 days	Christian Democracy	Pella	DC	II (1953)	Luigi Einaudi (1948–1955)	
Amintore Fanfani	Amintore Fanfani (1908–1999)	19 January 1954	10 February 1954	22 days	Christian Democracy	Fanfani I	DC	II (1953)	Luigi Einaudi (1948–1955)	
Mario Scelba	Mario Scelba (1901–1991)	10 February 1954	6 July 1955	1 year, 146 days	Christian Democracy	Scelba	Centrism; DC • PSDI • PLI	II (1953)	Luigi Einaudi (1948–1955)	
Antonio Segni	Antonio Segni (1891–1972)	6 July 1955	20 May 1957	1 year, 318 days	Christian Democracy	Segni I	Centrism; DC • PSDI • PLI	II (1953)	Giovanni Gronchi (1955–1962)	
Adone Zoli	Adone Zoli (1887–1960)	20 May 1957	2 July 1958	1 year, 43 days	Christian Democracy	Zoli	DC	II (1953)	Giovanni Gronchi (1955–1962)	
Amintore Fanfani	Amintore Fanfani (1908–1999)	2 July 1958	16 February 1959	229 days	Christian Democracy	Fanfani II	Centrism; DC • PSDI	III (1958)	Giovanni Gronchi (1955–1962)	
Antonio Segni	Antonio Segni (1891–1972)	16 February 1959	26 March 1960	1 year, 39 days	Christian Democracy	Segni II	DC	III (1958)	Giovanni Gronchi (1955–1962)	
Fernando Tambroni	Fernando Tambroni (1901–1963)	26 March 1960	27 July 1960	123 days	Christian Democracy	Tambroni	DC	III (1958)	Giovanni Gronchi (1955–1962)	
Amintore Fanfani	Amintore Fanfani (1908–1999)	27 July 1960	22 February 1962	2 years, 330 days	Christian Democracy	Fanfani III	DC	III (1958)	Giovanni Gronchi (1955–1962)	
Amintore Fanfani	Amintore Fanfani (1908–1999)	22 February 1962	22 June 1963	2 years, 330 days	Christian Democracy	Fanfani IV	DC • PSDI • PRI	III (1958)	Antonio Segni (1962–1964)	
Giovanni Leone	Giovanni Leone (1908–2001)	22 June 1963	5 December 1963	166 days	Christian Democracy	Leone I	DC	IV (1963)	Antonio Segni (1962–1964)	
Aldo Moro	Aldo Moro (1916–1978)	5 December 1963	23 July 1964	4 years, 203 days	Christian Democracy	Moro I	Organic centre-left DC • PSI • PSDI • PRI	IV (1963)	Antonio Segni (1962–1964)	
Aldo Moro	Aldo Moro (1916–1978)	23 July 1964	24 February 1966	4 years, 203 days	Christian Democracy	Moro II	Organic centre-left DC • PSI • PSDI • PRI	IV (1963)	Giuseppe Saragat (1964–1971)	
Aldo Moro	Aldo Moro (1916–1978)	24 February 1966	25 June 1968	4 years, 203 days	Christian Democracy	Moro III	Organic centre-left DC • PSI • PSDI • PRI	IV (1963)	Giuseppe Saragat (1964–1971)	
Giovanni Leone	Giovanni Leone (1908–2001)	25 June 1968	13 December 1968	171 days	Christian Democracy	Leone II	DC	V (1968)	Giuseppe Saragat (1964–1971)	
Mariano Rumor	Mariano Rumor (1915–1990)	13 December 1968	6 August 1969	1 year, 236 days	Christian Democracy	Rumor I	Organic centre-left DC • PSU • PRI	V (1968)	Giuseppe Saragat (1964–1971)	
Mariano Rumor	Mariano Rumor (1915–1990)	6 August 1969	28 March 1970	1 year, 236 days	Christian Democracy	Rumor II	DC	V (1968)	Giuseppe Saragat (1964–1971)	
Mariano Rumor	Mariano Rumor (1915–1990)	28 March 1970	6 August 1970	1 year, 236 days	Christian Democracy	Rumor III	Organic centre-left DC • PSI • PSDI • PRI	V (1968)	Giuseppe Saragat (1964–1971)	
Emilio Colombo	Emilio Colombo (1920–2013)	6 August 1970	18 February 1972	1 year, 196 days	Christian Democracy	Colombo	Organic centre-left DC • PSI • PSDI • PRI	V (1968)	Giuseppe Saragat (1964–1971)	
Giulio Andreotti	Giulio Andreotti (1919–2013)	18 February 1972	26 June 1972	1 year, 140 days	Christian Democracy	Andreotti I	DC	V (1968)	Giovanni Leone (1971–1978)	
Giulio Andreotti	Giulio Andreotti (1919–2013)	26 June 1972	8 July 1973	1 year, 140 days	Christian Democracy	Andreotti II	DC • PSDI • PLI	VI (1972)	Giovanni Leone (1971–1978)	
Mariano Rumor	Mariano Rumor (1915–1990)	8 July 1973	15 March 1974	1 year, 138 days	Christian Democracy	Rumor IV	Organic centre-left DC • PSI • PSDI • PRI	VI (1972)	Giovanni Leone (1971–1978)	
Mariano Rumor	Mariano Rumor (1915–1990)	15 March 1974	23 November 1974	1 year, 138 days	Christian Democracy	Rumor V	Organic centre-left DC • PSI • PSDI	VI (1972)	Giovanni Leone (1971–1978)	
Aldo Moro	Aldo Moro (1916–1978)	23 November 1974	12 February 1976	1 year, 250 days	Christian Democracy	Moro IV	DC • PRI	VI (1972)	Giovanni Leone (1971–1978)	
Aldo Moro	Aldo Moro (1916–1978)	12 February 1976	30 July 1976	1 year, 250 days	Christian Democracy	Moro V	DC	VI (1972)	Giovanni Leone (1971–1978)	
Giulio Andreotti	Giulio Andreotti (1919–2013)	30 July 1976	13 March 1978	3 years, 6 days	Christian Democracy	Andreotti III	Historic Compromise (Note: The two Historic Compromise governments were known as the "government of non no-confidence" and the "government of national solidarity".); DC	VII (1976)	Giovanni Leone (1971–1978)	
Giulio Andreotti	Giulio Andreotti (1919–2013)	13 March 1978	21 March 1979	3 years, 6 days	Christian Democracy	Andreotti IV	Historic Compromise; DC	VII (1976)	Sandro Pertini (1978–1985)	
Giulio Andreotti	Giulio Andreotti (1919–2013)	21 March 1979	5 August 1979	3 years, 6 days	Christian Democracy	Andreotti V	DC • PSDI • PRI	VII (1976)	Sandro Pertini (1978–1985)	
Francesco Cossiga	Francesco Cossiga (1928–2010)	5 August 1979	4 April 1980	1 year, 74 days	Christian Democracy	Cossiga I	DC • PSDI • PLI	VIII (1979)	Sandro Pertini (1978–1985)	
Francesco Cossiga	Francesco Cossiga (1928–2010)	4 April 1980	18 October 1980	1 year, 74 days	Christian Democracy	Cossiga II	Organic centre-left DC • PSI • PRI	VIII (1979)	Sandro Pertini (1978–1985)	
Arnaldo Forlani	Arnaldo Forlani (1925–2023)	18 October 1980	28 June 1981	253 days	Christian Democracy	Forlani	Organic centre-left DC • PSI • PSDI • PRI	VIII (1979)	Sandro Pertini (1978–1985)	
Giovanni Spadolini	Giovanni Spadolini (1925–1994)	28 June 1981	23 August 1982	1 year, 156 days	Italian Republican Party	Spadolini I	Pentapartito; DC • PSI • PSDI • PRI • PLI	VIII (1979)	Sandro Pertini (1978–1985)	
Giovanni Spadolini	Giovanni Spadolini (1925–1994)	23 August 1982	1 December 1982	1 year, 156 days	Italian Republican Party	Spadolini II	Pentapartito; DC • PSI • PSDI • PRI • PLI	VIII (1979)	Sandro Pertini (1978–1985)	
Amintore Fanfani	Amintore Fanfani (1908–1999)	1 December 1982	4 August 1983	246 days	Christian Democracy	Fanfani V	DC • PSI • PSDI • PLI	VIII (1979)	Sandro Pertini (1978–1985)	
Bettino Craxi	Bettino Craxi (1934–2000)	4 August 1983	1 August 1986	3 years, 257 days	Italian Socialist Party	Craxi I	Pentapartito; DC • PSI • PRI • PSDI • PLI	IX (1983)	Sandro Pertini (1978–1985)	
Bettino Craxi	Bettino Craxi (1934–2000)	1 August 1986	18 April 1987	3 years, 257 days	Italian Socialist Party	Craxi II	Pentapartito; DC • PSI • PRI • PSDI • PLI	IX (1983)	Francesco Cossiga (1985–1992)	
Amintore Fanfani	Amintore Fanfani (1908–1999)	18 April 1987	29 July 1987	102 days	Christian Democracy	Fanfani VI	DC	IX (1983)	Francesco Cossiga (1985–1992)	
Giovanni Goria	Giovanni Goria (1943–1994)	29 July 1987	13 April 1988	259 days	Christian Democracy	Goria	Pentapartito; DC • PSI • PRI • PSDI • PLI	X (1987)	Francesco Cossiga (1985–1992)	
Ciriaco De Mita	Ciriaco De Mita (1928–2022)	13 April 1988	23 July 1989	1 year, 101 days	Christian Democracy	De Mita	Pentapartito; DC • PSI • PRI • PSDI • PLI	X (1987)	Francesco Cossiga (1985–1992)	
Giulio Andreotti	Giulio Andreotti (1919–2013)	23 July 1989	13 April 1991	2 years, 341 days	Christian Democracy	Andreotti VI	Pentapartito; DC • PSI • PRI • PSDI • PLI	X (1987)	Francesco Cossiga (1985–1992)	
Giulio Andreotti	Giulio Andreotti (1919–2013)	13 April 1991	28 June 1992	2 years, 341 days	Christian Democracy	Andreotti VII	Quadripartito; DC • PSI • PSDI • PLI	X (1987)	Francesco Cossiga (1985–1992)	
Giuliano Amato	Giuliano Amato (born 1938)	28 June 1992	28 April 1993	304 days	Italian Socialist Party	Amato I	Quadripartito; DC • PSI • PLI • PSDI	XI (1992)	Oscar Luigi Scalfaro (1992–1999)	
Carlo Azeglio Ciampi	Carlo Azeglio Ciampi (1920–2016)	28 April 1993	11 May 1994	1 year, 13 days	Independent	Ciampi	DC • PSI • PDS (Note: Until 4 May 1993) • PLI • PRI • PSDI • FdV	XI (1992)	Oscar Luigi Scalfaro (1992–1999)	
Silvio Berlusconi	Silvio Berlusconi (1936–2023)	11 May 1994	17 January 1995	251 days	Forza Italia	Berlusconi I	PdL–PBG; FI • LN • AN • CCD • UdC	XII (1994)	Oscar Luigi Scalfaro (1992–1999)	
Lamberto Dini	Lamberto Dini (born 1931)	17 January 1995	18 May 1996	1 year, 122 days	Independent	Dini	Technocratic government (Confidence & supply: PDS, FI, LN, PPI, CCD, FL, FdV, PS, LR, AD, SI)	XII (1994)	Oscar Luigi Scalfaro (1992–1999)	
Romano Prodi	Romano Prodi (born 1939)	18 May 1996	21 October 1998	2 years, 156 days	Independent (Note: Within The Olive Tree (Ulivo) coalition)	Prodi I	The Olive Tree; PDS • PPI • RI • FdV • UD	XIII (1996)	Oscar Luigi Scalfaro (1992–1999)	
Massimo D'Alema	Massimo D'Alema (born 1949)	21 October 1998	22 December 1999	1 year, 188 days	Democrats of the Left	D'Alema I	The Olive Tree; DS • PPI • RI • SDI (Note: Until December 1999) • FdV • PdCI • UDR (Note: Until February 1999) • UDEUR (Note: From February 1999) • Dem	XIII (1996)	Oscar Luigi Scalfaro (1992–1999)	
Massimo D'Alema	Massimo D'Alema (born 1949)	22 December 1999	26 April 2000	1 year, 188 days	Democrats of the Left	D'Alema II	The Olive Tree; DS • PPI • RI • SDI • FdV • PdCI • UDR • UDEUR • Dem	XIII (1996)	Carlo Azeglio Ciampi (1999–2006)	
Giuliano Amato	Giuliano Amato (born 1938)	26 April 2000	11 June 2001	1 year, 46 days	Independent	Amato II	The Olive Tree; DS • PPI • Dem • FdV • PdCI • UDEUR • RI • SDI	XIII (1996)	Carlo Azeglio Ciampi (1999–2006)	
Silvio Berlusconi	Silvio Berlusconi (1936–2023)	11 June 2001	23 April 2005	4 years, 340 days	Forza Italia	Berlusconi II	House of Freedoms; FI • AN • LN • UDC • NPSI • PRI	XIV (2001)	Carlo Azeglio Ciampi (1999–2006)	
Silvio Berlusconi	Silvio Berlusconi (1936–2023)	23 April 2005	17 May 2006	4 years, 340 days	Forza Italia	Berlusconi III	House of Freedoms; FI • AN • LN • UDC • NPSI • PRI	XIV (2001)	Carlo Azeglio Ciampi (1999–2006)	
Romano Prodi	Romano Prodi (born 1939)	17 May 2006	8 May 2008	1 year, 357 days	Independent (Note: The DS and DL parties merged to establish the PD on 14 October 2007. Prodi was elected president of the PD by the new party's National Assembly.)	Prodi II	The Union; DS • DL • PRC • RnP • PdCI • IdV • FdV • UDEUR	XV (2006)	Giorgio Napolitano (2006–2015)	
Silvio Berlusconi	Silvio Berlusconi (1936–2023)	8 May 2008	16 November 2011	3 years, 192 days	The People of Freedom	Berlusconi IV	PdL • LN	XVI (2008)	Giorgio Napolitano (2006–2015)	
Mario Monti	Mario Monti (born 1943)	16 November 2011	28 April 2013	1 year, 163 days	Independent (Note: Founded the SC party in January 2013)	Monti	Technocratic government (Confidence & supply: PdL, PD, UdC, FLI, PeT, ApI, PLI)	XVI (2008)	Giorgio Napolitano (2006–2015)	
Enrico Letta	Enrico Letta (born 1966)	28 April 2013	22 February 2014	300 days	Democratic Party	Letta	PD • PdL (Note: Until November 2013) • SC • UDC • RI • NCD (Note: From November 2013) • PpI	XVII (2013)	Giorgio Napolitano (2006–2015)	
Matteo Renzi	Matteo Renzi (born 1975)	22 February 2014	12 December 2016	2 years, 294 days	Democratic Party	Renzi	PD (Note: In January 2014, although the November 2013-refounded FI (the successor of the PdL) was not part of the government, Renzi and Berlusconi signed the Nazareno Pact, a political agreement for electoral (Italicum) and constitutional reforms (2016 Italian constitutional referendum). The agreement formally ended in February 2015 following the election of Mattarella as president of Italy. The NCD party was formed in disagreement with the PdL's decision to exit from the governing majority in November 2013.) • NCD • SC • UDC	XVII (2013)	Sergio Mattarella (2015–present)	
Paolo Gentiloni	Paolo Gentiloni (born 1954)	12 December 2016	1 June 2018	1 year, 171 days	Democratic Party	Gentiloni	PD • NCD/AP • CpE	XVII (2013)	Sergio Mattarella (2015–present)	
Giuseppe Conte	Giuseppe Conte (born 1964)	1 June 2018	5 September 2019	2 years, 257 days	Independent (Note: Close to the M5S, of which he became president in August 2021)	Conte I	M5S • Lega	XVIII (2018)	Sergio Mattarella (2015–present)	
Giuseppe Conte	Giuseppe Conte (born 1964)	5 September 2019	13 February 2021	2 years, 257 days	Independent	Conte II	M5S • PD • Art.1 • IV (Note: From September 2019 to January 2021)	XVIII (2018)	Sergio Mattarella (2015–present)	
Mario Draghi	Mario Draghi (born 1947)	13 February 2021	22 October 2022	1 year, 251 days	Independent	Draghi	M5S • Lega • PD • FI • IpF (Note: From June 2022) • IV • Art.1 • Az (Note: From July 2022)	XVIII (2018)	Sergio Mattarella (2015–present)	
Giorgia Meloni	Giorgia Meloni (born 1977)	22 October 2022	Incumbent	3 years, 324 days	Brothers of Italy	Meloni	FdI • Lega • FI	XIX (2022)	Sergio Mattarella (2015–present)	

== See also ==
- List of prime ministers of Italy by time in office
- Deputy Prime Minister of Italy
- Lists of office-holders
- Politics of Italy

== Bibliography ==
- Guglielmotti, Umberto, ed. (1966). I presidenti del Consiglio dei Ministri dell'Unita' d'Italia ad oggi, Volume 3 (in Italian). CEN.
- Viviani, Maria Paola, ed. (1970). La presidenza del Consiglio dei ministri in alcuni stati dell'Europa occidentale ed in Italia (in Italian). Giuffrè.
- Rotelli, Ettore, ed. (1972). La Presidenza Del Consiglio Dei Ministri: Il Problema Del Coordinamento Dell'amministrazione Centrale in Italia, (1848–1948) (in Italian). Giuffrè.
- Marzo, Corradino; Amodio, Vito Domenico, eds. (2014). I governi della Repubblica. Storia dei Presidenti del Consiglio, Volume 1 (in Italian). Lupo. ISBN 978-8866671893.
