= Pietro Lanza di Scalea =

Italian noble and politician (1863–1938)

Prince Pietro Lanza di Scalea
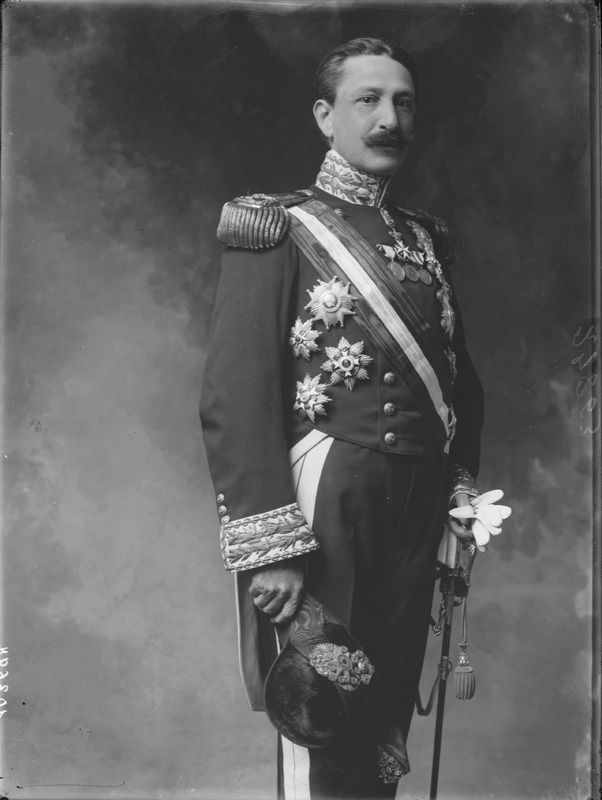

Minister of the Colonies
- In office 1 July 1924 – 6 November 1926
- Prime Minister: Benito Mussolini
- Preceded by: Luigi Federzoni
- Succeeded by: Luigi Federzoni

Minister of War
- In office 26 February 1922 – 1 August 1922
- Prime Minister: Luigi Facta
- Preceded by: Luigi Gasparotto
- Succeeded by: Marcello Soleri

Member of the Chamber of Deputies
- In office 5 April 1897 – 21 January 1929

Senator of the Kingdom of Italy
- In office 21 January 1929 – 19 January 1934
- Appointed by: Victor Emmanuel III

Personal details
- Born: 20 October 1863 Palermo, Kingdom of Italy
- Died: 29 May 1938 (aged 74) Rome, Kingdom of Italy
- Party: National Fascist Party
- Other political affiliations: Agrarian Party (1920–1924)
- Spouse: Dorotea Fardella
- Children: 6
- Parents: Prince of Scalea Francesco (father); Rosa Mastrogiovanni Tasca (mother)

Pietro Lanza Branciforte Mastrogiovanni Tasca, Prince Lanza of Scalea (1863–1938) was an Italian noble and politician. He served as the minister of war in 1922 and as the minister of the colonies between 1924 and 1926. He was a long-term member of the Italian Parliament.

== Early life ==
Lanza was born in Palermo on 20 October 1863. His parents were Prince of Scalea Francesco and Rosa Mastrogiovanni Tasca from the family of the counts of Almerita. He had five siblings. Lanza received a degree in law.

== Career ==
In 1897 Lanza was elected to the Parliament where he served for seven terms until 1924. He was the state secretary at the Ministry of Foreign Affairs between 11 February 1906 to March 1914 with some interruptions. In 1920 he founded the short-lived Agrarian Party. He was appointed minister of war to the cabinet led by Prime Minister Luigi Facta on 26 February 1922 and was in office until 1 August 1922. Lanza was named as the minister of the colonies in the cabinet of Benito Mussolini on 1 July 1924, succeeding Luigi Federzoni in the post. During the visit of Lanza to Libya rebels killed and wounded more than 100 Italians at Bir Tarsin. Lanza's term as minister of the colonies ended on 6 November 1926. In 1929 he was elected to the Italian Senate.

In addition to his political offices Lanza was a member of the Sicilian Society for Homeland History, a member of the Italian Geographic Society (1909), president of the Italian Geographic Society (1926–1928) and a member of the Roman Society of Homeland History (8 July 1936). He also headed the Italian Committee for Czechoslovak Independence.

== Personal life and death ==
Lanza was married to Dorotea Fardella, baroness of Moxharta, and they had six children. He died in Rome on 29 May 1938.

=== Awards ===
Lanza was the recipient of the following:

- Commander of the Order of the Crown of Italy (7December 1917)
- Grand Officer of the Order of the Crown of Italy (26 November 1922)
- Grand Cordon of the Order of Saints Maurice and Lazarus (11 June 1922)
- Bailiff of the Sovereign Military Order of Malta

Italian nobility
| Preceded by Francesco Lanza Spinelli di Scalea | Prince Lanza of Scalea; 1919–1938 | Succeeded by Francesco Lanza Branciforte Fardella |
