= First Facta government =

57th Government of Kingdom of Italy

Facta I government
- 57th Cabinet of Italy

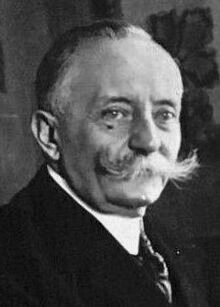
- Date formed: 26 February 1922
- Date dissolved: 1 August 1922

People and organisations
- Head of state: Victor Emmanuel III
- Head of government: Luigi Facta
- Total no. of members: 15
- Member party: PPI, PL, PLD, DS, PSRI, PA

History
- Predecessor: Bonomi I Cabinet
- Successor: Facta II Cabinet

The Facta I government of Italy held office from 26 February 1922 until 1 August 1922, a total of 237 days, or 7 months and 22 days. It replaced the first cabinet of Ivanoe Bonomi which had not been given a vote of confidence by the Chamber of Deputies on 17 February.

== Government parties ==
The government was composed by the following parties:

Party	Ideology	Leader
Italian People's Party	Christian democracy	Luigi Sturzo
Liberal Party	Liberalism	Giovanni Giolitti
Democratic Liberal Party	Liberalism	Francesco Saverio Nitti
Social Democracy	Social liberalism	Giovanni Antonio Colonna
Italian Reformist Socialist Party	Social democracy	Ivanoe Bonomi
Agrarian Party	Agrarianism	Pietro Lanza di Scalea

== Composition ==
The cabinet members were as follows:

Office	Name	Party	Term
Prime Minister	Luigi Facta	Liberal Party	(1922–1922)
Minister of the Interior	Luigi Facta	Liberal Party	(1922–1922)
Minister of Foreign Affairs	Carlo Schanzer	Democratic Liberal Party	(1922–1922)
Minister of Justice and Worship Affairs	Luigi Rossi	Democratic Liberal Party	(1922–1922)
Minister of Finance	Giovanni Battista Bertone	Italian People's Party	(1922–1922)
Minister of Treasury	Camillo Peano	Democratic Liberal Party	(1922–1922)
Minister of War	Pietro Lanza di Scalea	Agrarian Party	(1922–1922)
Minister of the Navy	Roberto De Vito	Social Democracy	(1922–1922)
Minister of Industry and Commerce	Teofilo Rossi	Liberal Party	(1922–1922)
Minister of Public Works	Vincenzo Riccio	Liberal Party	(1922–1922)
Minister of Agriculture	Giovanni Bertini	Italian People's Party	(1922–1922)
Minister of Public Education	Antonio Anile	Italian People's Party	(1922–1922)
Minister of Labour and Social Security	Arnaldo Dello Sbarba	Italian Reformist Socialist Party	(1922–1922)
Minister of Post and Telegraphs	Giovanni Antonio Colonna	Social Democracy	(1922–1922)
Minister of Post and Telegraphs	Luigi Fulci	Social Democracy	(1922–1922)
Minister of the Colonies	Giovanni Amendola	Democratic Liberal Party	(1922–1922)
Minister for the Lands freed by the Enemy	Luigi Facta	Liberal Party	(1922–1922)
Minister for the Lands freed by the Enemy	Maggiorino Ferraris	Liberal Party	(1922–1922)
