= Peano (surname) =

Peano is an Italian surname and is mostly used in the Piedmont region. Notable people with the surname include:

- Camillo Peano (1863–1930), Italian jurist and politician
- Giuseppe Peano (1858–1932), Italian mathematician and glottologist
- Marcos Peano (born 1998), Argentine football player
