= List of prime ministers of Italy by time in office =

Since 1861, there have been 60 people sworn into office as prime minister of Italy: 30 during the monarchic period and 31 during the republican period, with Alcide De Gasperi having served during both. In 2022 Giorgia Meloni became the first woman to hold the office.

== Notable lengths ==
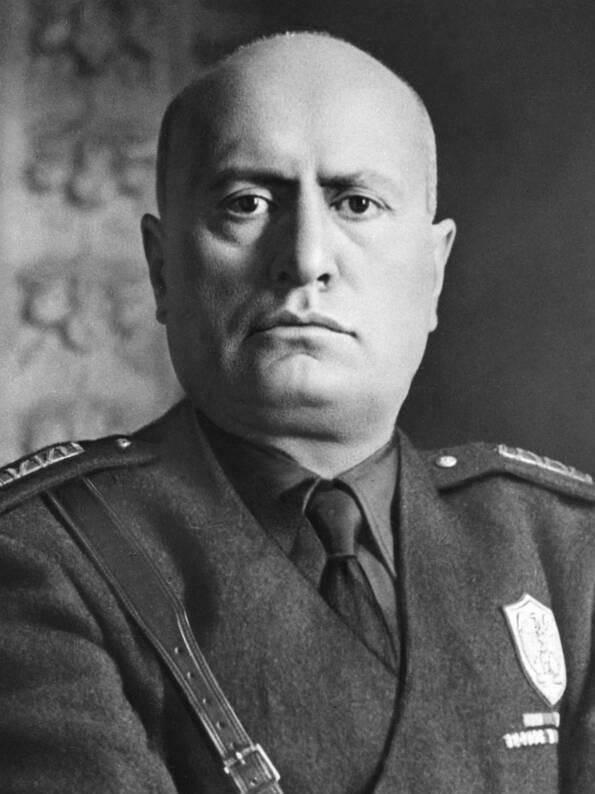
20 years and 267 days: Benito Mussolini (1922–1943) — Longest term and longest total tenure

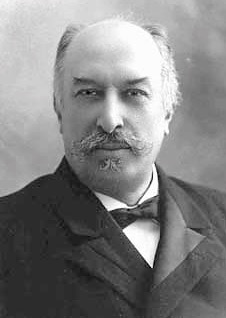
10 years and 184 days: Giovanni Giolitti (1892–1893, 1903–1905, 1906–1909, 1911–1914 and 1920–1921) — Most non-consecutive terms

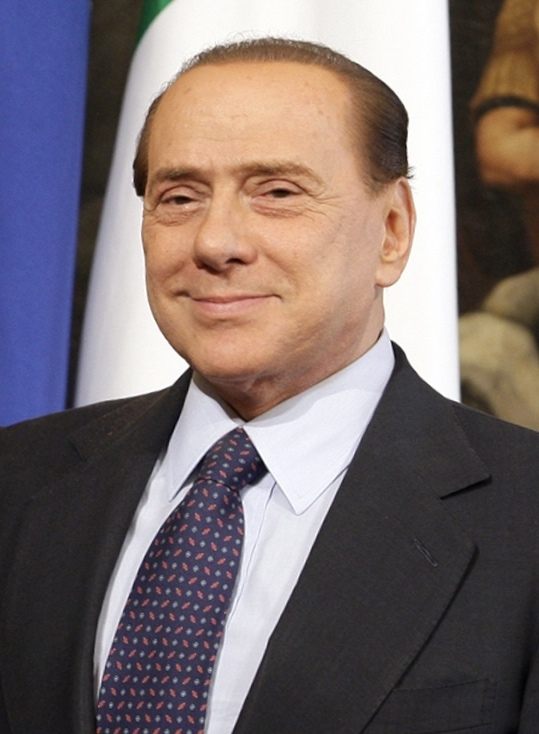
9 years and 53 days: Silvio Berlusconi (1994–1995, 2001–2006 and 2008–2011) — Longest-serving prime minister of the republic

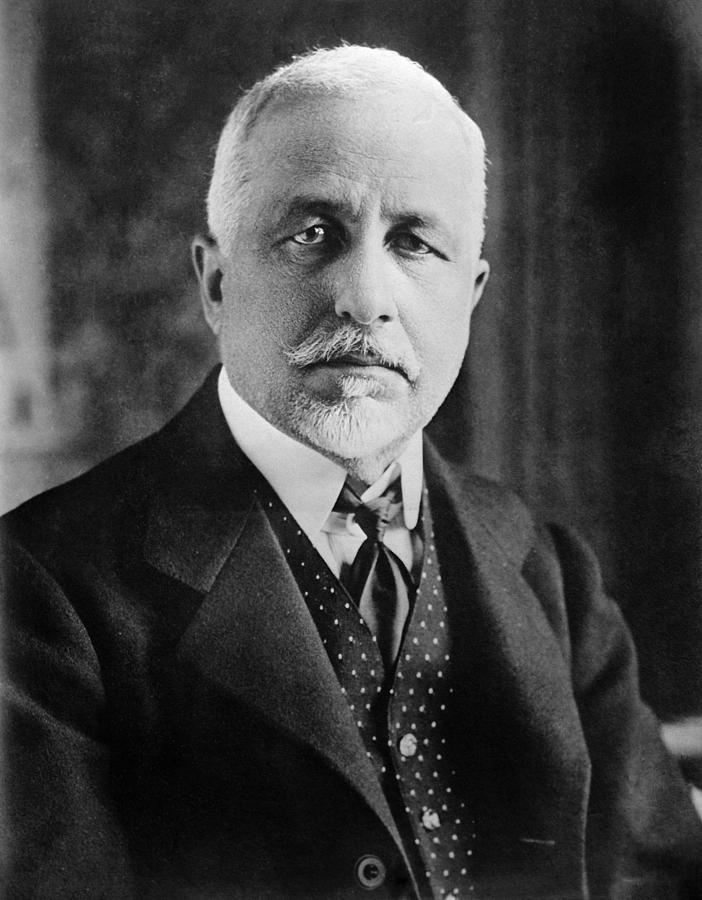
16 days: Tommaso Tittoni (1905) — Shortest-serving prime minister

Of the 60 prime ministers, eight served more than 5 years, while seventeen served less than a year. Benito Mussolini was the longest-serving head of government, having settled a dictatorship and ruled the country for a record of 20 years and 267 days; Tommaso Tittoni was the shortest-serving prime minister, having governed for 16 days only in 1905. The longest-serving prime minister of the Italian Republic was Silvio Berlusconi, who held the position for more than nine years between 1994 and 2011, while the shortest-serving prime minister of the Italian Republic was Fernando Tambroni, who governed for 123 days in 1960.

== List of office holders ==
This list is based on the difference between dates; if counted by the number of calendar days, the figures would be one day greater for each term served.

N.	Prime Minister	Time in office	Party	Term	References
1	Benito Mussolini	20 years, 267 days	National Fascist Party	1	
2	Giovanni Giolitti	10 years, 184 days	Historical Left → Liberal Party	5	
3	Silvio Berlusconi	9 years, 53 days	Forza Italia → The People of Freedom	4	
4	Agostino Depretis	8 years, 275 days	Historical Left	8	
5	Alcide De Gasperi	7 years, 250 days	Christian Democracy	8	
6	Giulio Andreotti	7 years, 122 days	Christian Democracy	7	
7	Aldo Moro	6 years, 89 days	Christian Democracy	5	
8	Francesco Crispi	5 years, 278 days	Historical Left	4	
9	Amintore Fanfani	4 years, 199 days	Christian Democracy	6	
10	Romano Prodi	4 years, 148 days	Independent → Democratic Party	2	
11	Marco Minghetti	4 years, 83 days	Historical Right	2	
12	Giorgia Meloni	3 years, 257 days	Brothers of Italy	1	
13	Bettino Craxi	3 years, 257 days	Italian Socialist Party	2	
14	Antonio Starabba di Rudinì	3 years, 210 days	Historical Right	5	
15	Giovanni Lanza	3 years, 208 days	Historical Right	1	
16	Mariano Rumor	3 years, 9 days	Christian Democracy	5	
17	Antonio Segni	2 years, 357 days	Christian Democracy	2	
18	Matteo Renzi	2 years, 294 days	Democratic Party	1	
19	Giuseppe Zanardelli	2 years, 261 days	Historical Left	1	
20	Giuseppe Conte	2 years, 257 days	Independent	2	
21	Benedetto Cairoli	2 years, 224 days	Historical Left	2	
22	Antonio Salandra	2 years, 89 days	Liberal Party	2	
23	Luigi Federico Menabrea	2 years, 48 days	Historical Right	3	
24	Luigi Pelloux	1 year, 360 days	Military	2	
25	Giuliano Amato	1 year, 350 days	Italian Socialist Party → Independent	2	
26	Alfonso Ferrero La Marmora	1 year, 265 days	Military	2	
27	Mario Draghi	1 year, 251 days	Independent	1	
28	Ivanoe Bonomi	1 year, 240 days	Reformist Socialist → Labour Democratic Party	3	
29	Vittorio Emanuele Orlando	1 year, 216 days	Liberal Party	1	
30	Emilio Colombo	1 year, 196 days	Christian Democracy	1	
31	Bettino Ricasoli	1 year, 193 days	Historical Right	2	
32	Massimo D'Alema	1 year, 188 days	Democrats of the Left	2	
33	Paolo Gentiloni	1 year, 171 days	Democratic Party	1	
34	Mario Monti	1 year, 163 days	Independent	1	
35	Giovanni Spadolini	1 year, 156 days	Italian Republican Party	2	
36	Mario Scelba	1 year, 146 days	Christian Democracy	1	
37	Paolo Boselli	1 year, 134 days	Liberal Party	1	
38	Lamberto Dini	1 year, 122 days	Independent	1	
39	Urbano Rattazzi	1 year, 115 days	Historical Left	2	
40	Ciriaco De Mita	1 year, 101 days	Christian Democracy	1	
41	Francesco Cossiga	1 year, 74 days	Christian Democracy	2	
42	Adone Zoli	1 year, 43 days	Christian Democracy	1	
43	Carlo Azeglio Ciampi	1 year, 13 days	Independent	1	
44	Luigi Luzzatti	364 days	Historical Right	1	
45	Francesco Saverio Nitti	358 days	Italian Radical Party	2	
46	Giovanni Leone	337 days	Christian Democracy	2	
47	Pietro Badoglio	329 days	Military	2	
48	Alessandro Fortis	317 days	Historical Left	2	
49	Enrico Letta	300 days	Democratic Party	1	
50	Giovanni Goria	259 days	Christian Democracy	1	
51	Arnaldo Forlani	253 days	Christian Democracy	1	
52	Luigi Facta	247 days	Liberal Party → Italian Liberal Party	2	
53	Giuseppe Saracco	236 days	Historical Left	1	
54	Sidney Sonnino	220 days	Historical Right	2	
55	Ferruccio Parri	172 days	Action Party	1	
56	Giuseppe Pella	155 days	Christian Democracy	1	
57	Fernando Tambroni	123 days	Christian Democracy	1	
58	Luigi Carlo Farini	106 days	Historical Right	1	
59	Camillo Benso di Cavour	75 days	Historical Right	1	
60	Tommaso Tittoni	16 days	Historical Right	1	

== See also ==
- List of prime ministers of Italy
