= Teofilo Rossi =

Italian lawyer and politician (1865–1927)

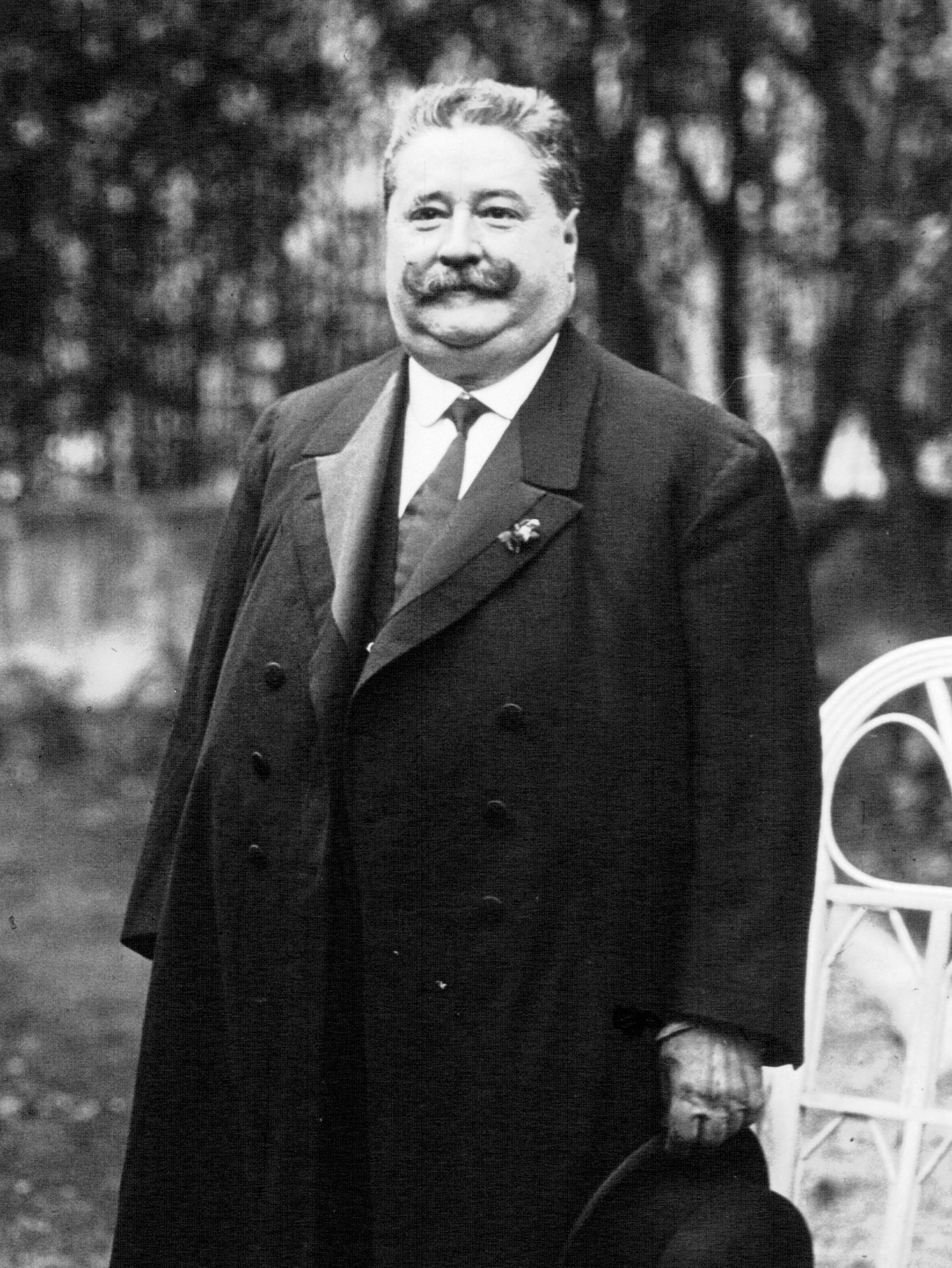
- Rossi in 1916

Minister of Industry and Commerce
- In office 25 February 1922 – 31 July 1923
- Prime Minister: Luigi Facta; Benito Mussolini
- Succeeded by: Office abolished

Mayor of Turin
- In office 28 June 1909 – 11 June 1917

Personal details
- Born: 27 October 1865 Chieri, Kingdom of Italy
- Died: 27 December 1927 (aged 62) Turin, Kingdom of Italy
- Party: Italian Liberal Party
- Spouse: Clotilde Bosso
- Children: 2
- Education: University of Turin
- Occupation: Lawyer
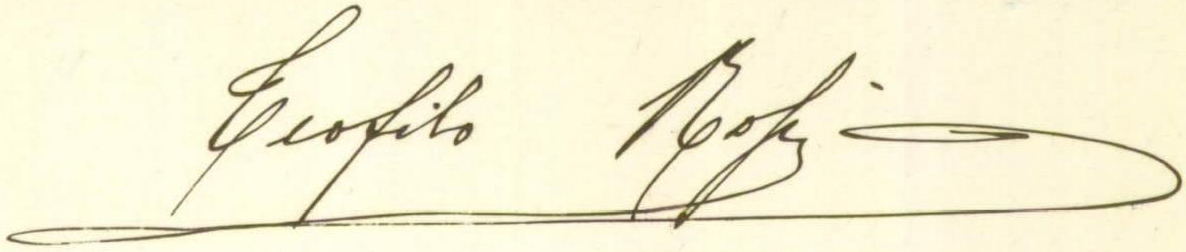
- Signature

Teofilo Rossi (1865–1927) was an Italian lawyer and politician who served at the Italian Parliament for four successive terms between 1898 and 1909. He was also minister of industry and commerce from 31 October 1922 to 31 July 1923. He was the co-owner of the Italian company Martini & Rossi.

== Early life and education ==
Rossi was born in Chieri on 27 October 1865. His father was the founder of an aromatized wine and liqueur company, which became Martini & Rossi. He was a graduate of the University of Turin where he obtained a degree in law in 1886.

== Career ==
Rossi was the councillor of the chamber of commerce in Turin in 1893. Between 1896 and 1908, he served as the city councillor of Turin, which he held again in the period 1921–1924. He headed the chamber twice: first between 1902 and 1909 and between 1921 and 1924. He was among the founders and owners of Martini & Rossi. In 1898 he was elected to the Italian Parliament and served in four successive legislatures, namely XX, XXI, XXII and XXIII, representing Carmagnola. From March to July 1909 he was a member of the Italian Senate. The same year he also served as the state secretary at the Ministry of Posts and Telegraphs from 4 April to 1 July. On 28 June 1909 he was elected as the mayor of Turin which he held until 11 June 1917.

Teofilo Rossi served as vice-president of the Executive Committee for the Turin International 1911 world fair.

Rossi was a member of the Italian Liberal Party. On 25 February 1922 he was appointed minister of industry and commerce to the cabinet led by Prime Minister Luigi Facta. Rossi continued to serve in the same post in the next cabinet of Facta and then in the cabinet led by Benito Mussolini until 31 July 1923. Rossi was removed from office, and the ministry was reorganized as the Ministry of National Economy, to which Aldo Oviglio was appointed as minister. In 1924, he was elected as the president of the Union of Chambers of commerce which he held until 1927.

Fond of literature, Rossi cofounded the book series Società Storica Subalpina in 1895 and Biblioteca della Società Storica Subalpina. He was a co-author of the voluminous and unfinished Storia di Torino. He was also the president of the Museo nazionale del Risorgimento Italiano.

== Personal life and death ==
Rossi was married to Clotilde Bosso, with whom he had two children: Teofila Alessandrina, who married the Marquis Giovanni dei Medici del Vascello, and Metello Cesare, who married Adele of the Guidobono Cavalchini Roero Di San Severino. He died in Turin on 29 December 1927.

== Awards and honours ==
Rossi was named count of Monterela by a royal decree dated 27 April 1911. He was the recipient of the following:

- Commander of the Order of the Crown of Italy
- Grand Cordon of the Order of the Crown of Italy
- Commander of the Order of Saints Maurice and Lazarus (11 December 1904)
- Grand officer of the Order of Saints Maurice and Lazarus (20 January 1913)
- Grand cordon of the Order of Saints Maurice and Lazarus (28 December 1913)
- Grand Cordon of the Legion of Honour (France)
- Grand Cross of the Sovereign Military Order of Malta

== Bibliography ==
- T. Ricardi di Netro (2016). Reofilo Rossi. Il Sindaco di Torino della Grande Esposizione (in Italian). Centro Studi Piemontesi. ISBN 978-8882622473.
