= 1934 Italian general election =

- 25 March 1934

All 400 seats in the Chamber of Deputies 201 seats needed for a majority
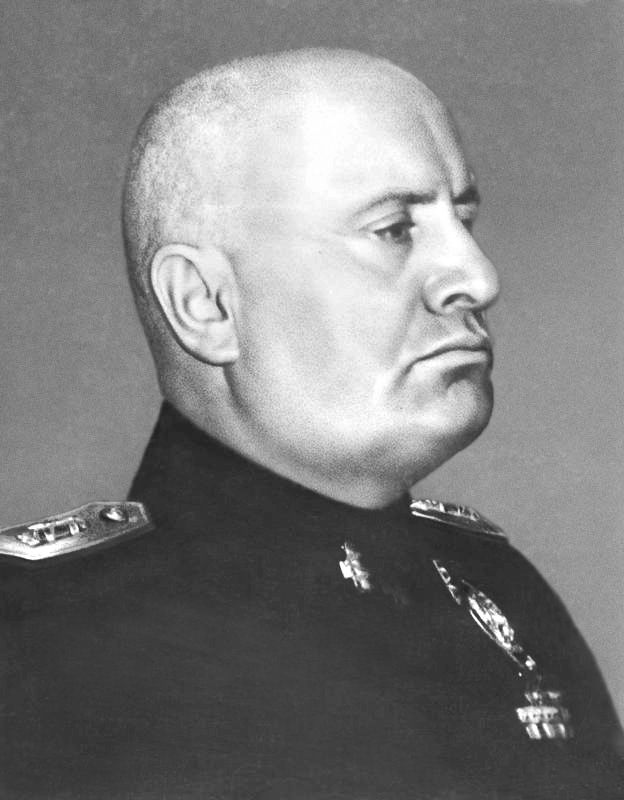
	Majority party
Leader	Benito Mussolini
Party	PNF
Seats won	400
Seat change	Steady
Popular vote	10,045,477
Percentage	99.85%
Swing	▲1.55 pp
Prime Minister before election
Benito Mussolini
PNF
Elected Prime Minister
Benito Mussolini
PNF

General elections were held in Italy on 26 March 1934. At the time, the country was a single-party state with the National Fascist Party (PNF) as the only legally permitted party.

Following parliamentary reforms enacted in 1928 by the Chamber of Deputies and Senate, the elections were held in the form of a referendum. The Grand Council of Fascism, an official state organ since December 1928, was allowed to compose a single party list to be either approved or rejected by the voters. The list put forward was ultimately approved by 99.84% of voters. The overwhelming majority provoked Benito Mussolini to dub the election the "second referendum of Fascism."

These would be the last elections of any sort held under Fascist rule. In 1939, the Chamber of Deputies was replaced with the Chamber of Fasces and Corporations, whose members were not elected but instead nominated by party organs.

== Background ==
In 1929 a concordat with the Vatican was signed, ending decades of struggle between the Italian state and the Papacy that dated back to the 1870 takeover of the Papal States by the House of Savoy during the unification of Italy. The Lateran treaties, by which the Italian state was at last recognized by the Catholic Church, and the independence of Vatican City was recognized by the Italian state, were so much appreciated by the ecclesiastic hierarchy that Pope Pius XI acclaimed Mussolini as a "Man of Providence".

During 1930s, a number of organisations suppressed opposition to Mussolini's regime. The MVSN or "Blackshirts" terrorized urban and provincial resistance. OVRA, an institutionalized secret police, was founded in 1927 with official state support. Opponents of the regime were often imprisoned or sent to confino (internal exile within Italy).

After Adolf Hitler came into power, threatening Italian interests in Austria and the Danube basin, Mussolini proposed the Four Power Pact with Britain, France and Germany in 1933. When the Austrian 'austro-fascist' Chancellor Engelbert Dollfuss was assassinated on 25 July 1934, by National-Socialist supporters, Mussolini even threatened Germany with war in the event of a German invasion of Austria. Mussolini for a period of time continued strictly opposing any German attempt to obtain Anschluss and promoted the ephemeral Stresa Front against Germany in 1935.

== Electoral system ==
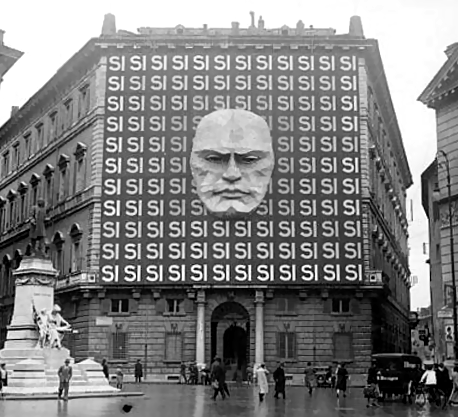
Facade of the Palazzo Braschi, Rome, in 1934, with Mussolini's face and the word "SI" (yes) repeated.

As was the case in the 1929 election, universal male suffrage was restricted to men who were members of trade unions or associations, soldiers and members of the clergy.

The election was a plebiscite; voters could vote "Yes" or "No" to approve or disapprove the list of deputies nominated by the Grand Council of Fascism. The voter was provided with two equal-sized sheets, white outside, inside bearing the words "Do you approve the list of members appointed by the Grand National Council of Fascism?" The "Yes" ballot paper was decorated with the Italian tricolour, while the "No" paper was plain.

The voter would be presented with both ballot papers, choosing one of the two and discarding the other in the voting booth. He would then fold over his chosen paper and present it to the electoral officials to ensure it was sealed. The process would not be considered free and fair by modern standards.

Theoretically, if the "No" option had won, the election would have been repeated with the admission of other electoral lists.

== Results ==
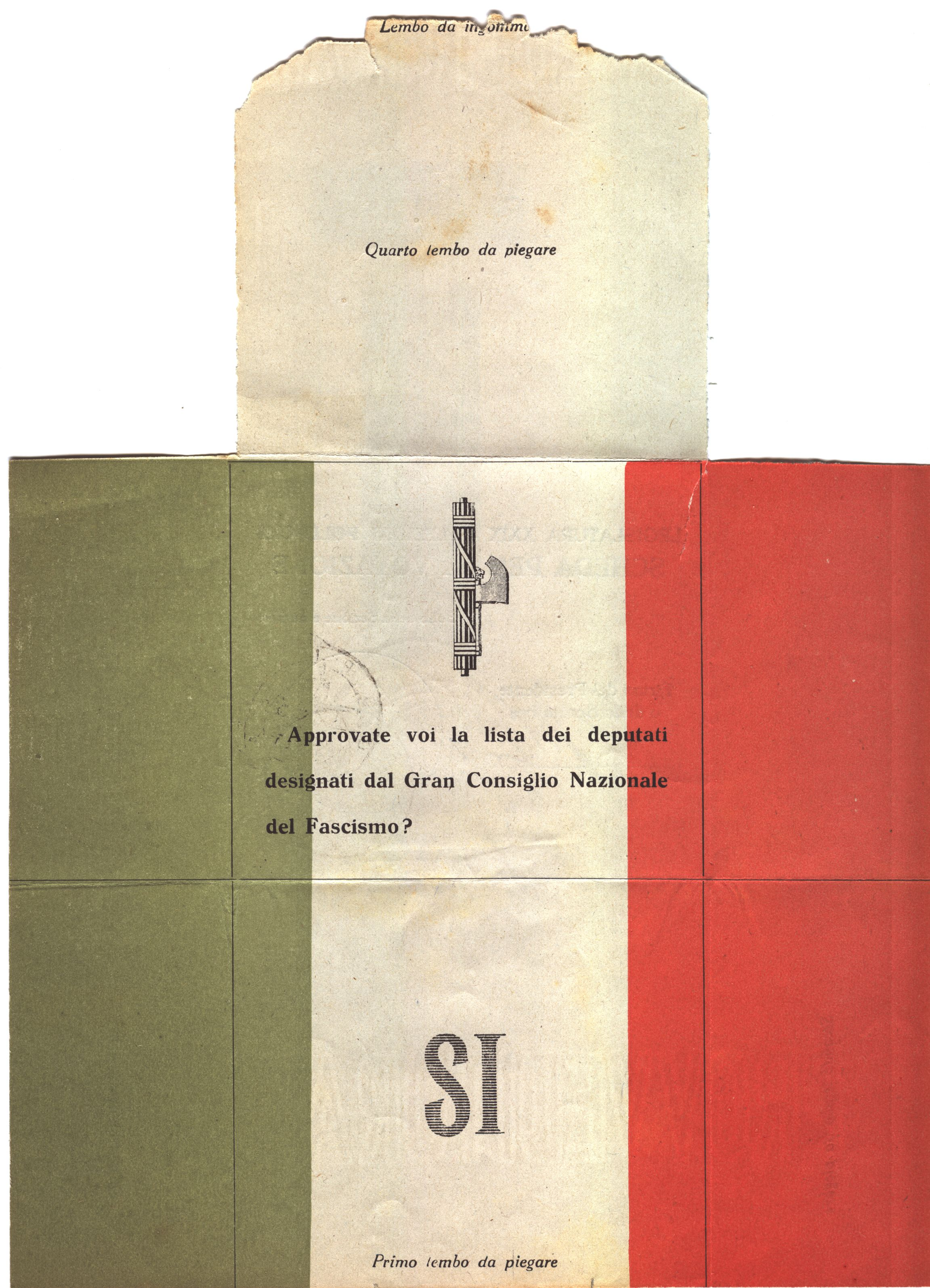
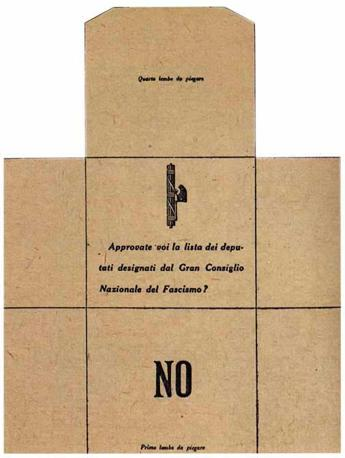
Ballot cards for yes and no options. The voters simply folded the card with their preference and discarded the other inside the voting booth.

Party	Votes	%	Seats	+/–
National Fascist Party	10,045,477	99.85	400	0
Against	15,201	0.15	–	–
Total	10,060,678	100.00	400	0
Valid votes	10,060,678	99.99		
Invalid/blank votes	1,300	0.01		
Total votes	10,061,978	100.00		
Registered voters/turnout	10,526,504	95.59		
Source: Direct Democracy
