= Order of San Marino =

Order

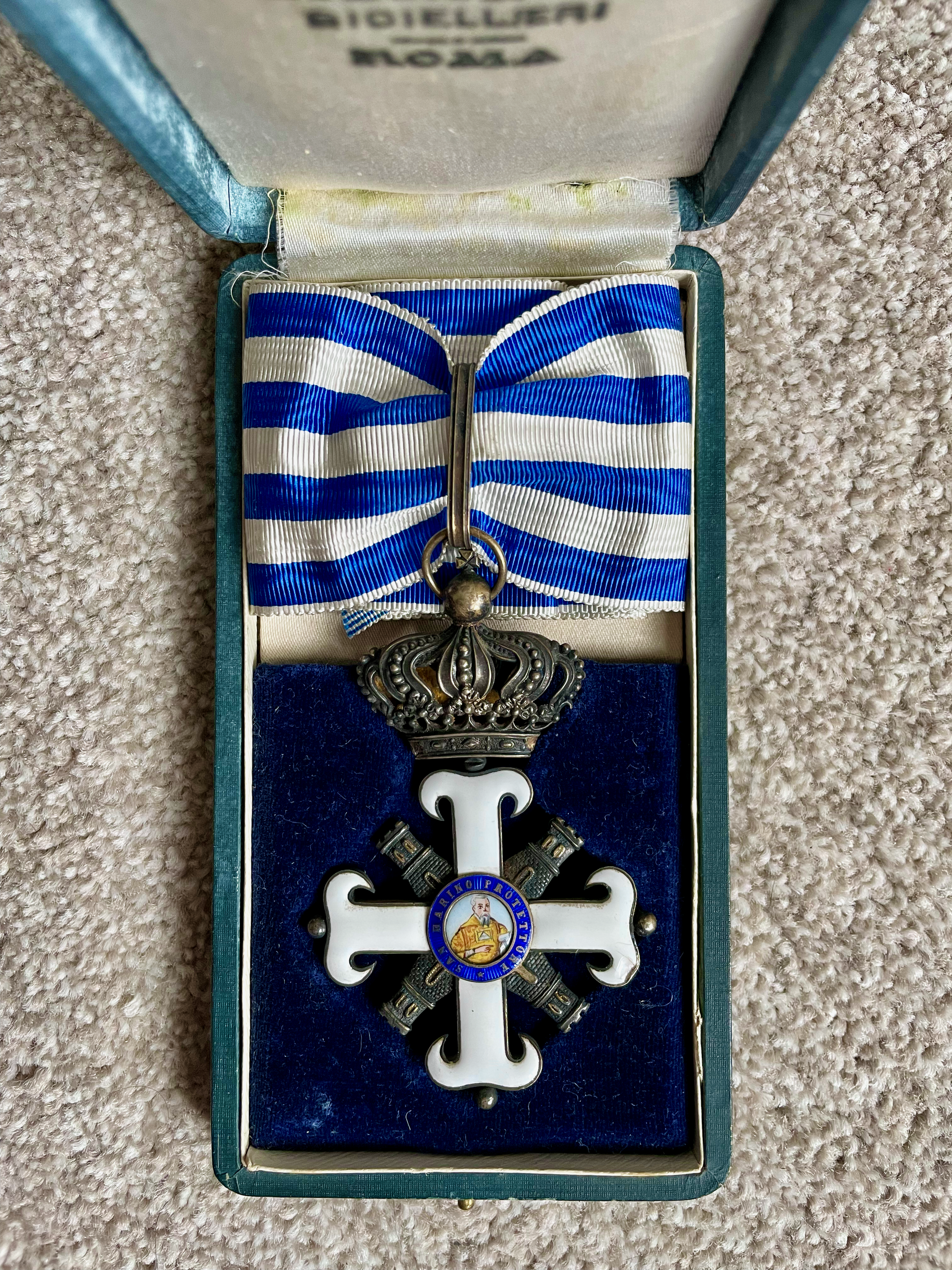
- Neck badge of a commander of the Order
- Type: State order
- Established: 13 August 1859
- Country: San Marino
- Motto: Relinquo vos liberos ab utroque homine (I leave you free from both men)
- Awarded for: Outstanding civil or military services to the Republic, or for humanitarian, artistic, political or scientific accomplishment.
- Grandmaster: Captains Regent
- Secretary: Secretary for Foreign Affairs

Precedence
- Next (higher): None
- Next (lower): Order of Saint Agatha

The Order of San Marino or Civil and Military Equestrian Order of Saint Marinus (Italian: Ordine Equestre Civile e Militare di San Marino) is an order of San Marino. Established 13 August 1859, the order is presented for outstanding civil or military services to the Republic, or for humanitarian, artistic, political or scientific accomplishment. It is only ever awarded to people who are not citizens of the Republic of San Marino.

The Equestrian Order of San Marino is divided into five ranks: Knight Grand Cross, Knight Grand Officer, Knight Major Officer or Commander, Knight Officer and Knight. The first rank of the Order is only awarded to sovereigns, members of reigning families, high state officials, or to those who have rendered extraordinary services to the Republic of San Marino.

The badge of the Order of San Marino is a birostrate cross of gold, enamelled in white. It is flanked by four golden towers. The badge is charged on one side with a round shield, circled in blue with the words: San Marino Protettore. An image of Saint Marinus is in the centre of the shield. On the other side, the San Marino coats of arms is encircled by the words Merito Civile e Militare and the badge is bordered by a golden crown. The ribbon is of wavy silk with alternating blue and white stripes.

The Knights of the Grand Cross also have a star which is a white birostrate cross. This is charged with a blue, round shield with the inscription: Relinquo vos liberos ab utroque homine. It is surrounded by a garland of enamelled oak and olive branches; these are leaning against a ray of four golden beams alternating with four silver beams. The Grand Officers of the order also have the same star, but of a smaller size.

The Order of Saint Agatha is the next lower in order of precedence.

== Grades ==
The order is presented in five ranks:

1. Knight of Grand Cross (Cavaliere di Gran Croce)
2. Knight Grand Officer (Cavaliere Grand'Ufficiale)
3. Knight Major Officer or Commander (Cavaliere Ufficiale Maggiore or Commendatore)
4. Knight Officer (Cavaliere Ufficiale)
5. Knight (Cavaliere)

Ribbon bars of the Order of San Marino
Knight	Officer	Commander	Grand Officer	Grand Cross

== Collar ==
With the decree of 30 April 1964, the Collar of the Order was established, which is normally conferred on heads of state by the Grand and General Council.

== Recipients ==
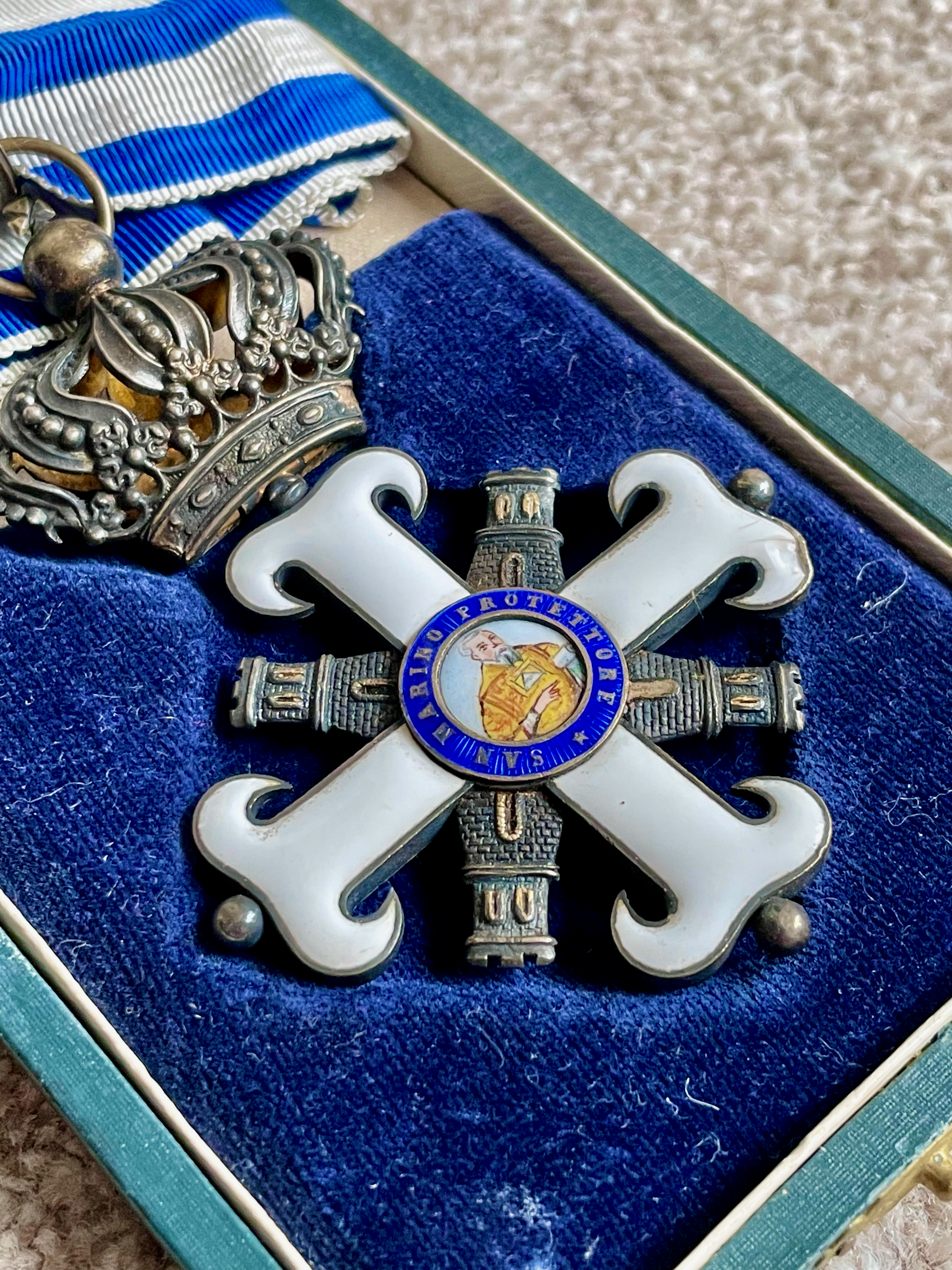
Order of St Marinus - Third Class Commander badge.

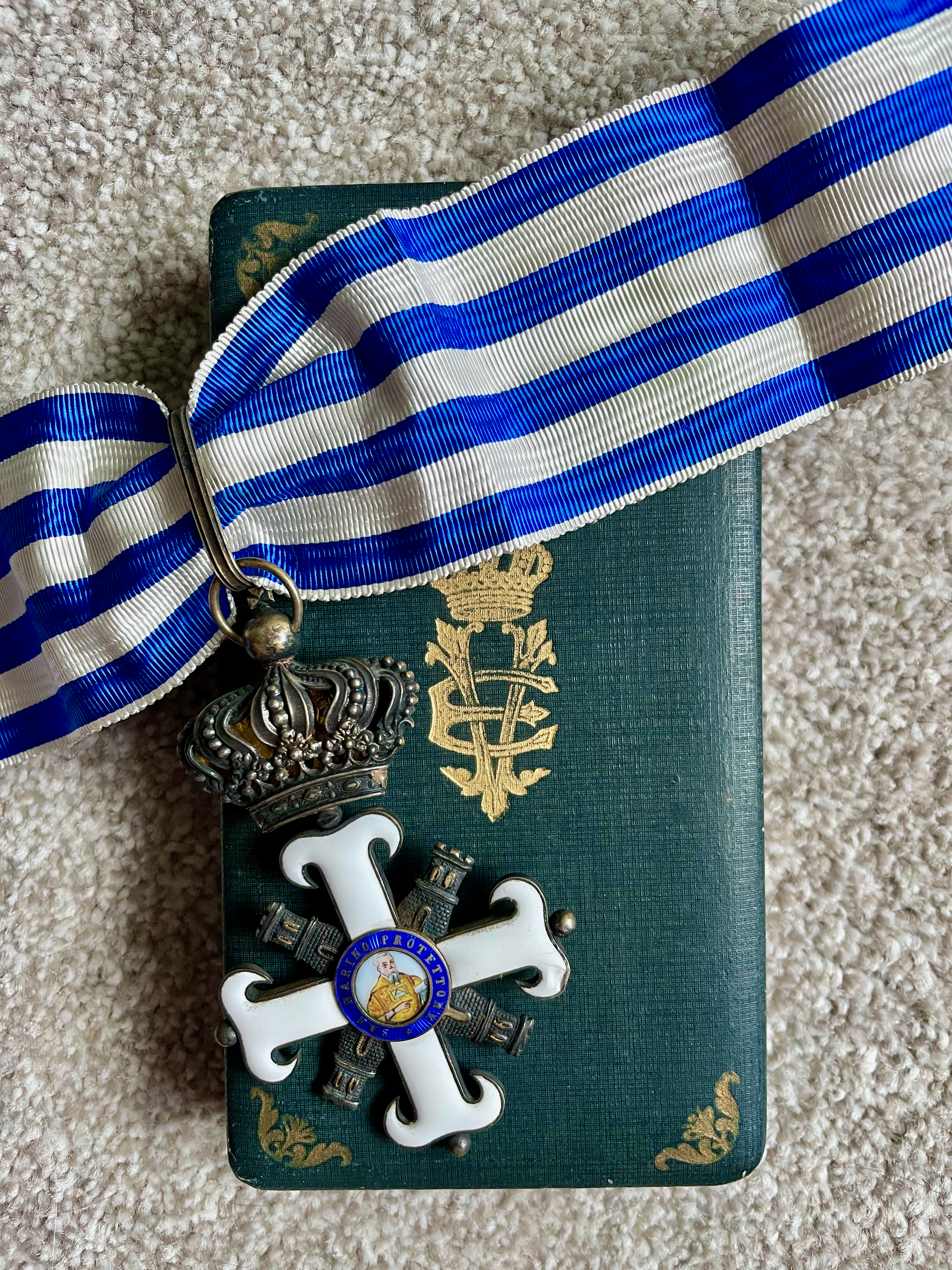
Order of St Marinus - Third Class Commander set.

Prominent people who have been awarded the Order of San Marino

Date of award	Country	Recipient
	Kingdom of Italy	Giuseppe Natoli
1889	Kingdom of Italy	Victor Emmanuel III of Italy
	Kingdom of Italy	Francesco Azzuri
	Kingdom of Italy	Pietro Gasparri
23 September 1907	Kingdom of Italy	Camillo Peano
27 November 1918	Kingdom of Italy	Pietro Badoglio
13 March 1919	United States	Thomas Nelson Page
13 March 1919	Kingdom of Italy	Sidney Sonnino
16 September 1926	France	Gaston Doumergue
15 September 1928	Kingdom of Italy	Costanzo Ciano
15 September 1931	United States	Victor J. Dowling
15 September 1931	United States	Jimmy Walker
19 May 1932	Kingdom of Italy	Pope Pius XII
22 November 1934	United Kingdom	George V
30 March 1935	Monaco	Louis II, Prince of Monaco
6 July 1935	Kingdom of Italy	Ludovico Chigi Albani della Rovere
20 February 1937	United Kingdom	George VI
6 May 1939	Kingdom of Italy	Galeazzo Ciano
6 February 1945	United Kingdom	Harold Alexander, 1st Earl Alexander of Tunis
6 February 1945	United States	Edgar Erskine Hume
4 December 1945	United States	Ellery W. Stone
30 March 1948	Italy	Alcide De Gasperi
30 March 1948	Italy	Carlo Sforza
18 February 1950	Monaco	Rainier III, Prince of Monaco
11 June 1953	Italy	Luigi Einaudi
17 November 1953	France	Vincent Auriol
27 February 1954	France	Georges Bidault
27 February 1954	France	Joseph Laniel
24 May 1955	Italy	Giovanni Gronchi
1967	Yugoslavia	Josip Broz Tito
2006	Netherlands	René van der Linden
2014	Italy	Giorgio Napolitano
2015	Monaco	Albert II, Prince of Monaco
2021	Italy	Sergio Mattarella
2022	Montenegro	Milo Đukanović
2022	United Kingdom	Elizabeth II
	Netherlands	Prince Carlos, Duke of Parma
