= Camillo Peano =

Italian politician (1863–1930)

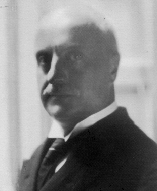

Minister of Treasury
- In office 26 February 1922 – 1 August 1922
- Prime Minister: Luigi Facta

Minister of Public Works
- In office 22 May 1920 – 1 August 1921
- Prime Minister: Francesco Saverio Nitti; Giovanni Giolitti

Personal details
- Born: 5 June 1863 Saluzzo, Kingdom of Italy
- Died: 13 May 1930 (aged 66) Rome, Kingdom of Italy
- Party: Italian Democratic Liberal Party
- Spouse: Giuseppina Buttini
- Children: 2
- Education: University of Turin

Camillo Peano (1863–1930) was an Italian jurist and politician. He held several cabinet posts, including minister of public works and minister of treasury in the early 1920s.

== Early life and education ==
Peano was born in Saluzzo on 5 June 1863. He obtained a degree in law from the University of Turin.

== Career and activities ==
Peano was elected as a deputy 1913 and served in the 24th, 25th and 26th terms at the Parliament. He was a member of the Italian Democratic Liberal Party and was one of the allies of Giovanni Giolitti. Peano served as the minister of public works between 22 May 1920 and 4 July 1921. He was named as the minister of treasury on 26 February 1922 and held the post until 1 August 1922. The cabinet was led by Luigi Facta. Peano also became a senator in October 1922.

Peano was the president of the Court of Auditors from 16 October 1922 to 1 January 1929. During his term the pensions code was published in 1927. He had initiated the discussions to change the law since 1922 while he was serving as the minister of treasury.

== Personal life and death ==
Peano was married to Giuseppina Buttini, and they had two children, a daughter and a son. He died in Rome on 13 May 1930.

=== Awards ===
Peano was the recipient of the following:

- Knight of the Order of Saints Maurice and Lazarus (18 January 1903)
- Officer of the Order of Saints Maurice and Lazarus (20 January 1907)
- Commander of the Order of Saints Maurice and Lazarus (17 December 1908)
- Grand officer of the Order of Saints Maurice and Lazarus (5 December 1909)
- Grand Cordon of the Order of Saints Maurice and Lazarus (5 June 1921)
- Grand Cordon of the Order of the Crown of Italy (10 November 1912)
- Grand Officer of the Order of San Marino (23 September 1907)
- Commander of the Order of the Savior (Kingdom of Greece) (31 January 1907)
- Grand Cordon of the Order of St. Stanislaus (Russian Empire) (1910)
- Commander of the Order of the Legion of Honor (France) (16 October 1911)
