= Trasformismo =

Centrist coalition-forming in the Kingdom of Italy

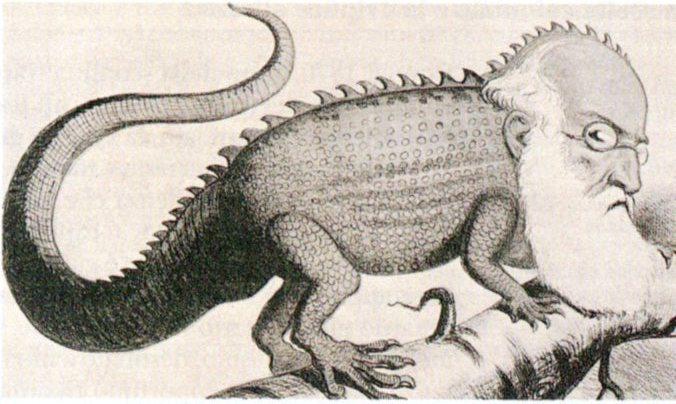
A cartoon about Agostino Depretis, accusing him of being a chameleonic politician

Trasformismo was the method of making a flexible centrist coalition of government which isolated the extremes of the political left and the political right in Italian politics after the Italian unification and before the rise of Benito Mussolini and Italian fascism.

The policy was embraced by Camillo Benso, Count of Cavour, and the Historical Right upon Italian unification and carried over into the post-Risorgimento liberal state. Agostino Depretis, the prime minister in 1883 and a member of the Left, continued the process. He moved to the right and reshuffled his government to include Marco Minghetti's Liberal-Conservatives. Depretis had been considering that move for a while. The aims were to ensure a stable government that would avoid weakening the institutions by extreme shifts to the left or the right and to ensure calm in Italy. At the time, middle-class politicians were more concerned with making deals with one another than with political philosophies and principles. Large coalitions were formed, and members were bribed to join them. The Liberals, the main political group, was tied together by informal gentleman's agreements, but they were always in matters of enriching themselves. Actual governing did not seem to be happening at all, but the limited franchise led to politicians not having to concern themselves with the interests of their constituents.

One of the most successful politicians was Giovanni Giolitti, who succeeded in becoming prime minister on five occasions over twenty years. Under his influence, the Liberals did not develop as a structured party and were a series of informal personal groupings with no formal links to political constituencies. However, trasformismo fed into the debates that the Italian parliamentary system was weak and failing, and became associated with political corruption and was perceived as a sacrifice of principles and policies for short-term gain. The system was loved by few and seemed to be creating a huge gap between politicians and their constituents. The system brought almost no advantages, as illiteracy remained the same in 1912 as before Unification, and backward economic policies and poor sanitary conditions continued to prevent the country's rural areas from improving.

== Use in Gramscian theory ==
The Italian Marxist philosopher Antonio Gramsci described trasformismo as a strategy to prevent the formation of an organized working-class movement by coopting and neutralizing its ideas and leaders within a ruling coalition. Gramsci cited Giolitti's attempt to forge an alliance with the industrial workers of northern Italy under the banner of protectionism as one example of this method. On this account, trasformismo is connected to the process of passive revolution, by which capitalism can be developed in a particular country without the need for overt mobilization of the people.

== In Canada ==
Drawing upon Gramsci's observations, the Canadian historian Ian McKay has suggested that trasformismo also played an important role in Canadian politics. He portrayed the MacDonald–Cartier coalition, the basis of the Conservative Party, which dominated Canadian federal politics in most of the second half of the 19th century, and the Liberal Party, which dominated Canadian politics in the 20th century, as examples of a Canadian variant of trasformismo.

In the 1930s, Professor Frank H. Underhill of the University of Toronto also argued that Canada's two major political parties, the Liberals and the Conservatives, operated in similar ways by advancing the same policies appealing to the same variety of sectional/regional and class interests. In doing so, Canada had perfected the two-party system and had marginalized liberalism and radicalism. Underhill argued the result was a pervasive poverty in Canadian political culture. Not coincidentally, Underhill was centrally involved in the formation of the Co-operative Commonwealth Federation, a farmer-labour coalition born during the Great Depression which became Canada's first successful federal third party, the social-democratic New Democratic Party.

== Bibliography ==
- Nico Perrone (2009). L'inventore del trasformismo. Liborio Romano, strumento di Cavour per la conquista di Napoli [The Inventor of Political Shifting. Liborio Romano, Cavour's Instrument for the Conquest of Naples] (in Italian). Soveria Mannelli: Rubbettino Editore. ISBN 978-88-498-2496-4.
