= Agrarian Party (Italy) =

Agrarian Party Partito Agrario
- Leader: Pietro Lanza di Scalea
- Founded: 1920
- Dissolved: 1924
- Ideology: Agrarianism; Conservatism
- Political position: Right-wing
- National affiliation: National List (1924)

The Agrarian Party (Italian: Partito Agrario, PA) was a right-wing political party in Italy.

== History ==
The Agrarian Party was the main movement of the land owners and it was characterized by a pro-business vision and a conservative and reactionary tendency. Its main members were the prince Pietro Lanza di Scalea, who served as Minister of War in the first government of Luigi Facta and later as Minister of the Colonies in the government of Benito Mussolini, Francesco Saverio d'Ayala and Giovanni Lo Monte.

In 1924, many members of the Agrarian Party merged into Mussolini's National List.
