= Luigi Facta =

Prime Minister of Italy in 1922

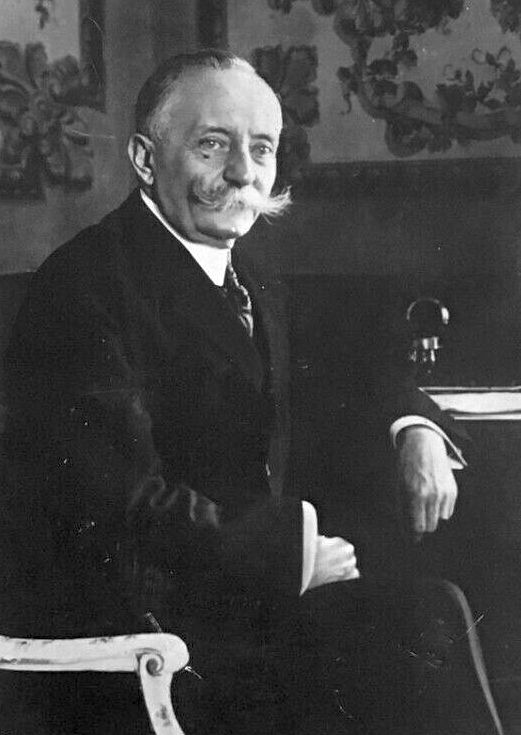
- Facta in 1922

Prime Minister of Italy
- In office 26 February 1922 – 28 October 1922
- Monarch: Victor Emmanuel III
- Preceded by: Ivanoe Bonomi
- Succeeded by: Benito Mussolini

Member of the Senate of the Kingdom
- In office 18 September 1924 – 5 November 1930
- Appointed by: Victor Emmanuel III

Personal details
- Born: 13 September 1861 Pinerolo, Kingdom of Italy
- Died: 5 November 1930 (aged 69) Pinerolo, Kingdom of Italy
- Party: Italian Liberal Party (1922–1926)
- Other political affiliations: Historical Right (1892–1913); Liberals (1913–1922)

Luigi Facta (Italian: [luˈiːdʒi ˈfakta]; 13 September 1861 – 5 November 1930) was an Italian politician, lawyer and journalist and the last prime minister of Italy before the dictatorship of Benito Mussolini.

== Background and earlier career ==
Facta was born in Pinerolo, Piedmont, Italy. He studied law and later became a lawyer and journalist. He entered politics in 1892 when he was elected to the chamber of deputies for Pinerolo, a seat which he held for 30 years. Facta, a member of the Liberal Party, served as undersecretary of the justice and interior departments in the coalition cabinet for much of his time in Parliament. He was also the Italian Minister of Finance from 1910 until 1914 and 1920 until 1921. He served also as minister of justice from 1919 until 1920. At the outbreak of World War I, Facta supported neutrality for Italy, but then supported the war when Italy entered it. His son was killed in the war, and he said that he was proud to give a son to the fatherland.

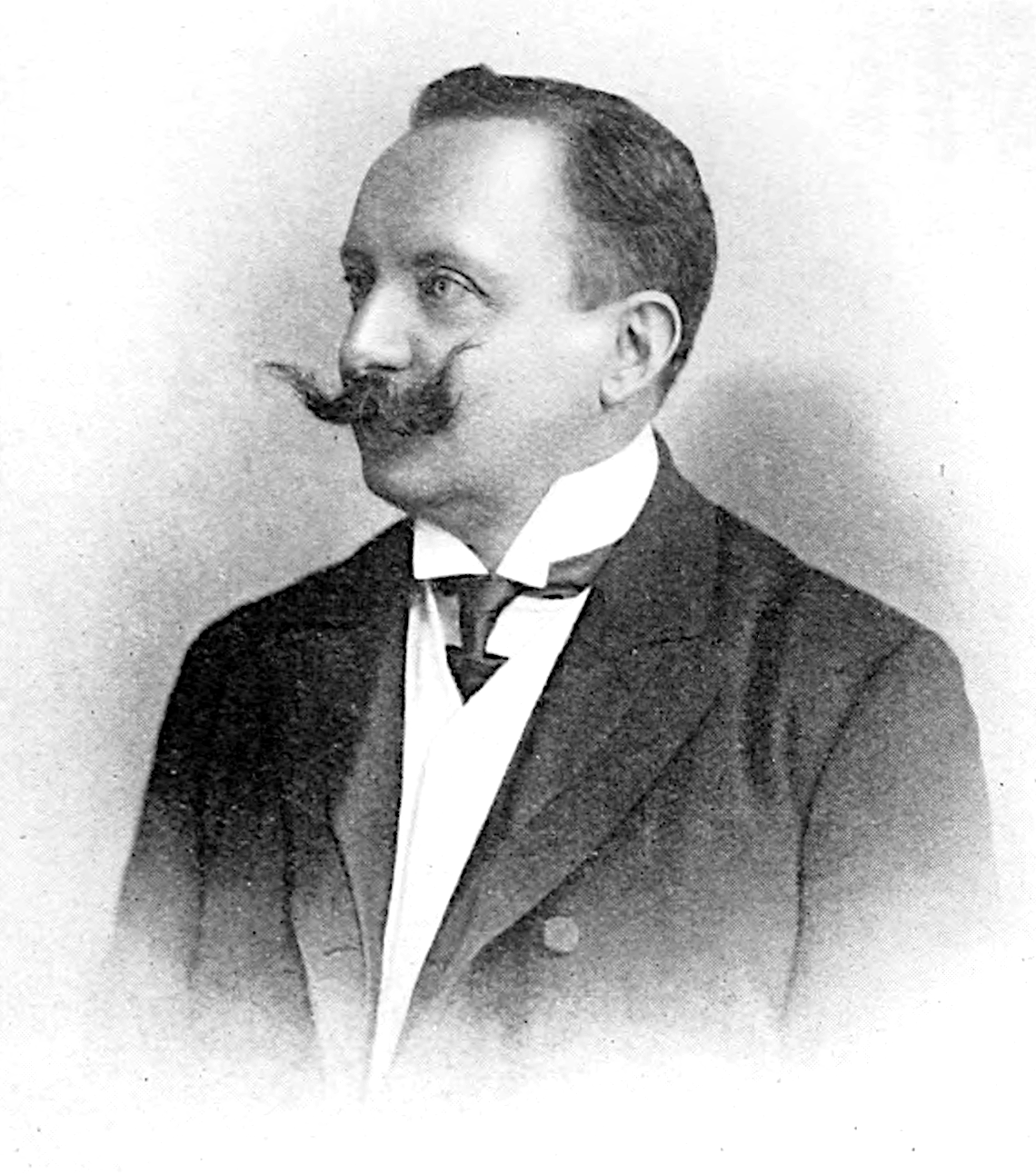
Facta as a Member of the Chamber of Deputies

== Prime Minister of Italy ==
Facta was appointed prime minister in February 1922; leading a centre-right government. As noted by one study, Facta took office "at the head of a Cabinet of definitely more right-wing tendency than the last." At the time, Italy was in political turmoil and was dealing with Mussolini's fascist insurgency. When Mussolini decided to march on Rome, Facta reacted and wanted to declare martial law and send the army to stop Mussolini. A prerequisite for such a declaration to take effect was the monarch's signature, which was not granted. Facta always refused to explain the secret reasons that brought King Victor Emmanuel III not to sign the declaration of emergency. The following day, Facta and his government resigned to demonstrate they did not approve of the King's decision. The King then requested that Mussolini come to Rome to form a new government.

== Later life; death and legacy ==
In 1924, King Victor Emmanuel III named Facta senator in the Italian Senate.

Facta died in Pinerolo, Italy, in 1930, with the general population believing him to have been too feeble and faithful to the King to take a more active role to stop Mussolini and the rise of Fascism.

Political offices
Preceded by Ivanoe Bonomi	Prime Minister of Italy; 1922	Succeeded by Benito Mussolini
Preceded by Ivanoe Bonomi	Italian Minister of the Interior; 1922	Succeeded by Paolino Taddei
