= Schanzer =

Schanzer is a surname of German origin. Notable people with the surname include:

- Carlo Schanzer (1865–1953), Italian jurist and politician
- Jonathan Schanzer, American journalist and author
- Ottone Schanzer (1877–1956), Austrian-Italian librettist
- Rudolf Schanzer (1875–1944), Austrian playwright and journalist

== See also ==
- FC Ingolstadt 04, football team from Ingolstadt, Germany, nicknamed "die Schanzer"
- Schanzer Herz, 2004 song by German band Bonfire, dedicated to FC Ingolstadt 04
