= Duccio Galimberti =

Italian anti-fascist and war-time partisan (1906–1944)

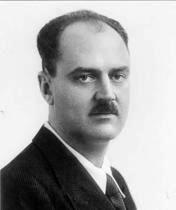
- Born: Tancredi Achille Giuseppe Olimpio Galimberti; 30 April 1906; Centallo, Piedmont, Italy
- Died: 3 December 1944 (aged 38); Cuneo, Piedmont, Italy
- Occupations: Lawyer; Author; Anti-fascist activist War-time partisan
- Parents: Lorenzo Tancredi Galimberti (1856–1939) (father); Alice Galimberti Schanzer (1873–1936) (mother)
- Awards: Gold Medal of Military Valor; Gold Medal of the Resistance

Tancredi Achille Giuseppe Olimpio "Duccio" Galimberti (30 April 1906 – 3 December 1944) was an Italian lawyer who became a committed anti-fascist and war-time partisan. He was an important figure – according to some sources the most important figure – in the Piedmontese anti-fascist resistance, and was a posthumous recipient both of the Gold Medal of Military Valor and of the Gold Medal of the Resistance. During the closing months of the war, he was proclaimed a national hero by the National Liberation Committee for Northern Italy.

== Biography ==
=== Provenance ===
Tancredi Achille Giuseppe Olimpio Galimberti was the younger by two years of his parents' two sons. He was born and spent a contented childhood in Centallo, a small Piedmontese town a short distance to the north of the province capital, Cuneo, positioned between the cities of Genoa to the south and Turin to the north. His father, Lorenzo Tancredi Galimberti (1856–1939), was a lawyer-politician who served as Minister for Postal and Telegraphic communications in the Zanardelli government between 1901 and 1903 and was later, in 1929, appointed to the senate. His mother, born Alice Schanzer, came originally from Vienna: she is frequently identified in Italian language sources not by her married name but simply by her birth name, which is at least in part a tribute to her own eminence as a poet and literary scholar. Despite the impressive quartet of given names with which he was provided at baptism, Galimberti was almost universally known both throughout his life and after his death by the affectionate diminutive "Duccio". An exception was the name by which anti-fascist resistance comrades identified him during the 1940s. Partisan pseudonyms were commonly used to confuse the fascist authorities, and sources dealing with that part of Duccio Galimberti's life may also refer to him as "Professor Garnera".

=== Childhood ===
During the boy's childhood Duccio's father was often a remote figure, frequently preoccupied with his political and business interests. He nevertheless had a relationship of powerful mutual respect with his father, from whom he evidently inherited his wish to study Jurisprudence at university and build a career as a lawyer. He was more directly influenced by his mother, both in emotional terms and in terms of his enduring passion for literature and his "Mazzinian" politics.

Much of Duccio's school-level education took place at home. His parents shared the teaching with a home tutor called Adelina Gazzi. The daily timetable incorporated an alternating programme of Grammar, Arithmetic, Latin, History, Geography and languages study. On Sundays he was taught Piano playing and German (which was his mother's first language). After he successfully passed the exams necessary to move on to the next stage, the tutor Adelina Gazzi stayed on for one more year as the home-schooling continued. By this point it was his mother who increasingly monopolised the teaching responsibilities. She proved skilful at the necessary tasks; but she was also demanding and a strict disciplinarian. Able to learn at his own speed, in one-on-one lessons with his personal teacher, Duccio Galimberti ended up two years ahead of conventionally schooled contemporaries. During 1917/18 he completed two years of the Gynnasio (lower high school) curriculum in a single year, and was just 16 when he enrolled at the Regio Liceo-Ginnasio Silvio Pellico (upper high school) in Cuneo.

The home-schooling]régime that his parent organised for him enabled Duccio Galimberti to acquire a sound broadly based school education, above all through the commitment and skill of his mother. By spending so much time with his parents, he was also able to develop a relatively adult relationship with both of them at an unusually early age. Another important element in developing his cultural and political consciousness was what one source describes as the "physical presence of a newspaper" in the family home. One of his father's principal business interests involved ownership of the "Sentinella delle Alpi", an influential regional newspaper which the proprietor used to share his political opinions, which frequently coincided with those of his friend, the Piedmontese-born statesman Giovanni Giolitti. Outside the family home the newspaper was shamelessly "weaponised" for regional and national elections. Inside the family home, the newspaper's presence made it impossible to plead ignorance of what was going on in the wider world, and made it essential for Duccio and his elder brother to learn from an early age how to form and then to defend an opinion on each of the issues of the day. Nevertheless, at first Duccio was more interested in history and literature than in current events. His mother was a scholar of English literature, and he loved to discuss the plays of the English dramatist Shakespeare with his parents. He went on to read all the (many) works of Mazzini in the family library. Mazzini became something of a guiding light for Duccio Galimberti throughout his adult life; although he never became blind to the impracticalities incorporated within his hero's frequently beguiling world vision.

=== Student years ===
In 1922, having received his high school completion diploma from the Regio Liceo-Ginnasio Silvio Pellico while still aged just 16, he began contributing to his father's newspaper, the "Sentinella delle Alpi". That same year he enrolled at the University of Turin, following in his father's footsteps by studying law. In 1924 he wrote a lengthy political essay about Mazzini. This project appears to have been undertaken in parallel with his university studies, and was not directly related either to jurisprudence or to his newspaper contributions. The essay was largely overlooked at the time, but it was published as a little book in 1963, long after Galimberti's death, in an edition which runs to 109 pages, including an introduction by the political journalist Oliviero Zuccarini and a short biographical note from the historian Vittorio Parmentola. The essay consists of a careful in-depth analysis of Mazzini's entire political doctrine, in the course of which the writer does not omit to draw attention to the elements of uncertainty and utopianism in Mazzini's concept of the state. He graduated from university on 17 July 1926 with a degree in Criminal Law. His degree dissertation, for which he was taught by Eugenio Florian (1869–1945), dealt with "Levels of danger as a determinant of Criminal Sanctions".

=== Not a fascist ===
Following graduation, Galimberti was called up for an initial period of military service. University graduates normally embarked on their military service with the rank of an army officer, but that would have involved enrolling in a special course which might have been construed as some form of personal endorsement of the Mussolini government. It might have meant becoming a party member. Slightly unusually, given his background, Duccio Galimberti undertook his military service in 1926 as a simple "private" conscript. When he was recalled from the army reserve for further service in 1935 and again in 1939, it was with the rank of "Caporal Maggiore" (loosely, "corporal"') in the prestigious "Dronero" battalion of the 2nd Alpini Regiment. He had by this time received and turned down a direct invitation to join the party. He had become increasingly conscious of the dangers to Italy that fascism presented, and of a personal need to become more closely networked with others who were, if not openly opposed to it, at least extraneous to the movement. At the same time there was, for Duccio, a strong sense of filial obligation to avoid openly coming out against the position of his father, whose own relationship with Fascism was more nuanced and, at least in public, unfathomable.

=== Young lawyer ===
In some parts of Italy it was possible to live at home while undertaking military service. It is uncertain whether and to what extent this applied in the case of Duccio Galimberti. During 1926 he embarked on a career as a criminal lawyer, working with his father who was by this time no longer very active in the senate (to which he had been appointed in 1929), preferring to focus on legal work in Cuneo. The younger "Duccio" Galimberti's easy manner made him popular both with clients and with professional colleagues. He also pursued his law studies and research with continued enthusiasm. He followed through on his university researches into the role of danger in criminal law, and wrote a number of essays on legal topics. He also accepted a commission to write the entry on "Social and Criminal Dangerousness" ("Pericolosità sociale e criminale") for the 1937 edition of the Italian encyclopaedia of Jurisprudence ("Enciclopedia giuridica italiana").

In 1934 Galimberti undertook a visit to "Russia", which was still viewed among Italian anti-fascists with a combination of optimistic fascination and, as news of some of the downside of the Soviet experiment began to seep through to those in the west with ears to hear, horror. On his return he gave a number of lectures on the situation, as he had been able to see it, in Russia.

=== Anti-fascism before the war ===
Duccio Galimberti's mother died after a short illness on 4 January 1936. His father died on 1 August 1939. Released from need to avoid political embarrassment to his father, the senator, Duccio Galimberti found himself able to engage in the anti-fascist struggle without family-related constraint. During the second half of 1939 he became involved with the anti-fascist group that met regularly at the Turin home of Ada Gobetti.

Another development, undertaken with friends and colleagues such as Spartaco Beltrand, Vittorio Isaia and Marcello Bianco, was the launch of a literary dinner club, which met at Galimberti's studio-offices. Participants took it in turns to prepare a paper on a previously agreed topic, which formed a basis for a weekly evening discussion. Inevitably Galimberti's papers always involved Giuseppe Mazzini, an abundant producer of literature but also an inescapably political figure in any discussion among Italian intellectuals at the end of the 1930s.

=== War years ===
From an Italian perspective the Second World War broke out not with the German-Soviet Partition of Poland in September 1939, but with the Italian invasion of France in June 1940 which, though brief and militarily inconsequential, cemented the war-time military "axis alliance" between two of Europe's principal "Fascist" powers. During 1940 the literary dinner club meetings departed from their literary aspects and became essentially political in character. Duccio Galimberti rapidly emerged as a leading anti-fascist figure in the Cuneo district.

Towards the end of 1940 Galimberti made a number of visits to Rome where he was able to meet up with Meuccio Ruini and other exponents of pre-fascist politics. Closer to home he built on his connections with anti-fascist circles in Genoa and Turin. Turin, in particular, had become known during the 1930s as a particularly active centre of anti-fascism even if, by 1940, the so-called "Giellisti" leadership had fled into exile. Among those who remained in Italy, Galimberti was keen to establish close relations with any who, regardless of their political beliefs, had become determined to fight the régime. In seeking out contacts, he did not restrict himself to men who were old enough to remember Italian democracy before 1922. One of his most important new contacts was also among then youngest, Dino Giacosa, who had grown up under fascism. Others included Cesare Stoppa and the lawyer Felice Bertolino. Still fervent "Mazzinian", he had still not, at this stage, made a conscious decision to become a leader of contemporary anti-fascism, but he was already creating the network, both within the Cuneo district and further afield, that would facilitate the choice when the time came.

=== Giustizia e Libertà ===
During the second half of 1942 Galimberti joined the Turin-based residuum of the "Justice and Freedom" ("Giustizia e Libertà") movement, (Note: Members of Giustizia e Libertà were known as "Giellisti", a word formed by concatenating the first parts of the two words "Giustizia" and "Libertà", and then gently mangling what was left.) the original leadership of which were in the United States, in prison or, in the case of the movement's founder Carlo Rosselli, had been assassinated on Mussolini's orders some years earlier. By 1942 Galimberti had expanded and consolidated his own little band of Cuneo-based comrades, united by his belief that anti-fascist commitment could and should prevail over any lesser ideological differences. When he became a "Giellista", many of these friend joined with him, including the academics Adolfo Ruata, Luigi Pareyson and Leonardo Ferrero, the mountaineer Edoardo Soria and Arturo Felici, a type-setter.

Having joined GI during 1942, Galimberti moved during the next twelve months with remarkable energy and focus, becoming a leading recruiter-proselytiser among Cuneo's increasingly numerous and fearless anti-fascists. There was, in view of German reverses at Stalingrad, a growing appreciation that the war might, after all, end in defeat for Germany and her "axis" allies. In Cuneo, Galimberti hosted a succession of evening meetings at his home, initially inviting only his most trusted friends and proven political soul-mates, but then cautiously expanding the list of invitees to include locally influential professionals, managers, teachers, students and even a few carefully chosen members of the judiciary and of the military establishment. According to at least one source, the reach of Galimberti's growing network also extended inside the "Gruppo universitario fascista", the Fascist Group at the local university campus. By the start of 1943 Galimberti was the central personality in what can be seen, in retrospect, as the Cuneo-based nucleus of the "Action Party" which emerged as a powerful, if short-lived, political force in post-war Italy.

There was much discussion – possibly premature – of how a post-war Italy should be administered. True, as ever, to his "Mazzinian" ideals, Galimberti foresaw a democratic republic founded on modern principles of economic structures and civil rights, underpinned by the "Action Party". Much of his progressive and internationalist vision went well beyond the ideas emerging from discussion between disgruntled comrades thrown together by a shared opposition to Mussolini and the war. Between the Autumn/Fall of 1942 and July 1943 Galimberti teamed up with Antonino Repaci to produce a draft proposal for a "European and domestic [Italian] federal constitution". (Note: "Progetto di costituzione confederale europea ed interna". The work was published only posthumously, in 1946.)

The authors' prescriptions were infused with Pan-Europeanism. This, together with Galimberti's conscious originality in the context of the progressive "Mazzinianism" that was mainstream among resistance intellectuals, is apparent from the many qualifying phrases incorporated: "... very remote from the position taken by the 'Action Party', whether with respect to its 'seven-points' or its 'sixteen points' – that is, from both of its [two distinctive] souls". (Note: "... assai remoto dalle posizioni del Partito d'azione, sia dei "sette" e sia dei "sedici punti", ovvero da entrambe le sue "anime".) There is a spirit of nineteenth century Liberalism or even, at times, of the Dirigisme associated with republicans and liberals such as Ugo La Malfa, Ferruccio Parri or even certain politically restless socialists such as Emilio Lussu, Francesco De Martino and Tristano Codignola. The project was also steeped in the sort of naivete and utopianism which, elsewhere, Galimberti had previously highlighted in some of the political thinking of Mazzini. There is discussion of a single universal language to be taught in the schools and a prohibition on the creation of national armies. There is also an underlying assumption of a rigidly corporate and socialist state which may appear prescient more than half a century later, but which could not be expected to appeal to the generations that had experienced and still hoped to outlive fascism.

During March 1943 Duccio Galimberti issued an "Appeal to Italians" which he had composed together with Lino Marchisio. It was a typescript document in which the authors highlighted the particularism of each of the political parties and insisted on the need for all the forces of anti-fascism to unite.

=== The fall of Fascism ===
In Rome the Grand Council of Fascism held its final meeting on 24 July 1943. Tunis had fallen. There were clear indications that Anglo-American forces, fresh from their African desert victory and already advancing across Sicily, were preparing to invade mainland Italy from the south. The Grand Council meeting in Rome was a crisis meeting, which ran through the night, and culminated in an overwhelming vote of no confidence in the leader. In the morning the king met the leader and informed him that Marshal Badoglio would take over as leader of the government. Mussolini's arrest followed, as he left the meeting. The fall of fascism was followed by a rapid further transformation in Duccio Galimberti's approach. On the morning of 26 July 1943 he appeared on the first floor balcony of his studio-office, which overlooked the main "Piazza Vittorio" (square) in Cuneo and addressed a crowd made jubilant by news of the dictator's fall. (Note: The "Piazza Vittorio" would be renamed as the "Piazza Galimberti" slightly more than a year later.) His balcony appearance recalled the many balcony speeches delivered from the Palazzo Venezia balcony in Rome's "Piazza Venezia" by the fallen leader between 1929 and 1943, but there was nothing of the fallen fascist leader about Galimberti's message for his fellow townsfolk:

- "Yes, the war continues until the last German has been captured, until the last vestiges of fascism have disappeared!...on till the victory of the Italian people who have revolted against the Mussolini tyranny; but NOT on behalf of an oligarchy that seeks, by throwing Mussolini overboard, to preserve itself at the expense of the Italians".
- "Sì, la guerra continua fino alla cacciata dell'ultimo tedesco, fino alla scomparsa delle ultime vestigia del regime fascista, fino alla vittoria del popolo italiano che si ribella contro la tirannia mussoliniana; ma non si accoda a una oligarchia che cerca, buttando a mare Mussolini, di salvare se stessa a spese degli italiani".

The police intervened and dispersed the people who came to hear Galimberti were dispersed with police batons. Later that day he nevertheless repeated his message at a rally in Turin. His words earned him, from the Badoglio government, an immediate arrest warrant, which was rescinded only three weeks later. Not all his listeners will have understood immediately the message which, in retrospect, is unambiguous; that the only way ahead was the one that involved more war, but now it was a war against the Fascists and against the Germans.

=== Resistance ===
While confusion reigned in Rome as to the future direction of the post-fascist Badoglio government, during August 1943, Galimberti made contact with the commander of Italy's elite 2nd Alpini Regiment – his own former regiment – which was headquartered and stationed in Cuneo. He was, however, not successful in his attempts to persuade the commander of the local regiment to oppose the German army, which had responded to the fall of Mussolini by piling reinforcements over the Brenner Pass into Northern Italy, while the government in Berlin ignored the resulting protests from the Badoglio government. Galimberti's own intention at this time was not to create a local partisan army, but to keep the Italian army operational, and to boost its numbers through the enlistment of able-bodied civilian volunteers able and willing to take up arms against the country's German (former) allies. Although the formal status of the "axis alliance" remained unclear through August, it was clear from German military operations in northern Italy that Berlin already regarded the alliance as dead.

8 September 1943 was the day on which the Armistice of Cassibile, signed slightly less than a week earlier, became public. Italy had changed sides. Galimberti transformed his studio-office in Cuneo's "Piazza Vittorio" into the Operations Centre for organising the popular armed struggle against the expanding German military presence. He still had not given up on the local military commanders, however. On 9 September and again on 10 September he resubmitted his request to the general in command of the "Cuneo zone" to progress with the volunteer enrolment of his activist group into the mountain infantry. But still there was no positive response. Galimberti and his friends now went ahead and implemented what had hitherto been intended only as a contingency plan, creating "bands" for an armed resistance movement of "irregulars". Having chosen this solution, they returned to the military commanders and senior officers in the region in order to seek collaboration over acquiring weaponry, and inviting the regular officers to take command of the groups that were preparing to "move into the surrounding mountains".

=== To the mountains ===
Overnight on 11 / 12 September 1943 Duccio Galimberti, Dante Livio Bianco and ten other friends made their way up into the mountains of the Valle Gesso, directly to the south of Cuneo. (Note: The ten men accompanying Galimberti and Livio Bianco were Dante Giacosa, Leo Scamuzzi, Arturo Felici, Ildo Vivanti, Leonardo Ferrero, "Dado" Soria, Giancarlo Spirolazzi, Ugo Rapisarda and the brothers Enzo and Riccardo Cavaglion.) They made their initial base at the chapel of the Madonna del Colletto, perched between the Valle Gesso and the Val della Stura. Here they formed their first partisan band, giving it the name "Italia Libera" ("Free Italy"). At the same time another little partisan band, also bearing the name "Italia Libera" was being established at Frise in the Valle Grana, over the mountains to the north. This second "Italia Libera" band included Giorgio Bocca, Detto Dalmastro and various other members of Galimberti's circle of friends. These partisan bands turned out to be the nucleus around which, a couple of months later, "Justice and Freedom brigades" ("Brigate Giustizia e Libertà") would be constructed. Almost immediately news came through of the "Gran Sasso raid" by German paratroopers and Waffen-SS commandos, whereby Mussolini was extracted from his Gran Sasso d'Italia mountain-top hotel-prison and flown to Germany where he enjoyed the increasingly rare privilege of a meeting with Adolf Hitler. A week later the recently dismissed was installed as the leader of the Italian Social Republic German puppet state in northern Italy, the territorial extent of which was progressively reduced, from the south. Piedmont, which included the Cuneo region in which the "Justice and Freedom brigades" operated, was therefore part of the fought over puppet state.

Meanwhile, Galimberti's group soon moved on from their chapel base to Paralup near Rittana and then on again to the San Matteo in the mountains above the Valle Grana, where they set up what became a more permanent partisan base during November 1943. Towards the end of 1943 Galimberti engaged in the careful but vital work of connecting and unifying the various little partisan bands that had responded to his call and to the needs of the moment. By the end of 1943 the "Justice and Freedom brigades" had become a reality in the Cuneo region.

There was little scope for disagreement over objectives; and accordingly the most urgent decisions were those involving organisation and efficiency. Decisions were taken over the best uses for the weapons and ammunition that the partisans had acquired, mostly through their having been removed from army barracks. There was also then issue of discipline to be addressed. The "Italia Libera" were quickly in agreement when it came to rejecting the hierarchical and coercive methods associated with the regular army. Instead they drew their inspiration from the nineteenth century "Mazzinian" volunteers and followers of Garibaldi. The hierarchy of the brigades was accordingly almost flat. There was nevertheless no question over who was in charge: Duccio Galimberti. In this capacity he demonstrated a meticulous approach to detailed strategic planning, a capacity for anticipating and weighing up a set of possible outcomes, and thereby a remarkable skill in organising and implementing the partisan struggle. He took care to be involved personally in the recruitment of new fighters and in very critically scrutinizing the "moral worth" of new arrivals. There was a continuing risk that there would be fascist informers among them. The university professor Aldo Visalberghi, who fought as a war-time partisan, and was for much of that time a member of the "Justice and Freedom brigades" based in the Valle Grana, sets much store by the sheer humanity of Galimberti's leadership, citing the ready grin and the wisdom, but also Galimberti's very obvious discomfort when confronted by the need to inflict acts of cruelty, such as the unavoidable reprisal actions against Nazi and Fascist individuals known to have inflicted acts of barbarism on civilian populations.

The overall tactical strategy pursued by Galimberti's "Justice and Freedom brigades" was the traditional one dictated by the relative strengths and weaknesses of mountain-based guerrilla fighters confronting government directed conscript armies. A major aspect of it involved using local knowledge and contacts to make rapid sorties in order to disrupt enemy stores and supplies in the valleys below. This meant undertaking unpredictable targeted acts of aggression designed to demoralise the troops by creating a permanent uncertainty among them, and maximising the extent to which troops had to be held back from front-line fighting in order to protect vital logistical networks. For the partisans, this meant learning to operate with maximum agility, speed and flexibility, and a preparedness to retreat at short notice back to their mountain hide-outs, where local knowledge became a particular benefit. The occupying forces faced a particular challenge in controlling the towns and villages they had over-run, in which the local populations were increasingly hostile, and forces of occupation were often thinly spread. Partisan units from the mountains could appear at short notice to inflict, in the space of perhaps twenty minutes, maximum attrition on German and Fascist units, and then melt away as quickly as they had appeared. The objective, again, was to ensure that the enemy soldiers could never relax.

=== Incapacitated ===
On 13 January 1944 the German military struck back, launching a large-scale attack on the partisan base at San Matteo. They were opposed by what one source terms "the elastic tactics" of the partisans and, as a result, failed in their presumed objectives. Duccio Galimberti suffered a serious ankle injury but refused to be removed from the fighting and thereby abandon his comrades until the clashes were concluded (probably before the end of the day). Initial treatment for the injury was provided by a woman doctor of Polish-Jewish provenance who had recently escaped German captivity and sought (relative) safety among the partisans in the mountains. Once he could be moved he was loaded into an improvised stretcher and transported by comrades using a "safe route" to the home of a trusted farmer near Canale d'Alba, some distance away, and on the other side of Cuneo. The sequence of events at this point is not consistently recorded, but due to the severity of his injuries he appears also to have spent time in the hospital at Canale. Several months of convalescence, concealed on the farm at Canale and/or in the hill-country of nearby Langhe, followed. While immobilised in the countryside Galimberti turned his thoughts to agrarian reform, producing a short thoughtful paper on the subject. (The twelve page essay was published for the first time only posthumously, in 1959). He came out in favour of restrictions on private property, requiring private land to be managed for the public good, under a programme to be administered by local government officials and agencies.

=== Partisan commander ===
By the time he had recovered at the end of the winter, Duccio Galimberti's reputation had spread across and beyond the partisan networks of the Cuneo province. He received and accepted the call to assume overall command of all the "Giellisti" units in Piedmont and to represent Piedmont as a member of the "regional military committee". Within the military committee he assumed the functions of deputy commander. On 5 April 1944, following the arrest by members of the Republican Police Corps and subsequent shooting of Brigadier General Giuseppe Perotti, along with most of the other members of the "regional military committee", it became Galimberti's turn to assume overall command of partisans covering the Valle d'Aosta, the Canavese and the eastern Cuneo province. His responsibilities included frequent travel, which was inherently perilous, and made frequent calls on his natural diplomatic skills, as he inspected one quasi-military band after another, created and communicated reports, plans and directives, while nurturing more effective collaboration between partisan bands from the different language communities of the Italian extreme north-west.

Animated by his Pan-European federalist convictions, and keen to re-establish fraternal relations with French in order to try and blot out the shame of the fascist aggression against that country, on 22 May 1944 Galimberti led the delegation of the Piedmontese National Liberation Committee which met up with a delegation of Maquisards at Barcelonnette in the mountains across the frontier to the west of Cuneo. There was an important strategic purpose in seeking to establish an understanding between anti-fascist resistance fighters on the two sides of the border. Despite the personal shame he clearly felt about Italy's role in the war against France, he was firm in insisting to his French interlocutors that the actions of the Mussolini regime could not reasonably be imputed to the entire Italian nation. He also managed to avoid creating unnecessary friction over the decades-long Franco-Italian tensions involving Aoste/Aosta. The meeting affirmed the participants' shared commitment to the defeat of Nazism and a return of democratic freedoms. It was seen as a useful diplomatic advance for both delegations.

On returning to Italy he resumed his partisan command duties, networking and travelling frequently. When he was not on the road he was based, by now, in Turin. The city had been the centre of Italian opposition to Fascism since at least as far back as 1929, and had also long been a focus of attention for the forces now supporting the Mussolini puppet government and its German masters. Galimberti took the usual precautions, such as never remaining at one address for very long, and identifying himself by a succession of Soviet-style pseudonyms including (but not necessarily restricted to) Garnero, Ferrero, Dario and Leone. Aware that he was becoming a target, comrades offered him the opportunity to accept a national position in the resistance movement, which would have involved moving away from Piedmont. (Rome was liberated at the start of June 1944.) Galimberti rejected the advice to leave town, however.

=== Arrest and questioning ===
It is presumed to have been following a denunciation that on 28 November 1944 Duccio Galimberti was located in a bakery in the Borgo San Paolo quarter of Turin and arrested by the police. According to one source the bakery "Panetteria Raimondo" served as a "sorting centre" for messages and documents. Elsewhere the business is identified simply as the address of the "Partisan Command", and the individuals who arrested Galimberti are identified simply as members of a fascist militia. He was taken to "Le Nuove", Turin's imposing nineteenth century prison complex.

There followed frantic attempts by resistance comrades to negotiate his release in return for German prisoners, of whom by this stage the partisans had captured a considerable number, but the attempts proved unproductive. From the point of view of his captors, it seemed, Duccio Galimberti was beyond price.

Four days after Galimberti's capture, during the afternoon of 2 December, a group of fascists arrived from their Political Bureau at Cuneo and took Galimberti away with them. He was taken to the barracks building used by the "Black Brigade" pro-fascist volunteer paramilitaries in Cuneo. Through the night he was subjected to an intense session of interrogation and physical mutilation. He told his interrogators nothing of significance. The next morning he was still alive, however.

=== Murder ===
Early in the morning of 3 December 1944, following a second night of brutal interrogation, Galimberti was taken in the back of a truck along the main road to the north (SS20), apparently back to Turin. Less than ten kilometers north of Cuneo the truck stopped, however, and Galimberti was pushed out, landing across or in the ditch by the road. By the lane leading to the hamlet of Tetto Croce, he was shot in the back with one or more machine-gun bursts. His dead body was left where it fell. Some sources insist that the generally accepted understanding of dramatic final moments of Galimberti's death is incorrect. According to this alternative version of events, which seems to have originated with family friends during the 1950s, by the time Galimberti's body was dumped in the ditch between the road and the field at Tetto Croce he had already been killed.
