= Francesco Ruffini =

Italian jurist, historian, politician and antifascist

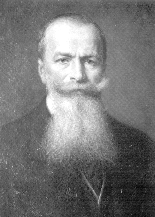
- Born: April 10, 1863; Lessolo
- Died: March 29, 1934 (aged 70)
- Occupations: Senator of the Kingdom of Italy, Dean of the University of Turin
- Notable work: Religious Liberty, Storia dell'idea, Storia del diritto privato italiano, etc.

Francesco Ruffini (Lessolo, April 10, 1863 - Turin, March 29, 1934) was an Italian jurist, historian, politician and antifascist.

== Biography ==
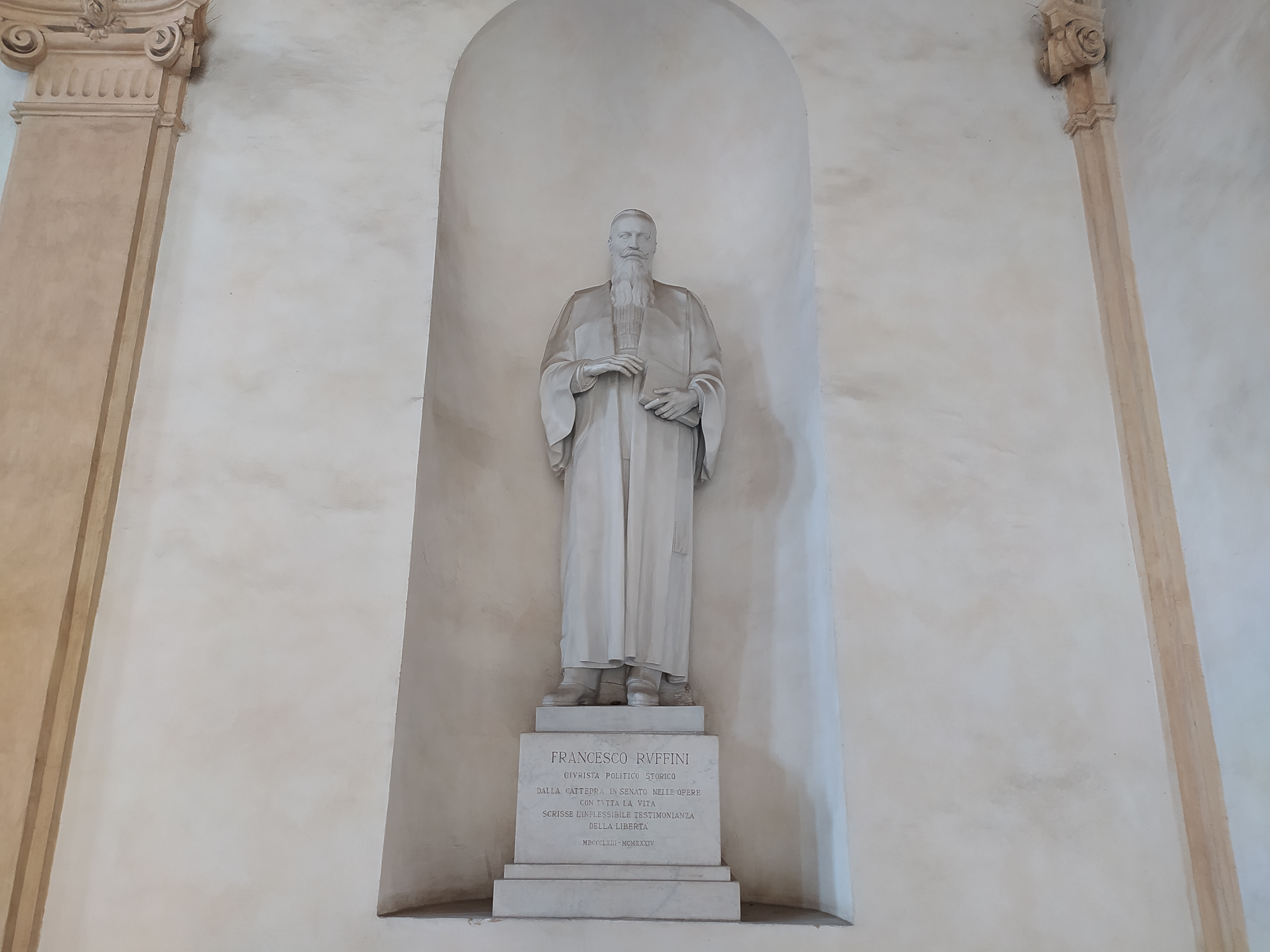
Statue of Francesco Ruffini at the University of Turin.

Francesco Ruffini attended the Liceo Classico Carlo Botta in Ivrea. After teaching in Pavia and Genoa, he became a professor in Turin, first of History of Law, then of Ecclesiastical Law. Among his students there were Arturo Carlo Jemolo, Alessandro Galante Garrone, Piero Gobetti (who was also his editor), and Mario Falco. He was dean of the University of Turin from 1910 to 1913.

He was appointed Senator of the Kingdom of Italy in 1914. A member of numerous academic bodies, including the Academia dei Lincei and the Istituto Lombardo Accademia di Scienze e Lettere, he was president of the Accademia delle Scienze di Torino from 1922 to 1928.

In 1925, he was among the signatories of the Manifesto of the Anti-Fascist Intellectuals, drafted by Benedetto Croce, who in 1927 dedicated to him the book Uomini e cose della vecchia Italia. In 1928 Ruffini was attacked by a group of fascists inside the University of Turin, where he was teaching. Several students took his defense, including Alessandro Galante Garrone and Dante Livio Bianco.

A staunch secularist, together with Benedetto Croce and Alberto Bergamini he openly criticized the Lateran Treaty, voting against its ratification: in the parliamentary session of May 24, 1929, Croce had attacked the hypothesis of creating the Concordat between Church and State.

Together with his son, Edoardo Ruffini Avondo, in 1931 he was among the few professors who gave up their professorships in order not to take the oath of allegiance to fascism. He died three years later in Turin.

Parco Ruffini in Turin, a statue placed in the portico of the University of Turin Dean's Office, and the third floor of the Luigi Einaudi Campus library containing the University of Turin's collection of legal volumes, were dedicated to his memory after the war.

== Works ==
Ruffini has been judged by academics as "a master of freedom" who was always interested in the relationship between state and church. Ruffini studied the figure of Cavour, of whom he was a great admirer.

In 1901, his analysis on the historical origins of the idea of religious freedom resulted in the writing of the work Religious Liberty. The following year, he edited the handbook Storia del diritto privato italiano, written by his professor Cesare Nani and published posthumously.

Also significant is his writing The 'Cabale Italique' in seventeenth-century Geneva, in which Ruffini makes a brief analysis of the Italian lineage that emigrated and settled in Switzerland, and in particular in Geneva, following the Protestant Reform; among other things, there are extensive references to the history of Italy, with a closer look at Tuscany, in particular the city of Lucca.

== Honors ==
- Order of Saints Maurice and Lazarus
- Order of the Crown of Italy

== See also ==
- Piero Gobetti
- Benedetto Croce
- Dante Livio Bianco

== Bibliography ==
- Frangioni, Andrea (2017). Francesco Ruffini. Una biografia intellettuale [Francesco Ruffini. An intellectual biography] (in Italian). Bologna: il Mulino.
- Vidari, Pene; Savino, Gian (2013). "Un centocinquantenario: Francesco Ruffini (1863-1934)" [A sesquicentennial: Francesco Ruffini (1863-1934)]. Studi Piemontesi (in Italian). 42 (2).
- Boatti, Giorgio (2001). Preferirei di no. Le storie dei dodici professori che si opposero a Mussolini [I would rather not. The stories of the twelve professors who opposed Mussolini] (in Italian). Turin: Einaudi.
- Silvestri, Paolo (2009). "Mosca, Ruffini ed Einaudi. Politica, diritto ed economia in difesa della libertà" [Mosca, Ruffini and Einaudi. Politics, Jurisprudence and Economics in Defence of Freedom]. In Marchionatti, R (ed.). La Scuola di economia di Torino. Co-protagonisti ed epigoni [The Turin School of Economics. Co-protagonists and epigones] (in Italian). Florence: Leo Olschki. SSRN 2468038.
- Frauendorf, Sigmund von (1958). Ruffini, Francesco: Studi sui riformatori italiani [Ruffini, Francesco: Studies on Italian reformers] (in Italian). Journal of Political Science.
