= Carlo Schanzer =

Italian jurist and politician (1865–1953)

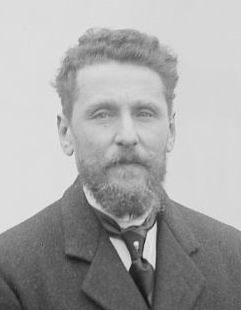
Carlo Schanzer

Carlo Schanzer (18 December 1865 – 23 October 1953) was a Vienna-born Italian jurist and politician. He held several cabinet posts from 1906 to 1922.

== Early life and education ==
Schanzer was born in Vienna on 18 December 1865. His father was a Polish-born business lawyer, and his mother was a pianist. Schanzer had three siblings. His brother Ottone was a librettist and the other, Roberto, was an engineer and mathematician while his sister, Alice, married Tancredi Galimberti, a well-known poet and writer. In the 1870s the family moved to Milan and then to Rome.

After graduating from a high school in Rome Schanze received a bachelor's degree in law in November 1886. In 1888 he obtained Italian citizenship.

== Career ==
Schanzer was a member of the Council of State and then became the director general of the civil administration at the Ministry of the Interior. He was elected to the Italian Parliament in 1900 and to the Italian Senate in 1919. He was appointed minister of posts to the third Giolitti cabinet and was in office in the period 1906–1909. He served as the minister of treasury and as the minister of finance in the first and second cabinets of Francesco Saverio Nitti between 1919 and 1920. Schanzer was named as the minister of foreign affairs to the Facta cabinet on 25 February 1922.

During the Fascist rule in Italy Schanzer continued his public activities and was appointed minister of state in December 1928. Following the end of the Fascist period Carlo Sforza, high commissioner for the sanctions against fascism, proposed Schanzer's forfeiture on 7 August 1944 based on the verdict of the a higher court dated 21 October 1944. Against the order Schanzer appealed to the Supreme Court of Cassation which annulled the forfeiture on 8 July 1948.

== Personal life and death ==
Schanzer published several articles in different academic journals, including Current History. On 20 July 1899 he married Corinna Centurini with whom he had two daughters, Fulvia and Ludovica.

He died in Rome on 23 October 1953. His grandson was Carlo Ripa di Meana, an Italian politician and noble, who was the son of Fulvia.
