= Alice Galimberti =

Italian poet (1873–1936)

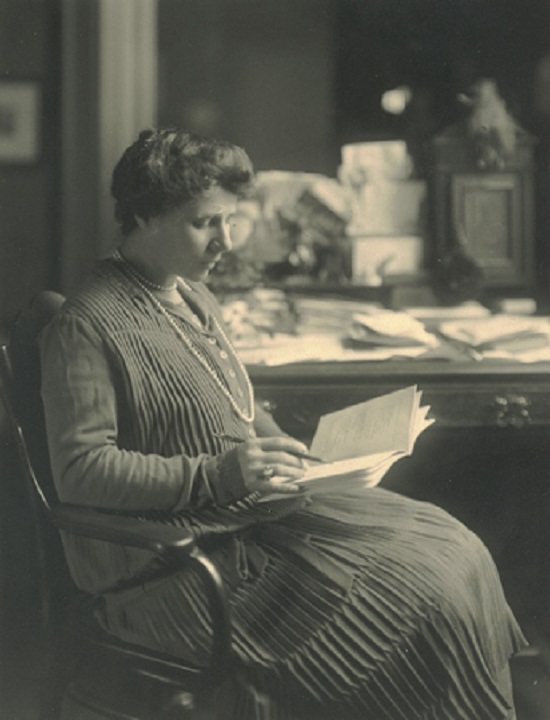
- Born: Alice Schanzer; 18 November 1873; Vienna, Austria-Hungary
- Died: 4 January 1936 (aged 62); Cuneo, Kingdom of Italy
- Education: Sapienza University of Rome
- Spouse: Tancredi Galimberti
- Writing career
- Language: Italian
- Notable work: L'aedo d'Italia: Algernon Charles Swinburne (1925)
- Notable awards: Rose Mary Crawshay Prize (1927)

Alice Galimberti (née Schanzer; 18 November 1873, in Vienna – 4 January 1936, in Cuneo) was an Italian poet, scholar of English literature, and art historian. She was a winner of the British Academy's Rose Mary Crawshay Prize in 1927 for her study of Swinburne.

== Life ==
Alice Schanzer was born in Vienna, third of four children of Luigi Schanzer, a financier, and Amalia Grunberg, a pianist. One of his brothers was Carlo Schanzer, a politician and jurist. Another brother, Ottone Schanzer, was a librettist and translator of Richard Strauss's works into Italian. A polyglot, she was fluent in German, Italian, French and English from childhood. She lived in Trieste, Milan and in Rome, where she attended high school and university. At La Sapienza she studied literature. She married Tancredi Galimberti, then Minister of Posts in the Zanardelli government, in 1902. The following year she moved with him to Cuneo, where their sons, Carlo Enrico and Tancredi (Duccio), were born.

In 1901, her first collection of verses Motivi e Canti appeared, praised by Giosuè Carducci. She began her studies of English literature, in particular the poetry of Swinburne, Watts-Dunton, and Spenser. In 1919 she started teaching language and English philosophy at the Faculty of Letters of the University of Messina. Her works on the Risorgimento and Giuseppe Mazzini were well-received. She also wrote on the Pre-Raphaelites and the Rossetti family. She contributed numerous essays to Adolfo Venturi's History of Italian art. She also published articles on Piedmontese artists - Bistolfi, Delleani, Grosso, Gaidano, Olivero - whose works she and her husband collected. Her important work on Edmund Spenser was published posthumously in 1938 by her son Duccio.

Galimberti maintained several set of diaries, covering not only her own personal life and moods, but also from the point of view of her children. She kept travel diaries, in particular that of her only trip to England - in 1933 - after a life spent studying English literature, which detailed her itineraries and the people she met - some of whom she had corresponded with for years but whom she hadn't personally known.

The Galimberti family archive in Cuneo, which she was primarily responsible for assembling, preserves documentation of her critical and literary activity and her dense network of relationships with Italian and foreign intellectuals.

Alice Galimberti died on 4 January 1936, after a brief illness.

== Selected works ==
- Il Romenticismo in Italia. Perugia: Tipografia Umbra. 1899.
- Motivi e canti. Bologna: Zanichelli. 1901.
- L'Ariosto inglese. Rome: Nuova Antologia. 1903.
- La Clitennestra medioevale. Rome: Nuova Antologia. 1908.
- Misticismo mazziniano. Rome: Nuova Antologia. 1912.
- L'ultimo dei Rossetti. Rome: Nuova Antologia. 1915.
- Giuseppe Mazzini nel pensiero inglese. Rome: Nuova Antologia. 1919.
- Dante nel pensiero inglese. Florence: Le Monnier. 1921.
- L'aedo d'Italia: Algernon Charles Swinburne. Rome: Sandron. 1925.
- Canti nell'ombra. Milano: Unitas. 1928.
- Luci mazziniane nel sindacalismo nazionale. Rome: Pensiero e azione. 1929.
- Canti di pace e canti di battaglia. Bologna: Zanichelli. 1931.
- Carducci in Inghilterra. Rome: Nuova Antologia. 1935.
- Edmondo Spenser l'"Ariosto inglese". Turin: Gambino. 1938.
- Franca Varallo, ed. (2007). Al limitare del sogno: poesie e scritti d'arte. Turin: Aragno. ISBN 9788884193261.

== Bibliography ==
- Mana, Emma (2002). "L'organizzazione della memoria come autobiografia familiare: l'archivio Galimberti tra Ottocento e Novecento". In Maria Luisa Betri (ed.). Scritture di desiderio e di ricordo. F. Angeli. ISBN 9788846440518.
- "Alice Galimberti Schanzer". Nino Aragno. 2007.
