= Ottone Schanzer =

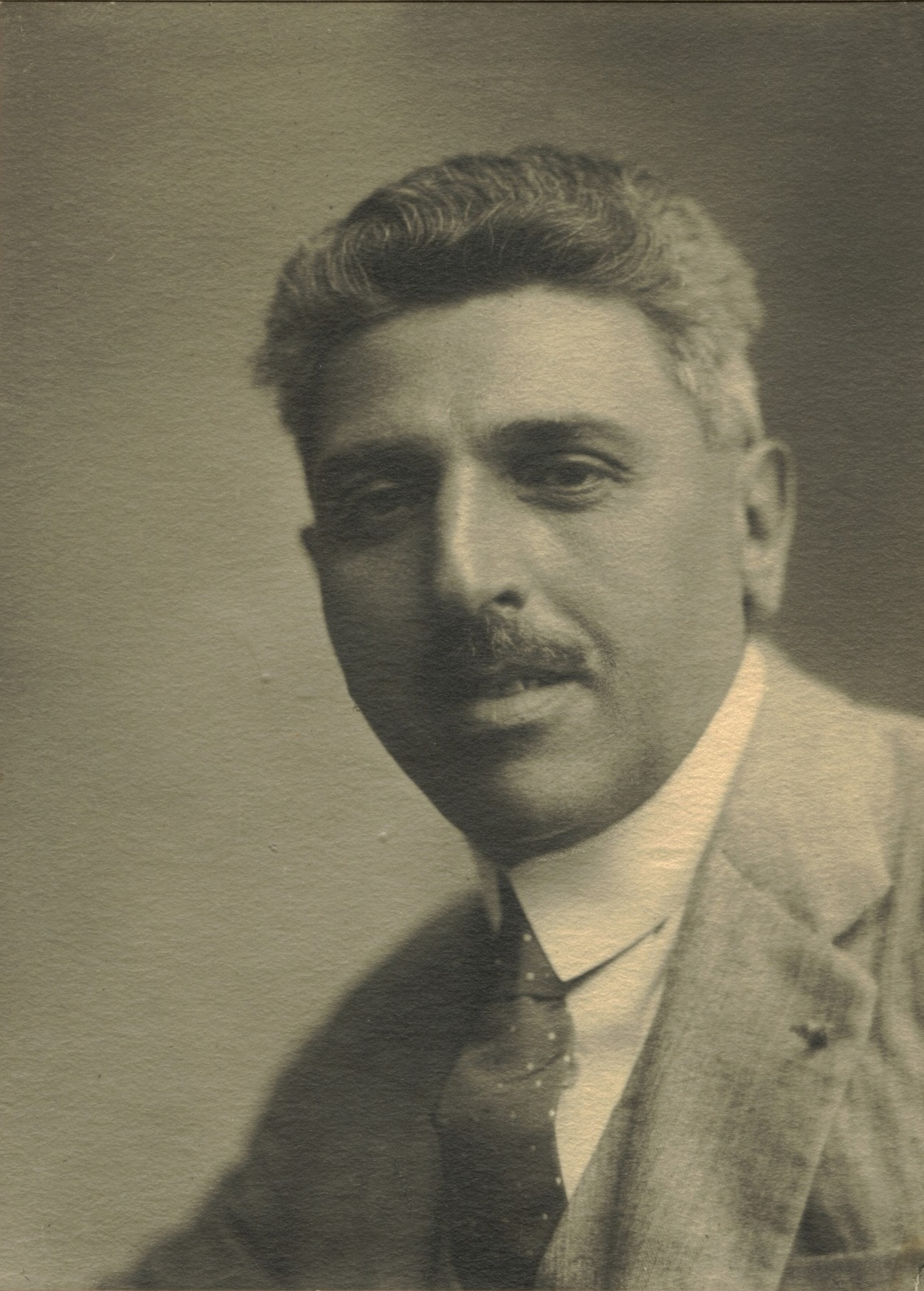
Ottone Schanzer in 1922

Ottone Schanzer (Vienna, 18 April 1877 - Rome, 2 February 1956) was an Austrian man of letters and librettist naturalised Italian. A ministerial official of the Kingdom of Italy, he is remembered for his translations from German into Italian of the librettos of operas by Richard Strauss.

== Life ==
Ottone Schanzer was born in Vienna on 18 April 1877, the son of Ludwig Schanzer (1832–1886), a lawyer by profession, and Amalia Pauline Grünberg (1845–1918), a pianist and pupil of Franz Liszt. The two married in 1863 and from their union were born Carlo (1865–1953), Roberto (1872–1954), Alice (1873–1936) and finally Otto. The family lived in Vienna until 1879 and later moved to Italy, first to Milan and shortly afterwards definitively to Rome. Ludwig and Amalia got to know each other in the Habsburg capital, where the Grünberg family, belonging to the middle-class bourgeoisie, was well known in Viennese society at the time. In fact, the Grünbergs were also distinguished by a keen interest in music: this predilection would allow Amalia to study with Franz Liszt and become an excellent pianist; Amalia's brother Eugen also distinguished himself first as a violinist with the Boston Symphony Orchestra and later as director of the New England Conservatory in the same American city.

After moving to Italy, his father would contribute financially to the land reclamation plans, coming into contact with prominent personalities such as Cesare Correnti and Giovanni Giolitti. In particular between the Schanzer family and the Giolitti family, a very solid relationship of friendship was created: the two ladies, Amalia and Rosa, used to frequent each other, the young ladies Alice Schanzer and Enrichetta Giolitti were close, and the two youngest sons Ottone Schanzer and Federico Giolitti spent their afternoons together between snacks and moments of leisure..

At the interest of his brother Carlo, Ottone was employed (1896) at the Library of the Ministry of Foreign Affairs. He enrolled in the Faculty of Law in Rome, graduated in 1903 and in the same year was hired by the General Inspectorate of Industry and Trade at the Ministry of Agriculture, Industry and Trade. He continued his career with various positions as a civil servant in numerous ministerial offices until his retirement in 1946: Ministry of the Colonies (1916), Ministry of the National Economy (1923), Ministry of Agriculture and Forestry (1929), Ministry of Corporations (1930), Ministry of Trade and Currency (1936), Ministry of Industry, Trade and Labour (1944), Ministry of Foreign Trade (1945).

Always passionate about literary and musical studies, Ottone devoted himself, in parallel to his work commitments, to writing poems, lyrics for music and wrote articles of literary and musical criticism in various Italian magazines. Particularly noteworthy, however, are his works on the translation of the librettos of Richard Strauss operas into Italian.

In addition to his 30-year collaboration with Richard Strauss, he also wrote texts for music for other composers, including Alberto Gasco and Bruno Barilli. For Alberto Gasco, he produced some lyrics that were later included in the miscellaneous collection Poems of Night and Dawn (1909) and entitled: Night, The Lullaby of the Little King, Ballad of a Distant Time, Meditation. Also for Gasco, Schanzer wrote Astrea - Visione mistica (1905) and La leggenda delle sette torri (1913), a libretto inspired by two paintings by Dante Gabriele Rossetti. For Bruno Barilli he wrote the three-act opera Medusa (1910–1913), from which Giannotto Bastianelli drew inspiration for a Sonata for violin and piano.

There are over one hundred letters - starting in 1903 - addressed by Ottone to the Galimberti family living in Cuneo and now preserved in the Museo Casa Galimberti in the Piedmontese capital. Ottone Schanzer always participated with closeness and affection in family events, including those related to the murder at the fascist hands of his nephew Duccio Galimberti, the martyr of the Italian resistance, son of his sister Alice Schanzer. Even years after that murder, on 30 April 1949, during a radio broadcast of the Funeral Concert for Duccio Galimberti, composed by Giorgio Federico Ghedini, Ottone was deeply moved by the fate of his nephew.

He died in Rome on 2 February 1956 and was buried in the Verano Cemetery.

== Translations of Richard Strauss librettos ==
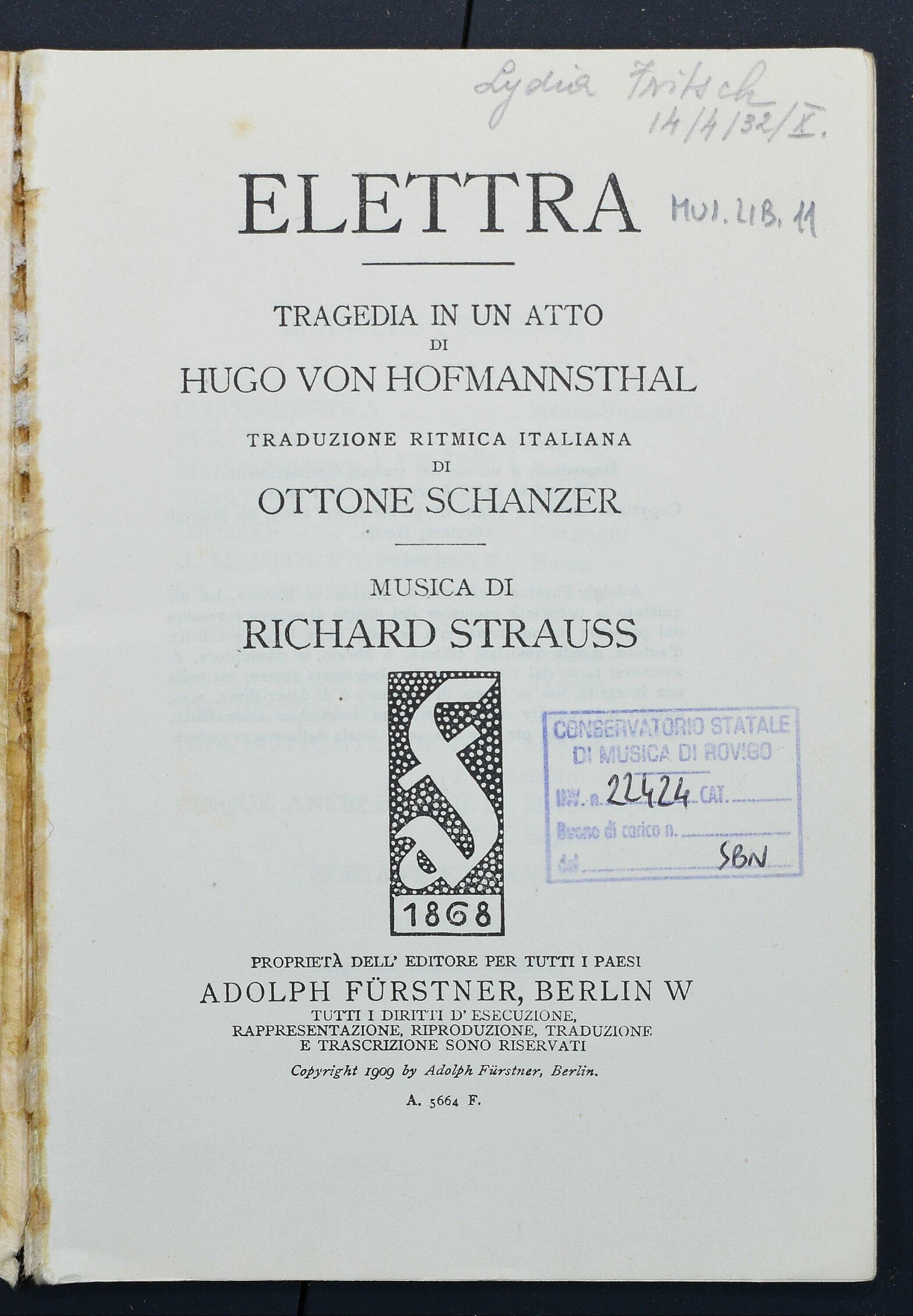
Elektra libretto with Italian translation by Ottone Schanzer

The collaboration between Richard Strauss and Ottone Schanzer lasted for thirty years. According to some scholars, the relationship between the two began in 1908, mediated the previous year by Ottone Schanzer's translation of Hugo von Hofmannsthal's Elektra. The latter, on 11 October 1907, reported to his sister Alice that he was very busy in those days with the translation of Hofmannsthal's Elektra, ‘a young writer very much in vogue in Austria and Germany and whom Ottone would have liked to make known in Italy as well. Instead, in a letter of February 1908, Strauss himself wrote to Hofmannsthal about his meeting in Rome with Ottone: ‘In Rome I spoke with Dr Schanzer, who has prepared the best translation of Elektra and is unable to publish it. Elektra is proceeding apace'. All of Schanzer's translations are rhythmic versions, i.e. they translate the quantitative rhythmic foot of German metrics into Italian accentuative metrics.

Listed below are the works by Richard Strauss with the respective publication date of the Italian translations by Ottone Schanzer:

- Feuersnot (1912)
- Salomè (1924)
- Elektra (1909)
- Der Rosenkavalier (1911)
- Ariadne auf Naxos (2. versione, 1925)
- Intermezzo (1925)
- Die ägyptische Helena (1928-1930)
- Arabella (1935)
- Die schweigsame Frau (1936)

== Works ==
- Ode a John Ruskin (1904)
- Le notti di Capri (1921)
- Astrea (1905)
- Poemi della notte e dell’aurora (1909)
- Beatrice Cenci (1910)
- Medusa (1910-1913)
- La leggenda delle Sette Torri (1913)
- Maurice Allou (1921)
- Un grande neoromantico tedesco Ernst Hardt (1928)

== Bibliography ==
- Bernagozzi, Daniela, Non mi parlar d’amore. La giovinezza di Alice Schanzer Galimberti, Cuneo, Primalpe, 2019.
- Mana, Emma (a cura di), Archivio Galimberti, Roma, Ministero per i Beni culturali e ambientali, Ufficio centrale per i Beni archivistici, 1992.
- Marchetti, Giulia, La miglior traduzione di Elektra. Ottone Schanzer (1877-1956) traduttore delle opere di Richard Strauss. Dalle fonti dell’Archivio Museo Casa Galimberti di Cuneo, diss., rel. Raffaele Deluca, Rovigo, Conservatorio, 2025.
- Alfred Mathis. "Stefan Zweig As Librettist and Richard Strauss-II." Music & Letters, vol. 25, no. 4, 1944, pp. 226–45. JSTOR, http://www.jstor.org/stable/728333. Accessed 26 Jan. 2025.

== Related pages ==
- Alice Schanzer
- Richard Strauss
- Giorgio Federico Ghedini
- Hugo von Hofmannsthal
