= Dante Livio Bianco =

Italian partisan and lawyer

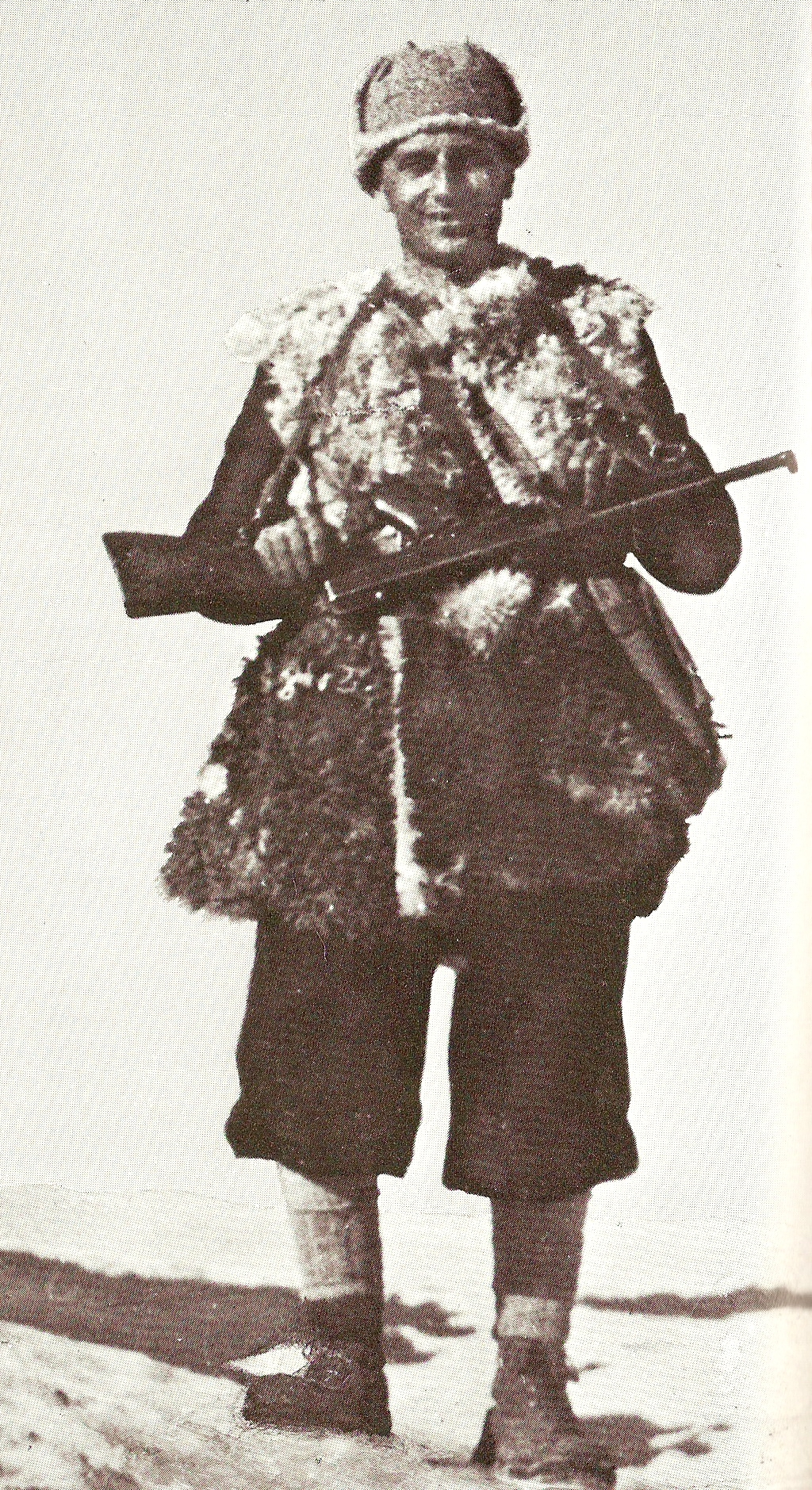
- 1944/45
- Born: Dante Livio Marcel Angelo Nikin Robert André Bianco; 19 May 1909; Cannes, Alpes-Maritimes (06), France
- Died: 12 July 1953 (aged 44); Valle Gesso (”Alpi Maritimi”), Piedmont, Italy
- Occupations: Civil lawyer War-time partisan leader (more briefly) Politician
- Political party: "Justice and Liberty" / "Giustizia e Libertà" "Action Party" / "Partito d'Azione"
- Spouse: Giuseppina Felicita Maria "Pinella" Ventre (1910-1959)
- Parents: Gioachino Filippo Bianco (1859-1918) (father); Prospera "Rina" Sartore (1885-1969) (mother)
- Awards: Silver Medal of Military Valor (twice)

Dante Livio Bianco (19 May 1909 – 12 July 1953) achieved early distinction among legal professionals as an exceptionally able Italian civil lawyer, and then came to wider prominence as a wartime partisan leader. He was awarded the Silver Medal of Military Valor twice. He survived the war but nevertheless died at a relatively young age due to a climbing accident.

== Biography ==
=== Provenance and early years ===
Dante Livio Marcel Angelo Nikin Robert André Bianco was born at Cannes on the southern coast of France, a short distance to the west of Nice. He was the first-born of his parents’ three recorded children, but in 1914 his sister Lydia died in infancy through suffocating on a bean, so that from 1914 until the birth of his brother Alberto in 1917 (1917–1997) he was his parents’ only child. Cannes had grown rapidly in extent and wealth during the final decades of the nineteenth century, largely on account of the European tourism boom triggered by industrialisation and the resulting increase in leisure spending. Gioachino Bianco (1859–1918), his father, had moved to Cannes from the family's home base at Valdieri, a small town set in the mountains on the western edge of Piedmont. Like many of his family Gioachino Bianco was skilled in the craft of tailoring, and he arrived in Cannes equipped both with his tailoring skills and with significant entrepreneurial flair, which would enable him to become a leading member of the town's business community and the proprietor of several retail outlets. Livio's mother, Prospera "Rina" Sartore (1885–1969), is celebrated by admirers for the fortitude she displayed in bringing up her sons after she was widowed in 1918. In material terms, she was left well provided for, and there were also a number of supportive relatives in Italy. Two decades earlier Gioachino Bianco had arranged for the construction of a large villa in his home town of Valdieri, to which Rina Sartore now moved with her sons, and it was here that Livio Bianco spent the second half of his childhood and attended elementary school. When the time came to move on to secondary school he was sent to a boarding school in Cuneo. The boarding arrangement soon gave way to an arrangement that involved living during school days with the family of Giovanni Quaranta, who had been a friend of his father's and who in 1908 had married Domenica Sartore, who was sister to Livio's mother. The Quaranta sons, who attended the same school as Livio Bianco, were therefore first cousins to the Bianco brothers.

=== Student years ===
On completing his schooling he enrolled at the University of Turin, where he studied for a degree in Jurisprudence. Mussolini had taken power when Livio Bianco was 13, and during his teenage years in the 1920s the institutionalised brutality of Fascist tyranny had become progressively more apparent. At the Law faculty in Turin he was taught and powerfully influenced by men such as Francesco Ruffini, Luigi Einaudi and Gioele Solari. Long before he received his degree in 1930 Bianco had, like many of his student contemporaries at Turin, become committed to the Gobetti legacy and thereby a staunch antifascist. A feature of life in Mussolini's Italy was the pervasive application by the government and its agencies if street violence as a tool of social control. Some of it was organised from the top: some of it was more quietly “accepted” by the state. In 1928 Bianco was one of a small group of students caught up in trying to defend the Senator (and former University of Turin Law Professor ) Francesco Ruffini when he faced a serious physical assault from the Turin University Fascist Group. Ruffini was targeted because he had opposed the government in the senate over the ticklish business of reforming the electoral system. Bianco was badly injured in the attack. Some sources indicate that his injuries took him close to death. The experience was important in hardening his anti-fascist convictions. One of the few fellow students who joined him in attempting to defend the senator from the fascist students thugs was Alessandro Galante Garrone: Galante Garrone and Livio Bianco later became lifelong friends and allies.

=== Lawyer ===
After graduating under the tutorial supervision of Gioele Solari, Livio Bianco embarked on a legal career, working initially in Cuneo. From 1932/33, having evidently completed any necessary apprenticeship qualification, he worked and exercised his advocacy skills in the district at Turin, while employed at the legal practice run by the youthful Manlio Brosio. Brosio would subsequently make a considerable mark in the world international politics, notably as Secretary General of NATO between 1964 and 1971. He had also been a close friend of Piero Gobetti, a government opponent whose death in 1926 following a fascist beating had been widely reported at the time. The spirit of the firm, and indeed across much of the Turin middle class establishment, was antifascist.

=== Wartime resistance ===
In a frequently referenced speech which he delivered during 1948 in the presence of President Einaudi, Livio Bianco sought to summarize, in the rhetorical style of his profession and of the postwar optimism of those times, how the spirit of antifascist resistance had underpinned partisan opposition to fascism and, after 1943, to German occupation between 1943 and 1945.

’Mr.President, through your own intimate knowledge of the history of Piedmont you will recall the defiant reply that King Victor Amadeo gave when emissaries from [the French king] Louis XIV who tried to persuade him that the state of his army would deprive him of any chance of resisting the powerful [French] armies from beyond the Alps. ”I will need only to stamp my foot on the soil, and soldiers of every class will appear”. So it was on 8 September [1943] and the days that followed in Cuneo and the surrounding district, just like that: soldiers, that is to say partisan fighters, appeared from every side, because someone or something had stamped with a foot on then soil. But this was not the foot of any ruler, king or prince: rather a higher and more potent force was on play. I refer to what can be termed civil conscience, the national call, and the sense of higher values: in short, I mean that sense of supreme virtues which may linger underground and invisible for a long time, but still breaks through at decisive moments, and propel an entire people into not falling short when the hour of historical duty arrives.'

Dante Livio Bianco, 18 September 1948

"Signor Presidente, Lei che tanto bene conosce la storia del Piemonte, ricorderà la fiera risposta data da Vittorio Amedeo II agli emissari di Luigi XIV i quali gli spiegavano come le condizioni del suo esercito gli togliessero ogni possibilità di resistere alle potenti armate d'oltralpe: «Batterò col piede la terra, e n'usciran soldati d'ogni banda». Ebbene, l'8 settembre, e in seguito, a Cuneo e intorno a Cuneo avvenne proprio così: i soldati, cioè i partigiani uscivano da ogni parte, perché qualcuno aveva battuto col piede la terra; ma non era stato un sovrano, re o principe che fosse, bensì una forza più alta e maestosa, quella che si chiama la coscienza civile, la vocazione nazionale, il senso dei valori supremi, quella essenziale virtù insomma, che, magari sotterranea ed invisibile per lungo volgere di anni, erompe nei momenti decisivi, e spinge un popolo a non mancare nell'ora del dovere storico."

Dante Livio Bianco, 18 September 1948

When war broke out north of the Alps in September 1939, the Italian government avoided military involvement just as it had done in 1914. As in 1914, however, the country came under intense international pressure to participate. In June 1940 a short-lived Italian invasion of France, though militarily inconsequential in itself, marked the beginning of military engagement, this time alongside Germany. In July 1942, when the so-called Action Party was formed, Livio Bianco joined it. According to some sources, he was among its founders in the important Turin region. The party was created by men of the intellectual centre-left who saw themselves an heirs to the political legacy of Carlo Rosselli and Piero Gobetti. It was both a reaction against fascism among men who would never have supported Mussolini and a response to a growing feeling across society more generally that the leader's increasingly personalised alliance with Germany had placed the nation on the road to disaster. As the military situation deteriorated, towards the end of July 1943 the king had Mussolini arrested. Seven weeks later, on 8 September 1943, news emerged of an armistice signed between the new Italian government and Major General Walter Bedell Smith on behalf of the Anglo-American armies advancing from the south. Central and northern Italy remained under German military control. Four days after the news of the armistice surfaced, German forces rescued Mussolini from the mountain-top hotel in which he was being detained and installed him as the “ruler” in a puppet state corresponding, for the most part, with those parts of Italy still under German military control. In Cuneo these were trigger events for Livio Bianco and his called Action Party comrade, Duccio Galimberti. On 11 September 1943 there took place the first recorded meeting of a partisan group in Italy. The location for the meeting was Livio Bianco's family home in the remote border town of Valdieri. The men present were Livio Bianco, Duccio Galimberti and ten of their friends. The group took the name "Italia Libera" (‘’”Free Italy”’’) for their group of fighting men, and made their way into the mountains above Cuneo. Livio Bianco had become an enthusiastic recreational mountaineer whole working as a lawyer in Turin, and was already familiar with the terrain. Initially travelling on horseback they made their way to the first secret base of what became the Cuneo “Justice and Liberty” Alpine Division. Their chosen location was marked by the little Madonna del Colletto sanctuary, between the Valle Gesso and the Valle Stura, high mountain valleys, positioned approximately halfway between Cuneo and the French frontier. The base was suitably inaccessible to motorised transport, especially during the winter months. They moved on a week later to Paral(o)up, further up the Valle Stura, later to San Matteo on the Valle Grana. Numbers quickly increased as new volunteers joined and other partisan teams emerged in the area, accompanied by a coming together of the groupings. They were engaged in harsh warfare against German troops and Italian fascist forces, roundups and arrests, capture and, as the Germans progressively withdrew, retention of some valleys, but also at other times temporary withdrawals across to the Langhe hills beyond Cuneo to the north, or indeed in the other direction, across the border into France. By the end of 1944 the partisans were holding a large number of German prisoners in their mountain retreats.

From the launch of the operation, Livio Bianco stood out as one of the principal drivers and organisers of the expanding network of Alpine partisans units. Despite a total absence of previous military experience, after m1945 he was commended by admirers for the formidable military efficiency he was able to instil and the passionate regional loyalties which he was able to access and enhance from then ingrained instincts of comrades. Among those under his command he also acquired a reputation as an uncompromising disciplinarian, determined that adventurers and profiteers should not be numbered among his men. There are reports that he did not hesitate to order the shooting of any thieves who might otherwise compromise the reputational integrity of the partisan brigades. During the spring of 1944, he was placed in charge of the “Carlo Roselli” partisan brigade, operating as before in the Cuneese Mountains. Another member of the brigade was Nuto Revelli. Something of Livio Bianco's attitude at this time can be inferred from the title of an article he contributed to a partisan newspaper, “Aria, luce, pulizia”. He was appalled that the possibility that the Italian Social Republic, dominated by a Hitlerite Germany might become a permanent fixture with all the dark fascist inhumanity that had become the underlying context for life in post-democratic Vichy France since 1940. In his article he warned of Italy becoming permanently “flaccid, sluggish, and without confidence or legitimacy” ("fiacca, lenta e dubitosa") as the price to be paid if the war were to end with anything less than a total decisive defeat for fascism, whether home grown or imposed from Berlin.

Livio Bianco was also among those taking a lead in pushing for contacts between antifascist partisan fighters in Italy and Résistance groups across the border in France. These culminated in a meeting between representatives of the two organisations at Barcelonette on 22 May 1944 at which Livio Bianco and Galimberto led the Italian delegation: Livio Bianco led the negotiations. The French side was led by Jacques Lécuyer. The process culminated in the signing on 30/31 May 1944 of the Saretto Agreements (“Patti di Saretto"), committing the parties to support continuing solidarity between the French and Italian people, politically and in the fight against Nazism.

In December 1944, following the betrayal and killing of Duccio Galimberti, Livio Bianco came down from the mountains and replaced his dead comrade as regional commander of the “Justice and Liberty” brigade for the entire Piedmontese region. (There were by this time “Justice and Liberty” brigades, battling what remained of the fascist state structures and the slowly diminishing military effectiveness of Mussolini's German backers, across most of occupied Italy.)

=== After the war ===
War ended, formally, with the German Surrender of Caserta at the end of April 1945, by which time remaining German military units in the north had already been cut off from their ammunition and other supplies for some weeks. Further to the south, in Rome politician in the (previously secret) National Liberation Committee had been working on Italy's post-war future since the liberation of Rome in June 1944. Livio Bianco had never shown much appetite for political involvement, but his wartime fame led to calls by Action Party comrades for him to accept a seat as a party nominee to the National Council, a provisional legislature which remained in existence till elections could be called: that happened in June 1946. He agreed to serve in the National Council, but did not pursue a political career after 1946, instead rebuilding his career, based in Turin, as one of the top civil lawyers in Italy. He sustained a public profile, however, keen to preserve and share the idealism that had inspired him as an antifascist resistance leader during the 1940s (and not infrequently critical of developments in national politics during the 1950s).

In 1953 Livio Bianco campaigned in support of "Unità Popolare" (UA), a short lived political party of the centre-left created by the former prime minister Ferruccio Parri with support from members of the old wartime Action Party. In the immediate term, "Unità Popolare" represented a response to government efforts to build permanent electoral distortions (by means of the so-called "legge truffa" / “scam law”) into the electoral system that would have disproportionately favoured the Christian Democratic party. These threats to electoral fairness triggered such widespread outrage within the political class that it was never implemented, but the "Unità Popolare" party failed dismally to gain traction with voters, gaining less than 1% of the votes cast in the 1953 general election. But according to some commentators, both in parliament and in the media, support for and pressure from the UA nevertheless contributed powerfully to terminally discrediting the “scam law” before it could be implemented.

=== Death and celebration ===
A passionate mountaineer from an early age, on 12 July 1953 Dante Livio Bianco was killed in a climbing accident while ascending the “Cima di Saint Robert” from the Valle Gesso in the "Alpi Maritimi", south-west of Cuneo and on the Italian side of the Franco-Italian frontier. Following his death, tributes to his memory flowed: a main street in Valdierei was renamed in celebration of his life, and in Turin, close to the city's iconic Fiat factory a wide avenue with a shopping parade on one side and ample space for car parking was renamed “Piazza Dante Livio Bianco”. The body was returned to Valdieri where it was buried with appropriate quiet pomp in the local cemetery: Ferruccio Parri delivered a eulogy on behalf of his partisan comrades, many of whom attended the ceremony. The memorial that might have pleased him most, however, was constructed only in 1963, ten years after his death, and has renovated on a number of occasions since. This is a simple but robust refuge hut, located close to the mountain on which Livio Bianco died, slightly less than two kilometers above sea level, and able to accommodate approximately fifty mountaineers in a combination of dormitories and rooms. There are toilets – both indoor and outdoor – along with provision for room heating, hot water and a land-line telephone. During the closed season it is still possible to access basic accommodation for up to fourteen people.

After his death, Livio Bianco's Turin legal practice was taken over by Carlo Galante Garrone, the younger brother of Livio Bianco's friend and, back in the 1920s, student contemporary.
