= Tancredi Galimberti =

Italian politician

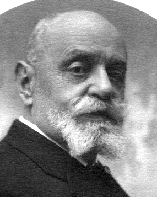
- Born: 25 July 1856; Cuneo, Piedmont, Kingdom of Sardinia
- Died: 1 August 1939 (aged 83); Cuneo, Piedmont, Italy
- Education: Rome; Turin
- Occupations: Newspaper proprietor Lawyer; Politician; Member of parliament Senator
- Spouse: Alice Schanzer (1873–1936)
- Children: 1. Carlo Enrico Galimberti (1904–1974); 2. Tancredi "Duccio" Galimberti (1906–1944)

Tancredi Galimberti (25 July 1856 – 1 August 1939) was an Italian politician during the first part of the twentieth century. He served as Minister for Postal and Telegraphic communications in the Zanardelli government between 1901 and 1903. In 1929, despite being openly equivocal about the leader's post-democratic approach to politics, he was appointed to the senate.

== Biography ==
=== Provenance and early years ===
Tancredi Galimberti was born in Cuneo, a midsized town and important regional capital in the hills south of Turin. He was the eleventh of his parents' fourteen recorded children. His father, Bartolomeo Galimberti, was a typographer by trade and something of a "self-made man" by temperament. Bartolomeo Galimberti grew prosperous and became in 1861 the proprietor of "Sentinella delle Alpi". Family control of this politically pro-liberal and openly pro-masonic newspaper would be helpful in his future political career.

Galimberti received a classical college education from the Scolopi ("Piarist") fathers in nearby Savona and then progressed to university, studying first at Rome where he became involved with republican groups. He moved on to the University of Turin, emerging in 1880 with a degree in Jurisprudence.

=== Member of parliament ===
In 1882 he became a co-director of the family newspaper, of which he was now proprietor. The "Sentinella delle Alpi" was to prove a powerful springboard for a rapid rise in what at least one commentator terms a "brilliant" political career. In 1883, aged just 26, he was elected to the Cuneo municipal council. Just one year later he was elected to the Provincial Council for the entire Valgrana district. On 3 July 1887 he became a member of the Chamber of Deputies (the lower house of the national parliament), having been elected by the Cuneo electoral district with the public endorsement of Giovanni Giolitti, already a powerful politician locally and a future head of the Italian government. Giolitti's backing had been secured through then intervention of N.Vineis, a co-director of the "Sentinella" and another man of significant influence in the region.

He sat as a member of parliament, representing the Cuneo electoral district, without a break between 1887 and 1913. He was initially very close to his fellow Cunean, Giolitti. When the Giolitti government collapsed in the wake of the 1893 Banca Romana scandal, Galimberti even took a lead in defending Giolitti before the High Court. In personal terms he would remain close to Giolitti, but in political terms he was never an uncritical follower. Over the years he would not infrequently take positions in parliament and in his newspaper that respected the left-wing ethos that was baked into Cuneo's liberal traditions, and frequently redolent of the far-left radicalism associated with the eloquent firebrand, Felice Cavallotti. When he entered parliament he was seen as a supporter of the government then in office under Agostino Depretis. Over the ensuing quarter century Giolitti's position shifted in a more reformist direction, and the Galimberti increasingly found himself on the same side as his friend.

Throughout his time as a member of parliament, Galimberti prioritised the interests of voters in Cuneo. Many of his parliamentary interventions were in favour of public investment in infrastructure and other "public works and services" in the Province of Cuneo, and of any other measures that might improve the living conditions of Cuneo residents. An enduring case in point was the railway line linking Cuneo to Ventimiglia (and thereby to Nice), along with a fine new main station at Cuneo-Altipiano (the station building was subsequently replaced by a more bombastic edifice in 1937). It should nevertheless be stressed that his commitment to his local electors did nothing to diminish the extent and thoughtfulness of his parliamentary contributions on the major national issues of the day. His default position was in favour of "economic rigour". He nevertheless opposed the application repressive measures to try and resolve the social issues that were coming to the fore in the context of Italy's rapid industrialisation. He opposed colonial expansion and, on the nearer international front, favoured closer co-operation with France.

=== Rudini government, Pelloux government ===
Though politically damaged – at least in the immediate term – by the Banca Romana scandal, Giovanni Giolitti retained huge influence with senior colleagues on the national stage. Early in 1896, describing Galimberti as a man of "great influence in the Province of Cuneo", Giolitti recommended his friend for inclusion in the Rudinì government. On 10 March 1896 Tancredi Galimberti was included in the new government as Undersecretary in the Ministry for Public Education. He was, understandably, seen by some as "one of Giolitti's men" in the government, which lasted only for slightly more than four months. Galimberti nevertheless retained his post in the successor government (which was also led by the Marquess of Rudinì), remaining in office till October 1897 when his minister also resigned.

While Rudinì remained in power Galimberti remained broadly supportive of the government. It can be misleading to apply terms from Anglo-American party politics to Italian national politics during this period, but subject to the caveat that Italian politics were less rigidly structured according to party-political branding, it is not unreasonable to see Rudinì as a figure of the moderate right. The 1897 Italian grain harvest was a poor one at a time when world prices for American grain were surging because of the Spanish–American War. Tariff reductions in January 1898 were widely seen as "too little too late": the Rudini government fell in response to a rapid crescendo in street disturbances not just in the south, but also in the north of Italy. General Pelloux took over, with another new government in June 1898 following a violent police response in Milan to food riots, whereby several thousand were injured and approximately 80 people were killed. Pelloux restored order without recourse to an overt system of full-blown martial law, helped by a better harvest, and demonstrating considerable political dexterity. His government coalition included members from the moderate left, but it also contained other military men, and is widely judged by historians to have been a conservative and militarist "law and order" administration. In parliament Tancredi Galimberti opposed the Pelloux government, arguing powerfully that it was the paucity of "social legislation" that was feeding socialist propaganda in the cities and clerical hostility to the government across the country.

=== Minister for Posts and Telecommunications ===
The 1900 general election signalled a notable rise in Galimberti's political influence, and he felt able to turn down the offer to join the short-lived Saracco government coalition as Minister for Agriculture. However, when the Zanardelli government was announced on 15 February 1901, it was apparent that Tancredi Galimberti had accepted an appointment as Minister for Postal and Telegraphic communications. At this stage he was still being identified in sources as one of the "Giolittiani". That would change over the next couple of years.

Galimberti's time in charge at the Posts and Telecommunications ministry lasted till November 1903. It turned out to be the pinnacle of his political career. During this period significant differences in approach surfaced between Galimberti and his mentor, Giovanni Giolitti. Giolitti proved unforgiving, and without his backing Galimberti's political fortunes fell into an unstoppable decline, at least while Giovanni Giolitti remained a towering political presence in Italy. (Note: Giovanni Giolitti died on 17 July 1928.)

The Italian government in power between 1901 and 1903 is known as the Zanardelli government, but in many ways it was a government with two leaders. One was Giuseppe Zanardelli, who was terminally ill. Giovanni Giolitti, serving as the Interior Minister was the other one. In June 1903 Giolitti resigned from the government. He may have been impatient to take over from Giuseppe Zanardelli as President of the Council of Ministers (Note: English-language sources tend to use the term "prime minister" to identify the job, but that is not a direct translation of "Presidente del Consiglio dei ministri", the title given to the Italian head of government under the Italian constitution, and in some ways the lazy anglophone translation misrepresents Italian government structure) As a leading member of the "Giolittiani", Galimberti was evidently expected to follow Giolitti's example promptly. He did not do so. As matters turned out Giolitti, suffered the indignity of having to await the death of the incumbent before the king invited him to form a new government. Zanardelli died on 3 November 1903. At the Ministry for Posts and Telecommunications Tancredi Galimberti was succeeded (albeit only briefly) by the poet-politician Enrico Stelluti Scala. Galimberti would never again hold ministerial office.

During this period, in 1902 Tancredi Galimberti married Alice Schanzer (1873–1936). The bride was the daughter of a financier who was also a friend of Giovanni Giolitti. Her family came from Vienna, but the marriage formalities and ceremony took place in Rome.

=== Troubles and career reversals ===
In 1904, following a parliamentary investigation, the former minister Nunzio Nasi was threatened with arrest on charges of embezzlement. Nasi reacted by escaping to France and later to England. Nasi's backers – of whom there were many – insisted that he was guilty of nothing more sinister than helping himself to some of the contents of the ministerial stationery cupboard, and that the whole thing was a political pantomime orchestrated by political rivals. Either way, for a time around 1906 and 1907 the affair assumed the proportions of a scandal comparable to the Banca Romana scandal of 1893. As the matter snowballed, Galimberti found himself on the periphery of the "Nasi Affair", accused of offences relating to his period as Undersecretary for Public Education. Nothing came of those accusations. One striking aspect of it that nevertheless stood out was the failure of Giolitti to make any move in defence of his former parliamentary ally: the contrast with Galimberti's reaction over Giolitti's troubles with the Banca Romana a dozen years earlier was starkly visible.

Recurring political themes in Italy during the first decade of the twentieth century on which Galimberti had conventionally "liberal" views included anticlericalism and "Laïcité" (which involved enshrining separation between church and state in the country's constitution and laws). Galimberti's instincts drew him towards secularist solutions. But anticlericalism could easily be presented by opponents as sympathy for socialism, which was still an anathema to mainstream politicians and many middle class electors. Ahead of the election of the March 1909 general election he made a calculated effort to distance himself from Giolitti, presenting himself as an advocate of an informal alliance with moderate catholic voters, necessary to dissuade the liberal-conservative voters in Cuneo from voting for the emerging Socialist Party. As a personal electoral strategy it worked: it was almost certainly because he received the votes of large numbers of moderate and even moderately conservative catholic voters in the small towns and villages of the Cuneo electoral district that, for the eighth general election in succession, Galimberti was once again elected to membership of the Chamber of Deputies. Nevertheless, it cut across the shifting strategy of Giolitti, a former and future head of government who appreciated "loyalty", and who had recently been trying to find a modus vivendi with at least the "more moderate" elements in the Socialist Party. Galimberti's electoral strategy in Cuneo was at best a distraction, cementing his status as a "renegade Giolittiano".

Confirmation, were it necessary, of the depth of the rupture between Galimberti and Giolitti came on 9 April 1911 when Giolitti sought a vote of confidence in another new government. Alarmed, he said, by the parliamentary preponderance of Giolitti's broadly based centre-left coalition, he voted against the formal confidence motion in it. In 1912 he led parliamentary opposition to the government's innovative and controversial creation of a nationalised life insurance monopoly.

=== Electoral defeat in 1913 ===
A particularly important piece of legislation in 1912 was an electoral reform extending the right to vote to all men aged 30, without any restrictions such as the old literacy test. The right to vote was further extended to all men aged 21 and above whose income had reached a certain threshold, or who had completed elementary schooling successfully or who had undertaken military service. The number of men entitled to vote had been more than doubled, from 3½ million to more than 8 million. The October 1913 General Election was the first to be conducted with the widened franchise. In Cuneo this diluted the voting weight of the groups who had become Galimberti's core voters during the previous quarter century. He also faced, in Marcello Soleri, a young energetic opponent whose liberal convictions and credentials created an overlap between the electoral appeal of the two men. Marcello Soleri had already served briefly as Mayor of Cuneo and was well known in the town. Ominously, Soleri was a loyal Giolittiano. Loyalty was mutual.

If he was to win the election for a ninth time Galimberti would need to retain the support of large numbers of local catholic voters with whom he had forged close links over many years. Without unforeseen interventions these would undoubtedly have continued to support him in a contest against Soleri, whose extensive political and social network was comparatively secular and "modern" in character. Galimberti could also continue to rely on strong masonic support, which was important Cuneo and the network of villages in the region. That might have been enough to secure electoral success for Galimberti had it not been for a direct intervention from Giolittiano with Count Gentiloni, a leader of "Catholic Action", a recently launched and rapidly expanding group dedicated to reversing recent declines in the political influence of the church. In 1913 Gentiloni concluded a pact with Giovanni Giolitti which was intended to swing Catholic voters behind Giolitti's coalition in the forthcoming election. With the church under the direction of a deeply conservative pope since 1903, this would strengthen any Giolitti government's hand in the intensifying struggle against a shared enemy: Socialism. Despite the announcement of the pact, it would have been a step too far for Count Gentiloni to persuade the voters of Cuneo to back Marcello Soleri in a straight contest against Tancredi Galimberti. That was not necessary for Galimberti to lose, however. It was only necessary that catholic voters should be persuaded to abstain, which they did in large numbers.

=== Opposition from the wilderness ===
The loss of his parliamentary seat, and Giolitti's pivotal role in securing it, intensified the personal animosity between the two men. At the same time Galimberti drew closer to the socialism of Gaetano Salvemini, becoming a regular contributor to L'Unità, a weekly magazine which Salvemini had launched a couple of years earlier. (Note: The weekly magazine L'Unità, published between 1911 and 1920, had little in common, other than its name, with the pro-communist daily newspaper L'Unità founded in 1924 by Antonio Gramsci.) When the great European powers went to war in July/August 1914, Galimberti emerged as a fervent interventionist. Although the Italian government held back from joining in with the war, correctly concluding that Italy was hopelessly unprepared for such a venture, on Galimberti's home turf in Piedmont a deeply embedded awareness of the colonial legacy of Austria-Hungary in northern Italy, meant that the idea entering the war on the opposite side to the Austrians was a popular one. Coincidentally it also placed Galimberti in opposition to Giolitti's resolute rejection of interventionism.

Despite the popularity, at least for a few years, of his interventionist advocacy, Galimberti was unable to gain the level of financial and political support that would have been necessary to return him to the Chamber of Deputies. Among the more thoughtful of his once loyal catholic backers, many were indeed appalled by his enthusiasm for war. Nevertheless, in 1915, when Italy did indeed join the war, it was indeed in support of the French and therefore in breach of longstanding Italian treaty commitments. The Italian government had found the British territorial promises more enticing than anything the Germans had to offer. One result among many of Italian participation in the war was that the next general election did not take place till the end of 1919, by which time the social, economic and political context was undergoing significant transformation. This time Galimberti stood for election in Cuneo as a candidate representing a locally based party of "autonomous independent farmers" (Partito agrario autonomo indipendente), a semi-detached element in the Italian Agrarian Party. In the post-war turbulence of the times, the party succeeded in sending a member to the Chamber of Deputies, but they only attracted enough votes to provide for one member, and the name at the top of their party list for Cuneo was not that of Tancredi Galimberti.

=== Fascist Italy ===
During the confused post-war years Galimberti appeared to settle his differences with Giolitti, but any rapprochement proved short-lived. He was associated briefly with some of the grandees of "liberalism", including Antonio Salandra and Francesco Saverio Nitti, before retreating into a period of political isolation. For the first time in more than thirty years, a General election was held in 1921 in which Tancredi Galimberti was not a candidate.

After 1922 it was clear to many that for the foreseeable future, Italy's destiny lay with the Fascists. Through Cesare Maria De Vecchi Galimberti began to move towards Fascism. He could see Mussolini as a defender of order and of the state, while at the same time deploring the Fascist deployment of violence and casual assaults on the constitutional order as political tools. He used the "Sentinella delle Alpi" to condemn the March on Rome at some length.

Galimberti's failure to keep his reservations about the methods of Fascism to himself was undoubtedly an element in the disappointing omission of his name from the National List (of parliamentary candidates) in the 1924 General Election. Consolation came five years later, however, when he accepted nomination to The Senate.

Tancredi Galimberti's final years were not spent as an activist senator. He devoted his time, instead, to studying the "Risorgimento", while supporting himself by means of his legal work. He died at Cuneo on 1 August 1939.

== Personal ==
Tancredi Galimberti married the poet and literature scholar Alice Schanzer (1873–1936) in Rome in 1902. The couple's sons, Carlo Enrico Galimberti, who became and engineer, and Tancredi Galimberti (always known as "Duccio"), a lawyer, a consistent anti-fascist and, after 1940, a partisan, were born respectively in 1904 and 1906.
