= Giuseppe Perotti =

Italian general and Resistance member

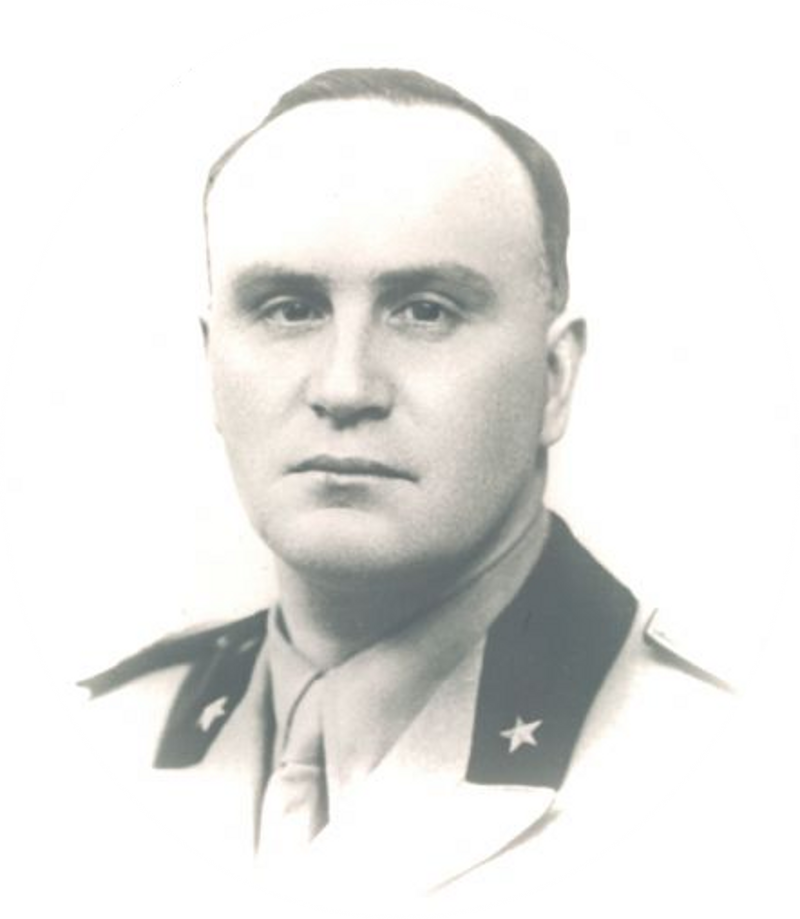
- Born: 16 June 1895; Turin, Kingdom of Italy
- Died: 5 April 1944 (aged 48); Turin, Italian Social Republic
- Military career
- Allegiance: Kingdom of Italy
- Branch: Royal Italian Army
- Service years: 1915–1943
- Rank: Brigadier General
- Commands: Railway Troops Regiment
- Conflicts: World War I; Battle of Caporetto; Second Italo-Ethiopian War; World War II; Italian Civil War
- Awards: Gold Medal of Military Valor (posthumous); Bronze Medal of Military Valor

Giuseppe Perotti (16 June 1895 – 5 April 1944) was an Italian general and Resistance member in World War II.

== Biography ==
Born in Turin to a railway official, after completing higher studies in physics and mathematics Perotti entered the Military Academy of Artillery and Engineers in his hometown, where he graduated second in his course. He then participated in the First World War with the rank of second lieutenant in the mining units of the engineering corps of the Royal Italian Army. During the retreat that followed the battle of Caporetto he was entrusted with the task of blowing up the bridges over the Piave river, for which he was awarded a Bronze Medal of Military Valor and promotion to captain for war merits.

After the war he became an instructor at the Military Academy of Turin for three years, then he decided to interrupt his military career in order to graduate in civil engineering at the Polytechnic of Turin. Upon returning to service, he was appointed head of the mountain works section at the Army Corps Engineering Directorate and subsequently assigned to the Fortifications Office, working to improve the defensive line along the Italian border with France. He then taught military construction at the School of Application of Artillery and Engineers of Turin in 1930–31. In 1935, after promotion to lieutenant colonel he participated in the Second Italo-Ethiopian War, where he directed the construction of bridges and roads. Upon his return to Italy in 1938, he was given command of the Railway Troops Regiment. In July 1942 he was promoted to brigadier general and assigned to the General Staff in Rome with the post of inspector of the mobilized railway units.

After the armistice of Cassibile and the German occupation of Italy, Perotti joined the Resistance in the ranks of the 1st Piedmontese Regional Military Committee (CMRP), where due to his skills he was appointed by the National Liberation Committee (CLN) as coordinator of the Piedmontese CLN; in the following months he carried out sabotage actions on Axis-controlled railways and laid the groundwork of the organization and guerrilla tactics of the Piedmontese Resistance. On 31 March 1944 he was captured by members of the Republican Police in the sacristy of the Turin Cathedral, together with his companions (including Socialist representatives Quinto Bevilacqua and Enrico Giachino, Communist representative Eusebio Giambone, Action Party representative Paolo Braccini, and former Army captains Franco Balbis and Giulio Biglieri), during a clandestine meeting of the CMRP. Between 2 and 3 April 1944 he was tried and sentenced to death by the Special Tribunal for the Defense of the State, and on 5 April 1944 he was executed by firing squad by soldiers of the Republican National Guard at the National Martinetto Polygon of Turin, together with Balbis, Braccini, Bevilacqua, Biglieri, Giachino, Giambone, and lieutenant Massimo Montano, another member of the CMRP who had been arrested earlier. Before the squad fired he said to his companions: "Officers, gentlemen, stand at attention: Long live Italy!" He was posthumously awarded the Gold Medal of Military Valor.
