= Enciclopedia Giuridica Italiana =

Encyclopedia from Italy

The Enciclopedia Giuridica Italiana ("Encyclopedia of Italian Law") was a specialized encyclopedia that comprehensively described the Italian legal system at the time of its publication. It was published from 1884 to 1932 by the Società Editrice Libraria based in Milan and later reprinted. It comprised 43 volumes. Leading Italian lawyers of the time were involved in compiling the work, including the former Minister of Justice and Foreign Affairs Pasquale Stanislao Mancini at the end of the 19th century. The publication of the Enciclopedia Giuridica Italiana contributed to the establishment of a uniform and modern legal system in the Italian nation state, which was created in 1870 with the completion of the Risorgimento.
